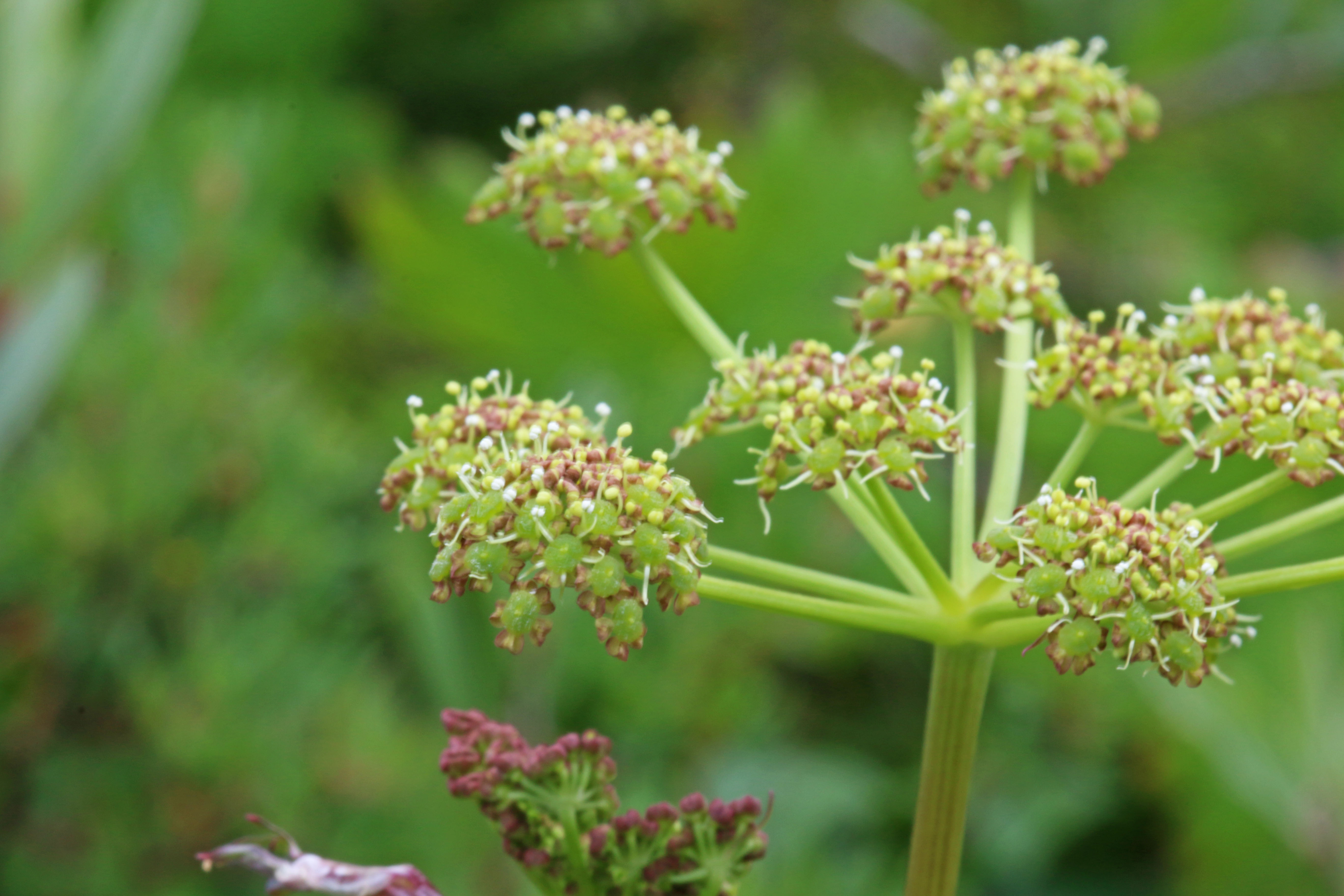

Conservation status
- Imperiled (NatureServe)

Scientific classification
- Kingdom: Plantae
- Clade: Tracheophytes
- Clade: Angiosperms
- Clade: Eudicots
- Clade: Asterids
- Order: Apiales
- Family: Apiaceae
- Genus: Angelica
- Species: A. wheeleri

Binomial name
- Angelica wheeleri S.Watson (1873)

= Angelica wheeleri =

Species of flowering plant

Angelica wheeleri is a rare species of Angelica, a perennial herb in the Apiaceae (carrot) family, endemic to the state of Utah in the United States. The common names for A. wheeleri are Utah angelica or Wheeler's angelica. A. wheeleri was named by Sereno Watson in 1873.

Angelica wheeleri can grow to 2 meters (6.5 feet) or taller, a distinguishing feature along with its primary opposite leaves. It has a hollow stem and white umbel flowers that bloom between June and August. These flowers produce small, dense, and hairy green fruits. These seeds are lime green and appear similar in shape to a watermelon, consistently around five millimeters long. A. wheeleri grows in wet riparian areas, or seeps and springs.

Angelica wheeleri is rare, and has only been found in as few as 11 locations across 6 counties in Utah (Cache, Salt Lake, Utah, Juab, Sevier, and Piute). It is found in elevations between 1524 and 3050 meters. As a wetland plant native to a desert climate, A. wheeleri is at risk from rising temperatures and longer summers, urban development, stream channelization, water diversions, and other watershed and stream alterations, recreation, and invasive exotic plants. A. wheeleri was also found in the scat of black bears in the Hobble Creek area, a sign on natural herbivory that may also present risk to this plant.
