= Recreation ecology =

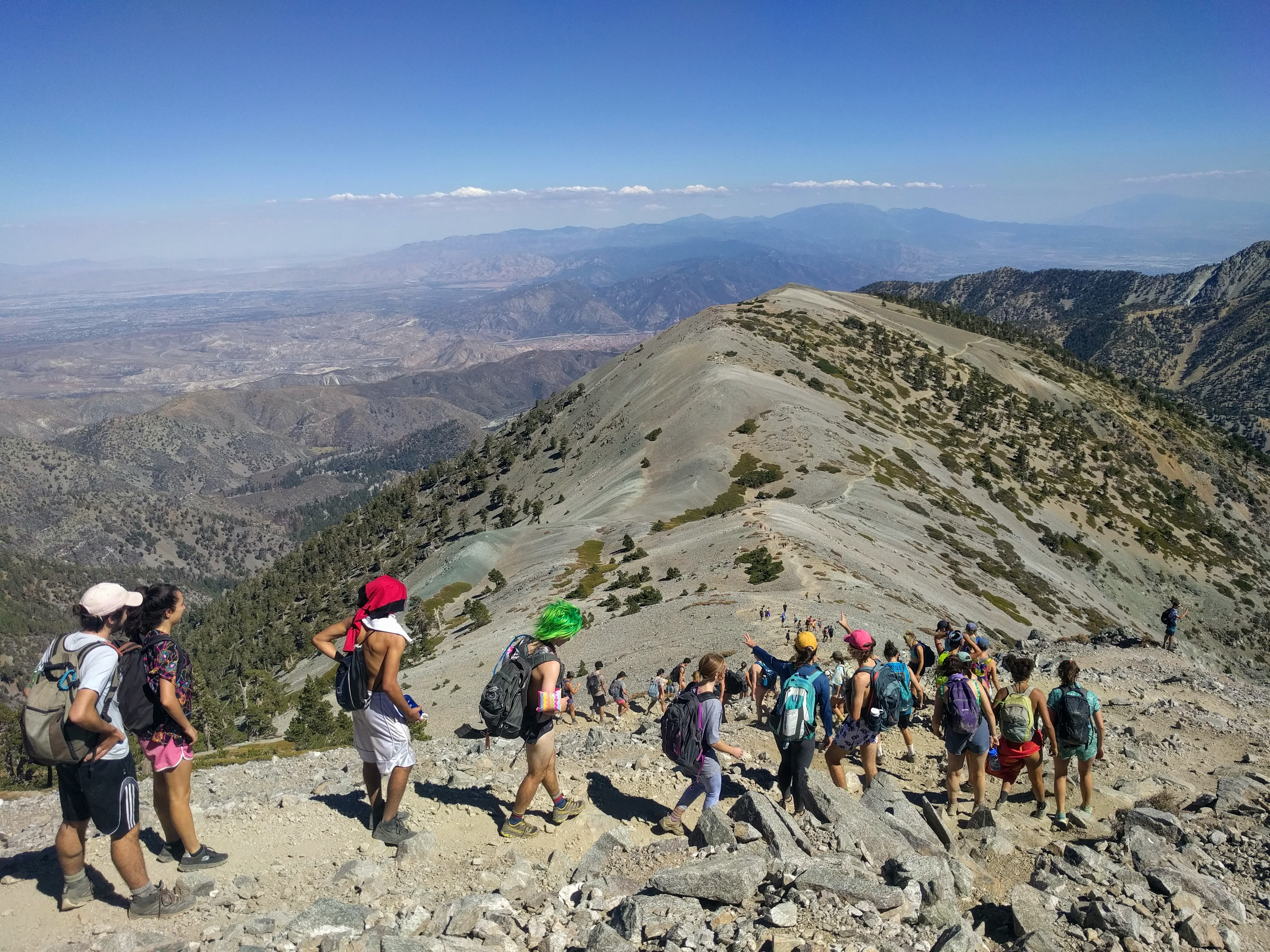

Recreation ecology is the scientific study of environmental impacts resulting from recreational activity in protected natural areas. This field of study includes research and monitoring assessments of biophysical changes, analyses to identify causal and influential factors or support carrying capacity planning and management, and investigations of the efficacy of educational, regulatory, and site management actions designed to minimize recreation impacts. These ecological understandings of environmental impacts of outdoor recreation is critical to the management of recreation, ecotourism and visitation to natural spaces. Recreation ecology research has looked at the ecological impacts of hiking, camping and other outdoor recreation activities where the use and visitation is concentrated. As outdoor recreation shows increasing participation globally, questions and concerns are raised to which these can be managed sustainably with minimal impact to the environment.

== History ==
While scientific studies of human trampling can be traced back to the late 1920s, a substantial body of recreation ecology literature did not accumulate until the 1970s when visitation to the outdoors soared, threatening the ecology of natural and semi-natural areas. Since the 1970s and 1980s, this discipline has slowly accumulated momentum, adding new disciplinarians each year. Most of this field's work comes from Europe, although North American studies are quickly growing. Some prominent United States undergraduate and graduate programs include Oregon State University, Utah State University, the University of Illinois-Urbana Champaign, and Fort Lewis College, situated in Colorado. Other universities have begun developing programs, too, with hopes of sustainably transforming the way people interact with their natural and recreational resources. The Global South has received far less attention, although notably, Rwandan communities invested in sustainable modes of recreation and tourism relating to mountain gorilla habitat quality have considered the suite of environmental effects.

Recreation ecology as a field of study more officially began in the early 1960s and was addressed in depth by J. Alan Wagar in his work titled The Carrying Capacity of Wild Lands For Recreation, published in 1964 in the Society of American Foresters. In this publication, Wagar poses the question: do wild lands have carrying capacities for recreation use? Wagar addresses this question in terms of: (1) the impacts of outdoor recreation on people (2) the impacts of people in these outdoor spaces and (3) management procedures to address issues of overcrowding in wild lands for recreation.

In the past few decades, more than 1000 articles on recreation ecology have been published. As it is projected that the amount of time spent and the number of participants in winter, water-based and developed land activities will grow faster than the population, there is a growing importance and need for recreation ecology.

== Research ==
Resource elements examined include soil, vegetation, water, and more recently, wildlife and microbes, with the majority of investigations conducted on trails, recreation sites, and campsites. Use-impact relationships, environmental resistance and resilience, management effectiveness, monitoring techniques, and carrying capacity are some of the major themes in recreation ecology. The impact of trampling from foot, bike, horse, or any other means of traffic in natural spaces is the most common and systematically researched topic in the field of recreation ecology. Additional ecological impacts often studied in the field of recreation ecology include:

- herbaceous plant cover
- vegetation and tree disturbance
- trampling of vegetation
- disturbances to aquatic systems
- disturbances to wildlife
- soil loss

=== Trampling of vegetation ===
The impact of trampling from foot, bike, horse, or any other means of traffic in natural spaces is the most common and systematically researched topic in the field of recreation ecology. Trampling of vegetation is studied often in terms of soil loss, plant loss, and erosion. Longer-term studies reveal how chronic trampling disturbances engage successional processes, ultimately engaging plant community shifts.

=== Aquatic Systems ===
Many recreational activities on aquatic systems have been examined such as power boating, water skiing, in-stream walking, and swimming. Even more pronounced than boating, skiing, walking, and swimming effects include the impacts of angling on ponds, lakes, and streams. Fishing pressures occurring on recreational-sized scales can exert an important influence on the population sizes, community interactions, and behavioral variation associated with fish and non-fish aquatic organisms. Scholars also take to brackish and marine ecosystems, like estuaries and coral reefs to assess how SCUBA diving, snorkeling, surfing, and boating influence local ecosystem qualities. An important case stems from the Olympic Coast National Marine Sanctuary, located off the Pacific Washington (US) coast, which uncovers how consistent marine fishing limits the growth and development of many nekton species. Ultimately, recreational overfishing called for markedly stronger regulations.

These activities can cause physical disturbances to aquatic habitats through sound and movement, as well as subject these systems to an influx of nutrients, introduction of pathogens, and sedimentation. Although this section barely scratches the surface, water-based recreation throughout marine and freshwater systems effectively diffuses or spreads non-native and often invasive species into new water bodies. This impact often leads to insidious events, which might not outwardly manifest for years, although when it does, many system components will have likely been severely damaged.

=== Wildlife Disturbances ===
Outdoor recreation has many impacts on wildlife such as wildlife disturbances and habitat destruction. Hiking and camping may affect wildlife habitats through trampling and destruction of wildlife habitats. Additionally hiking and camping can result in noise disturbances for wildlife, as well as produce negative impacts through discarded food and trash. Poor trash management in protected natural areas with high levels of tourism can cause large rubbish piles, leading to wildlife habituation. When wildlife species become dependent on trash, they remain close to humans, raising concerns on the matter of human-animal conflicts.

== Applications and Management ==
Studying the intensity and extent of these factors can measure the intensity of impacts of outdoor recreation on the environment including the amount of use, type and behavior of use, timing of use, and type and condition of the environment.

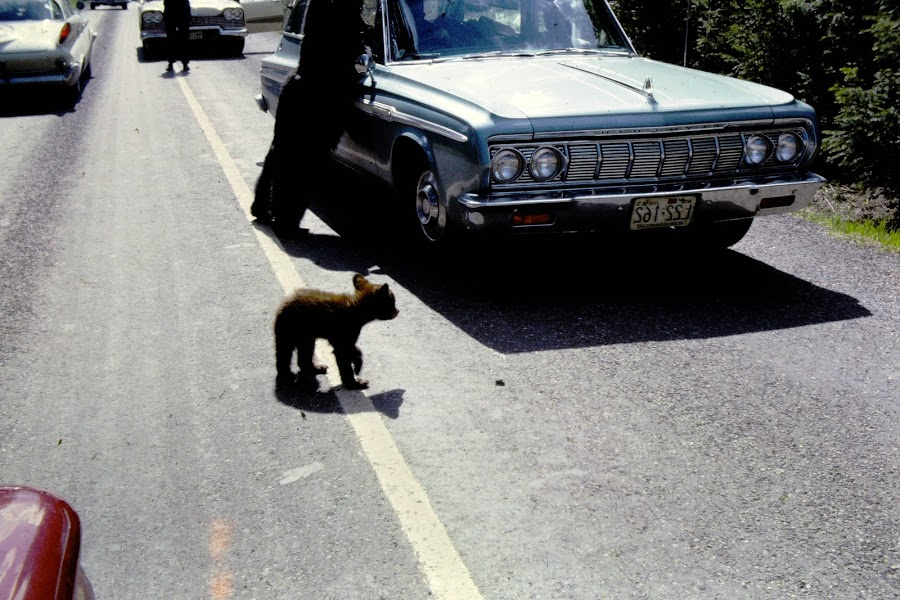

Study results have been applied to inform site and visitor management decisions and to provide scientific input to management planning frameworks such as:

- Limits of Acceptable Change (LAC)
- Visitor Experience and Resource Protection (VERP)
- Biophysical carrying capacity
- Designation of protected areas

Recreation Ecology Research publications have been disproportionately focused on North American field sites, and global publications are dominated by Anglophone authors, resulting in these publications being limited to English scientific journals. Second and third to North America, Europe and Australia have received attention and have had studies conducted on recreation ecology.

== Ecotourism ==
Recent growth of ecotourism has prompted a new batch of recreation ecology studies focusing on developing countries where ecotourism is aggressively promoted. There is an increasing concern that ecotourism is not inherently sustainable and, if unchecked, would generate substantial impacts to ecotourism destinations which are often fragile ecosystems.

Recreation ecology and ecotourism are connected through the Tourism carrying capacity and Biophysical carrying capacity. Understanding the dynamics of nature and the resiliency of an ecosystem can allow for the estimated maximum number of visitors can come to a natural space before starting to see negative impacts.
