= Impacts of tourism =

Effects of tourism on the environment. destination communities, and economy

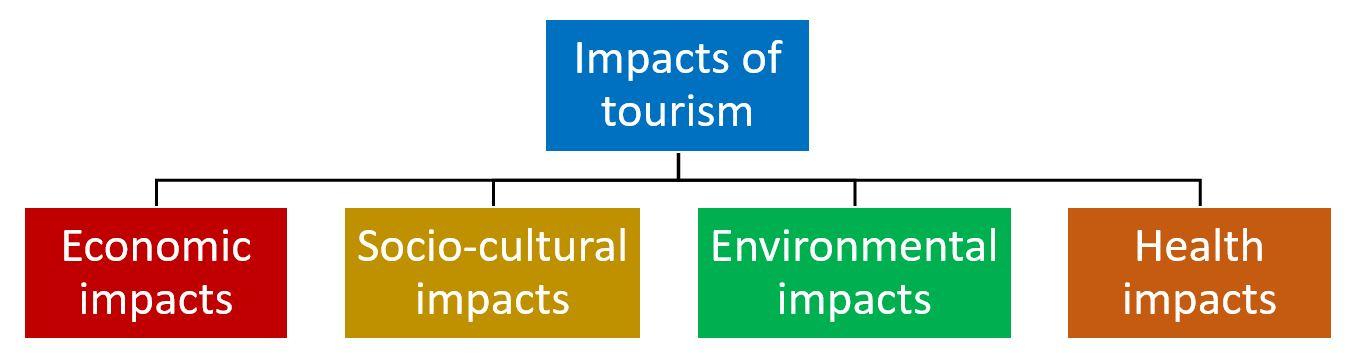
Impacts of tourism

Tourism has a significant impact on destinations, influencing their economy, culture, environment, and communities. Tourism positively affects many parties in society but can also be detrimental in certain situations.

In general, tourism positively affects the economy of its destination. The purchasing of commodities, and the usage of hotels and transport by tourists all contribute to economic activity within the country.

The sociocultural impacts of tourism are less straightforward, bringing both benefits and challenges to the destination. The interactions between tourists and locals foster a cultural exchange, particularly exposing tourists to a different culture through direct interactions and overall immersion. However, differing expectations in the societal and moral values of the tourists and those from the host location can cause friction between the two parties.

While tourism may have positive impacts environmentally, through an increase in awareness of certain environmental issues, tourism overall negatively impacts the environment. Tourist destinations and attractions located in the wild may neglect environmental concerns to satisfy the demands of tourists, creating issues such as pollution and deforestation.

Tourism also has positive and negative health outcomes for local people. The short-term negative impacts of tourism on residents' health are related to the density of tourist arrivals, the risk of disease transmission, road accidents, higher crime levels, as well as traffic congestion, crowding, and other stressful factors. In addition, residents can experience anxiety and depression related to their risk perceptions about mortality rates, food insecurity, contact with infected tourists, etc. At the same time, there are positive long-term impacts of tourism on residents' health and well-being outcomes through improving healthcare access, positive emotions, novelty, and social interactions.

== Economic impacts ==
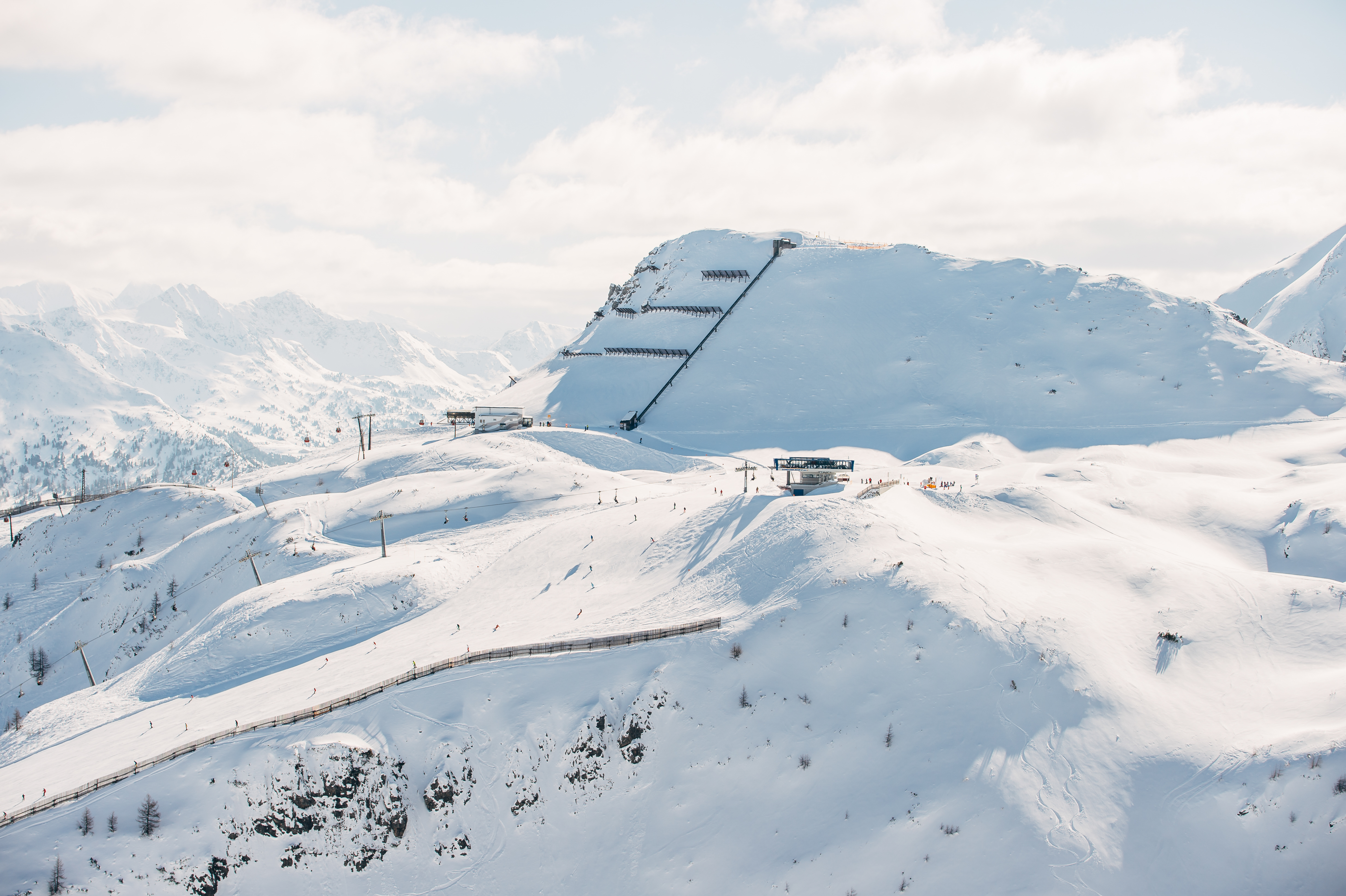
Gondola lift in Zauchensee, ski resort Austria

About 1.5 billion international tourists were recorded worldwide in 2024, with international tourism receipts reaching US$1.7 trillion. Europe accounted for US$725 billion, or 42% of global international tourism receipts.

Tourism can be divided into subcategories into which impacts fall: spending from visitors on tourism experiences, like beach holidays and theme parks (domestic and international), business spending, and capital investment.

The economic impact of tourism is experienced through indirect and direct means. Direct economic effects are experienced when travelers buy items like accommodation, entertainment, food and drinks, and retail items within or close to a tourism destination, with residents', visitors', businesses', and governments' spending causing such effects. The key component of direct economic impacts of tourism is that they occur within a country's borders and are implemented by "residents and non-residents for business and leisure purposes".

In contrast, indirect economic impacts of tourism can be found in investment spending surrounding a tourism offering from private and governmental interests. This investment may not explicitly be related to tourism, but benefits the tourist and local stakeholders all the same. The indirect effects of tourism are seen in the heightened demand for intermediate goods and services. Restaurants, for example, would buy more supplies to meet the boom in tourists in peak season. Further, local infrastructure improvements, like the widening of sidewalks in busy city centers, also illustrate the indirect effects of tourism. The ripple effects trigger economic activity outside the tourism industry itself, benefiting numerous industries and stakeholders. Indirect economic impacts (the supply chain, investment, and government collective) account for 50.7 percent of the total GDP contribution from travel and tourism in 2014.

Induced spending, which is the re-circulation of a tourist dollar within a community, is another way that tourism indirectly has an impact on a community. For example, a foreign tourist injects money into the local economy when he spends a dollar on a souvenir made by a local at the tourism destination. That individual goes on to spend that dollar on lunch from a local vendor, and that vendor goes on to spend it locally.

=== Positive and negative economic impacts of tourism ===
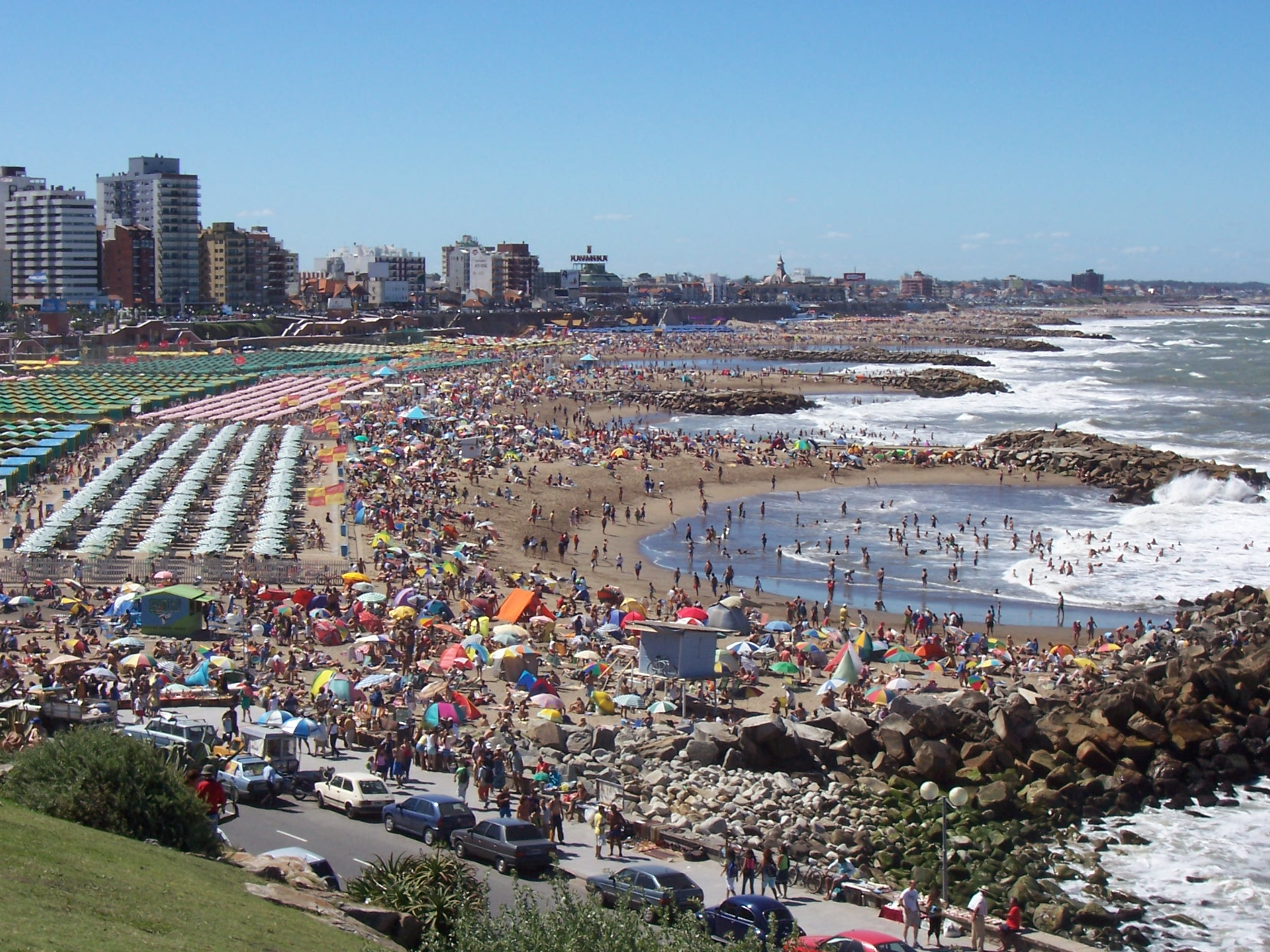
Crowded beach in Mar del Plata during summer

Tourism can economically impact the local people positively or negatively.

Positive impacts on residents and destination, as well as tourists themselves

- More jobs available (positive for residents)
- Higher quality of life (positive for residents)
- Increased income and wealth (positive for residents)
- Rebuilding and restoring historic sites and encouraging the revitalization of cultures. (positive for destination)
- Heritage tourism focuses on local history or historical events that occurred in the area, and tends to promote education. (positive for destination as well as tourists)
- The local economy is stimulated and diversified, goods are manufactured more locally, and new markets open for local business owners to expand to. (positive for residents)

Negative impacts

- The benefits are not universal nor guaranteed. While more employment may be available, tourism-related jobs are often seasonal and low-paying. Prices can fluctuate throughout the year. They rise in the high tourist season to take advantage of more tourist dollars, but have the side effect of pricing goods above the economic reach of local residents, effectively starving them out their homes. (negative for residents)
- Damage to social and cultural area, as well as the natural environment. (negative for destination as well as residents)
- As the population increases, so do the impacts: resources become unsustainable and exhausted, the carrying capacity for tourists at a destination site may be depleted. (negative for tourists as well as residents)
- Often, when negative impacts occur, it is too late to impose restrictions and regulations. Tourist destinations seem to discover that many of the negative impacts are found in the development stage of the tourism area life cycle (TALC). (negative for destination and tourists)
- The economics of tourism have been shown to push out local tourism business owners in favour of strangers to the region. Foreign ownership creates leakage (revenues leaving the host community for another nation or multinational business) which strips away the opportunity for locals to make meaningful profits. Foreign companies are also known to hire non-resident seasonal workers because they can pay them less; this further contributes to economic leakage. Tourism can raise property values near the tourism area, effectively pushing out locals and encouraging businesses to migrate inwards to encourage and take advantage of more tourist spending, Moreover, over-tourism might endanger other businesses. (negative for residents)

=== Employment ===
Employment, and both its availability and exclusivity, are subsets of economic impacts of tourism. Travel and tourism create 10.7 percent of the total available jobs worldwide, in both the direct and indirect tourism sectors. Direct tourism jobs, those that provide the visitor with their tourism experience include, but are not limited to: accommodation (building, cleaning, managing), food and drink services, entertainment, manufacturing, and shopping Indirect jobs related to tourism include the manufacturing of aircraft, boats, and other transportation. Employment may also be generated in construction, because additional superstructures and infrastructure is needed to accommodate tourists. Airports and ports generate seasonal employment opportunities for locals.

=== Tourism satellite account (TSA) ===
The World Travel and Tourism Council (WTTC) Tourism Satellite Account (TSA) is a system of measurement recognized by the United Nations to define the extent of an economic sector that is not so easily defined as industries like forestry or oil and gas Tourism does not fit neatly into a statistical model; because it is not so much dependent on the physical movement of products and services, as it is on the position of the consumer. Therefore, TSAs were designed to standardize these many offerings for an international scale to facilitate better understanding of current tourism circumstances locally and abroad. The standardization includes concepts, classifications, and definitions, and is meant to enable researchers, industry professionals, and the average tourism business owner to view international comparisons.

Before TSAs were widely implemented, a gap existed in the available knowledge about tourism as an economic driver for GDP, employment, investment, and industry consumption; indicators were primarily approximations and therefore lacking in scientific and analytical viewpoints. This gap meant missed opportunities for development, as tourism stakeholders were unable to understand where they might be able to better establish themselves in the tourism economy. For example, a TSA can measure tax revenues related to tourism, which is a key contributor to the level of enthusiasm any level of government might have towards potential tourism investment. In 2006 Tyrrell and Johnston published The Economic Impacts of Tourism: A Special Issue and claimed that stakeholders in tourism benefit from the TSA because it has a good and bad impact on animals classification employment

- provides credible data on the impact of tourism and the associated employment
- is a framework for organizing statistical data on tourism
- is an international standard endorsed by the UN Statistical Commission
- is an instrument for designing economic policies related to tourism development
- provides data on tourism's impact on a nation's balance of payments
- provides information on tourism human resource characteristics

Through collection of more qualitative data and translating it into a more concise and effective form for tourism providers, TSAs are able to fill the previous knowledge gap. Information delivered and measured by a TSA includes tax revenues, economic impact on national balances, human resources, employment, and "tourism's contribution to gross domestic product".

== Sociocultural impacts ==
=== Commodification of culture ===
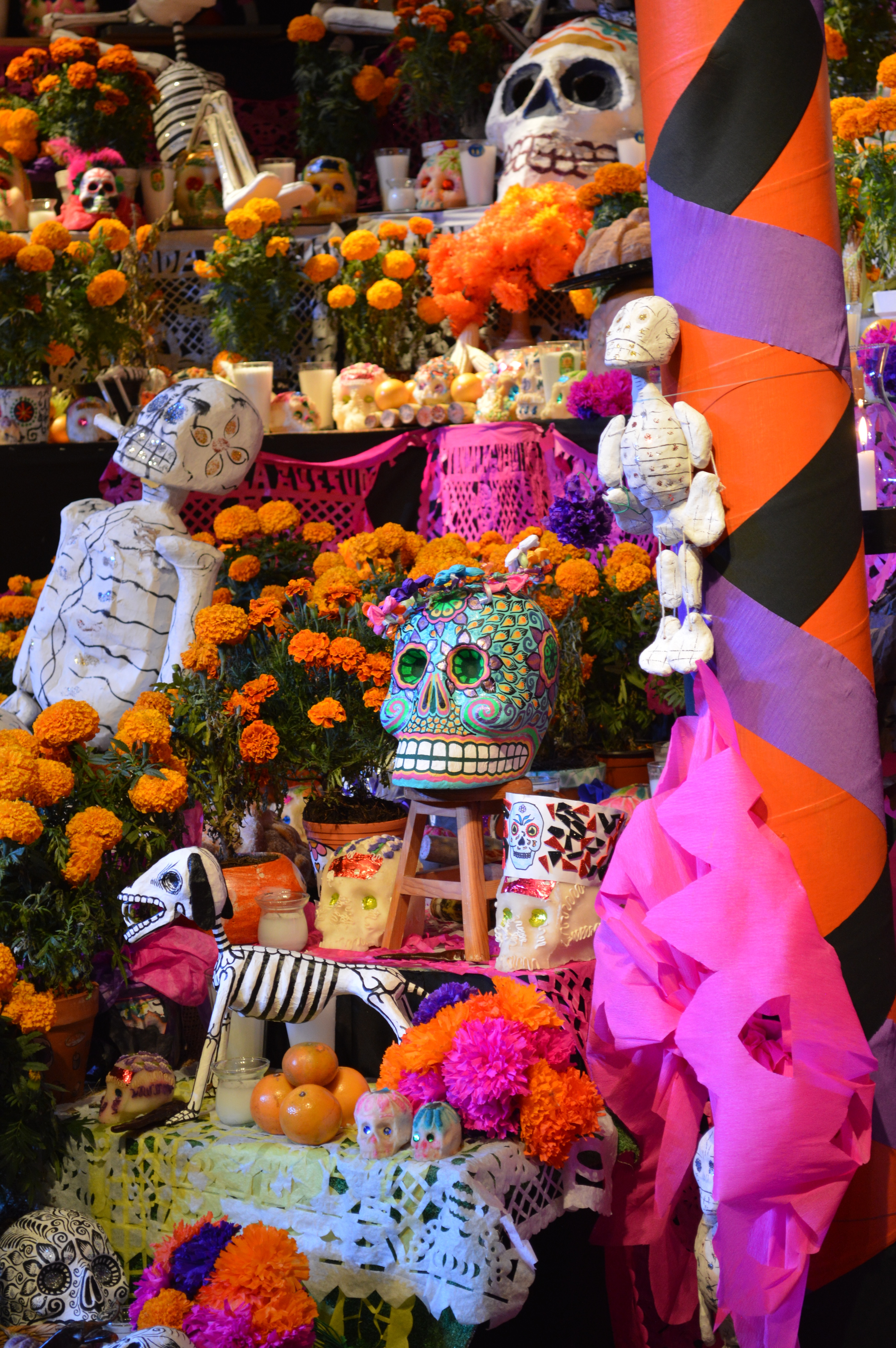
Day of the Dead, Tourism in Mexico

Commodification of culture refers to the use of a cultural traditions and artifacts in order to sell and profit for the local economy. With the rise of tourism, authors argue that commodification is inevitable. There are both positive and negative sociocultural impacts of commodification on a culture. One positive is the creation of business and jobs for local craftsmen, who are able to sell their goods to tourists. Rural tourism is seen as a "cure" for poverty and leads to the improvement of transportation and development of telecommunications in an area. For the tourist, commodification creates an interest for traditional arts and social practices.

On the other hand, some researchers argue that contact with the secular West leads to the destruction of pre-tourist cultures. In addition, the "development cure", the idea that increasing tourism will spur economic change while strengthening local culture, is claimed to lead to various social problems, such as drug abuse, crime, pollution, prostitution, social instability, and growth of capitalist values and a consumer culture.

=== Demonstration effect ===
The demonstration effect was introduced to tourism when the researchers were looking into the effects of social influences from tourism on local communities. The demonstration effect argues that local inhabitants copy the behavioral patterns of tourists. There are a number of social, economic and behavioral reasons as to why the demonstration effect comes into play. One economic and social reason is that locals copy the consumption patterns of those higher up the social scale in order to improve their social status.

There are many criticisms of the demonstration effect in tourism. First, tourism is seen as only one aspect of change in society. Local people also see examples of foreign lifestyles and consumption in advertising, magazines, television, and films, and therefore tourism is not the only influence on local culture. In addition, the demonstration effect implies that a culture is weak and needs to be protected by outside influences. In many cases, the demonstrative effect is seen as a negative consequence, but it is argued that "all cultures are in a continual process of change", therefore tourism should not be considered destructive.

=== Community participation ===
Community participation refers to the collaboration between community members for the purposes of achieving common goals, improving their local community and pursuing individual benefits. Local community members are actively involved in tourism, rather than passively benefiting from it. Community participation strengthens communities and help to create a sense of belonging, trust and credibility among members. By involving local community members, tourism can become more authentic. The community and the tourists both benefit from community participation, as it boosts their respect for the traditional lifestyle and values of the destination community. Most destination community members are also the ones most impacted by tourism, therefore there is an importance in their involvement in tourism planning. Some researchers will argue that some of the negative impacts of tourism might be avoided and the positive impacts... maximized through community participation in the planning process.

=== Acculturation ===
Acculturation is the process of modifying an existing culture through borrowing from the more dominant cultures. Typically in tourism the local community is being acculturated as destination community. The local community will experiences dramatic shifts in social structure and world view. Societies adapt to acculturation in one of two ways. Diffusion of innovations occurs when the local community adopts practices that were developed by another group. Cultural adaptation is less adoption of a new culture and more the process of changing when the existing culture is superseded.

Acculturation is often seen by tourists as a method of modernizing a community. One argument against modernization is that it contributes to the "homogenization of cultural differences and the decline of traditional societies".

=== Positive socio-cultural impacts ===
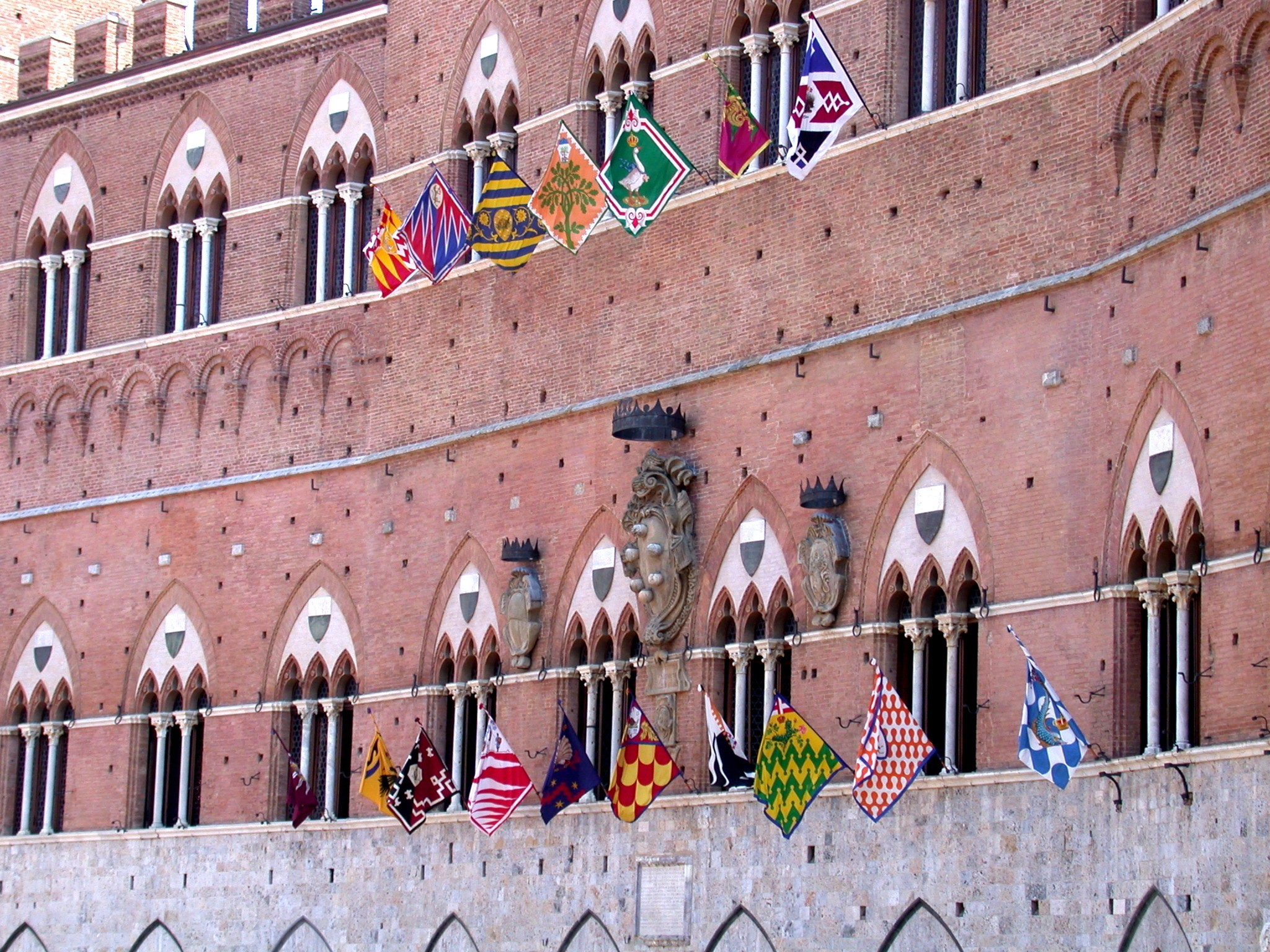
Façade of the Palazzo Pubblico in Siena during the Palio days

There are number of benefits for the host community as a result of tourism. This includes economic benefits such as opportunities for local businesses which allows for increased trade among the increased number of visitors and then develops a variety of local businesses. In addition, tourism also brings employment opportunities, enhances the economy of the region, and creates revenue for the local government. Tourists also use public services, creating funding for public services, such as health, the police and the fire department, as well as increasing the demand for public transport. Other public facilities, such as parks and benches are also well kept by the community for the tourists, improving the overall aesthetics of the host community. On a more social level, tourism leads to intercultural interaction. Tourists often engage and learn from the locals. Tourism can also increase pride in locals who want to show off their community that they have chosen to visit. The increase in people also leads to creating more social venues and experiences where locals and tourists can interact in. Entertainment and recreational facilities will allow for more opportunity to socialize and engage with each other.

Tourism can be beneficial for the host community as it provides the financial means and the incentive to preserve cultural histories, local heritage sites, and customs. It stimulates interest in local crafts, traditional activities, songs, dance, and oral histories. It also opens up the community to the wider world, new ideas, new experiences, and new ways of thinking.

=== Negative socio-cultural impacts ===
Cultural interactions can have negative effects. In terms of economic disadvantages, local communities need to be able to fund the tourist demands, which leads to an increase of taxes. The overall price of living increases in tourist destinations in terms of rent and rates, as well as property values going up. This can be problematic for locals looking to buy property or others on a fixed income.

Other negative sociocultural impacts are differences in social and moral values among the local host community and the visiting tourist. Outside of affecting the relationship between tourist and local, it can also cause friction between groups of the local population. In addition, it can cause drifts in the dynamics between the old and new generations. Tourism has also correlated to the rise of delinquent behaviors in local host communities. Crime rates have been seen to rise with the increase of tourists. Crimes are typically those of rowdy behavior, alcohol and illegal drug use, and loud noise. In addition, gambling and prostitution may increase due to tourists looking for a "good time". Tourism has also caused more disruption in host communities. Crowding of locals and tourists may create a vibrant ambiance, it also causes frustration and leads to the withdrawal of local residents in many places. Increased tourists also results in increased traffic which can hinder daily life of the local residents. Culture shock may impact both tourists and their hosts.

==== Contraband ====
Tourism is associated with the export of contraband such as endangered species or certain cultural artifacts.

==== Tourism fatigue and anti-tourism sentiment ====
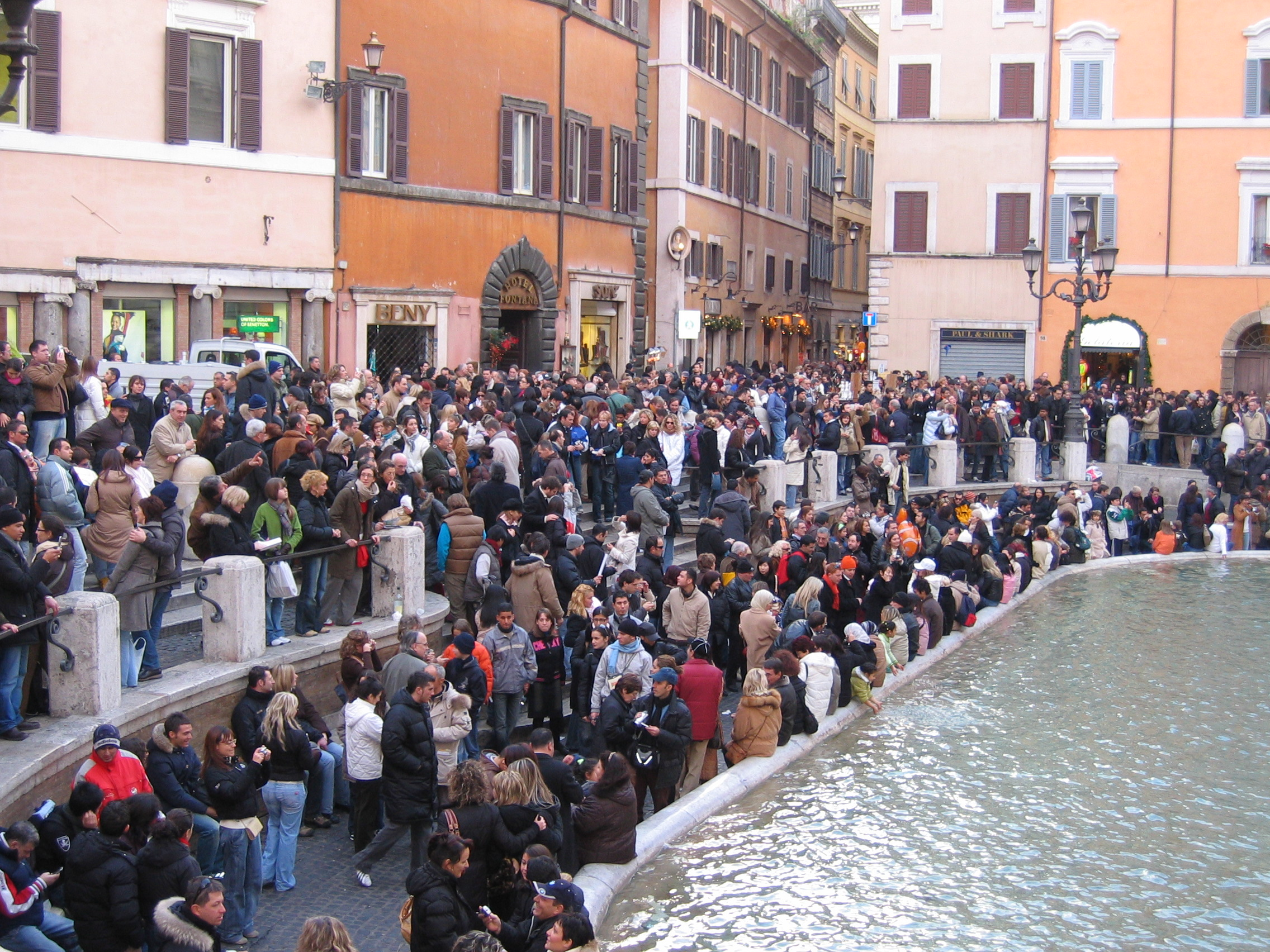
Overtourism at the Trevi Fountain in Rome

Excessive hordes of visitors (or of the wrong sort of visitors) can provoke backlashes from otherwise friendly hosts in popular destinations.

The local population in many areas has developed anti-tourism sentiment and begun to protest against tourists. One of the most prominent examples of such a mobilization was the so-called "Tourists go home" movement, which emerged in 2014 in Spain due to slogans and mottos calling on tourists to go back to their homes. Venice also faced such problems, and the "Tourists go home" slogans appeared on the walls of the city. Moreover, several other countries, such as Japan and the Philippines, are having problems with overtourism.

The year 2017 seems to be a landmark for anti-tourism sentiment as "a new Spanish social movement against an economic development model based on mass tourism gained following high-profile attacks targeting foreign tourists and local business interests." Anti-tourism sentiment also seems to be linked to a clash of identity and people's individualism.

=== Tourism and protection of cultural property ===
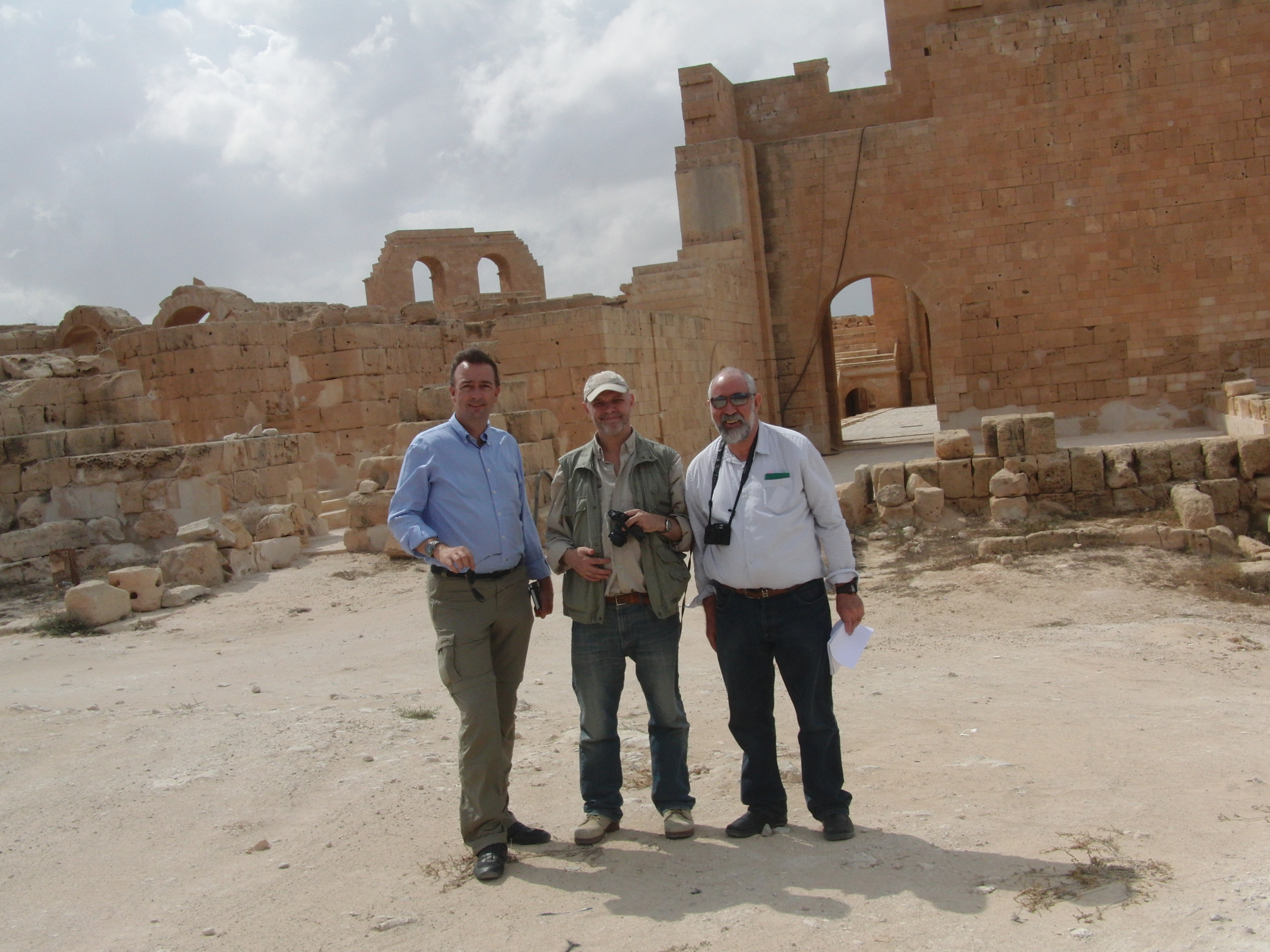
An action by Blue Shield International for the protection of tourist cultural property in Libya during the war in 2011

Tourism and the protection of cultural property are two subject areas that often complement each other but sometimes also face one another. In the case of cultural tourism, gentle tourism, and adventure tourism, there are numerous points of contact between the marketing, mediation, and preservation of cultural assets. Sensible use is usually the most effective protection of valuable assets. If cultural assets bring the population an economic advantage, they are also interested in their preservation.

The increase in tourism can be a blessing and a curse at the same time, because social media and other new advertising channels often attract so many tourists to one place that it can lead to "overkill." World Heritage Sites are therefore increasingly resorting to visitor restrictions to be able to contain the flood of tourists. Conversely, tourism also has the effect that certain cultural assets become known, and, in the event of war, parties to the conflict want to prevent their destruction with regard to international opinion.

With regard to the protection of cultural assets in the event of armed conflict, there are numerous initiatives on this topic from the UN, UNESCO and Blue Shield International. This also applies to World Heritage Sites. But only through cooperation with the locals can the protection of tourist cultural sites, world heritage sites, archaeological finds, exhibits, and archaeological sites from destruction, looting, and robbery be implemented in a sustainable manner. Simply agreeing to international contracts and contacting state authorities is not enough. In the event of war, it is particularly important to monitor and implement protection directly on-site, because such protection is the only way to ensure the future use of tourist goods for the population. The founding president of Blue Shield International, Karl von Habsburg, aptly summed it up with the words, "Without the local community and without the local participants, this would be completely impossible."

== Environmental impacts ==
Ecotourism, nature tourism, wildlife tourism, and adventure tourism take place in environments such as rain forests, high alpine, wilderness, lakes and rivers, coastlines and marine environments, as well as rural villages and coastline resorts. Peoples' desire for more authentic and challenging experiences results in their destinations becoming more remote, to the few remaining pristine and natural environments left on the planet. The positive impact of this can be an increased awareness of environmental stewardship. The negative impact can be a destruction of the very experience that people are seeking. There are direct and indirect impacts, immediate and long-term impacts, and there are impacts that are both proximal and distal to the tourist destination. These impacts can be separated into three categories: facility impacts, tourist activities, and the transit effect.

Environmental sustainability focuses on the overall viability and health of ecological systems. Natural resource degradation, pollution, and loss of biodiversity are detrimental because they increase vulnerability, undermine system health, and reduce resilience. More research is needed to assess the impacts of tourism on natural capital and ecosystem services. Interdisciplinary and transdisciplinary research is needed to address how the tourism industry impacts waste and wastewater treatment, pollination, food security, raw materials, genetic resources, oil and natural gas regulation and ecosystem functions such as soil retention and nutrient recycling.

Negative environmental consequences related to tourism activities, such as greenhouse gas emissions from air travel, and litter at popular locations, can be significant. The tourism sector accounts for about 5% of global CO_{2} emissions with aviation contributing to 40% of CO_{2} emissions related to tourist transportation.

=== Facility impacts ===
Facility impacts occur when a regional area evolves from "exploration" to "involvement" and then into the "development" stage of the tourist area life cycle. During latter phase, there can be both direct and indirect environmental impacts through the construction of superstructures such as hotels, restaurants, and shops, and infrastructures such as roads and power supply. As the destination develops, more tourists seek the experience. Their impacts increase accordingly. The requirement for water for washing, waste disposal, and drinking increases. Tourist demands have the potential to alter, excessively extract, and pollute rivers. Noise pollution has the capacity to disturb wildlife and alter behavior, and light pollution can disrupt the feeding and reproductive behavior of many creatures. When power is supplied by diesel or gasoline generators, there is additional noise and pollution. General waste and garbage are also a result of the facilities. As more tourists arrive, there is an increase in food and beverages consumed, which in turn creates waste plastic and non-biodegradable products.

=== Coastal tourism ===
Many coastal areas are experiencing particular pressure from growing numbers of tourists and rising sea levels due to climate change. Coastal environments are limited in extent consisting of only a narrow strip along the edge of the ocean. Coastal areas are often the first environments to experience the detrimental impacts of tourism. Planning and management controls can reduce the impact on coastal environments and ensure that investment into tourism products supports sustainable coastal tourism.

=== Tourist activities ===
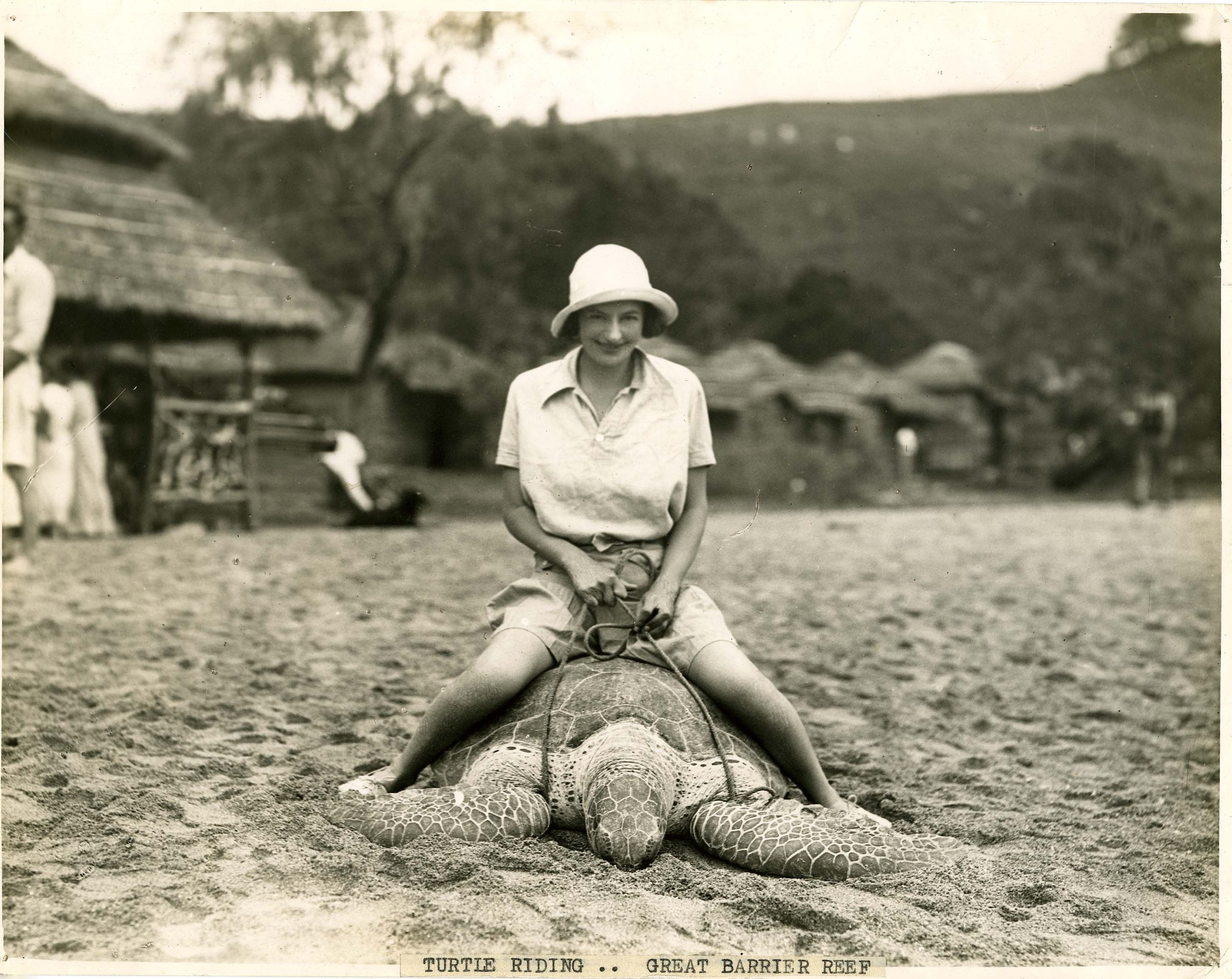
Turtle riding was a popular tourist activity in the 1920s and 1930s.

There are a range of impacts from hiking, trekking, and camping that directly affect the activity area. The most obvious is the erosion and compaction of trails through daily use. With the presence of obstacles such as fallen trees or puddles, trails becomes widened or informal trails are created to bypass the obstacle. Other direct impacts include damage or removal of vegetation, loss of vegetation height, reduction in foliage cover, exposure of tree root systems, migration of trampled vegetation, and introduction of non-native species. Indirect impacts on trails include changes in soil porosity, changes to microflora composition, problems with seed dispersion and germination, and degradation of soil nutrient composition.

As many hikers and trekkers take multi-day trips, a large number will camp overnight either in formal or random campsites. There are similar impacts on campsites, such as soil compaction, erosion and composition, loss of vegetation and foliage, and the additional issues regarding campfires. Informal trails are created around the campsite in order to collect firewood and water, and trees and saplings can be trampled, damaged, or cut-down for fuel. The heat of campfires may damage tree-root systems.

Certain invasive species, such as the zebra mussel, are spread through tourist activities, which can have a negative impact on local ecosystems. There are ways to decrease the spread of non-native species, such as taking care in removing seeds from shoes and pants after hiking or biking, thoroughly cleaning boats when moving between bodies of water, and creating designated pathway management plans.

Wildlife viewing, such as safaris in the savannas of East Africa, can lead to changes in animal behavior. The presence of humans tends to increase the stress hormones of wild animals. Additionally, baboons and hyenas have learned to track tourist safari vehicles to lead them to cheetah kills, which they then steal.

There is a small but significant number of tourists who pay considerable sums of money in order to trophy hunt lions, rhino, leopards, and even giraffes. It has been argued that there is a positive and negative, direct and indirect, environmental impact caused by trophy hunting. There is a continued discussion at national and international government level as to the ethics of funding conservation efforts through hunting activities.

Another tourism destination activity is scuba diving. There are many negative direct environmental impacts caused by recreational diving. The most apparent is the damage caused by poorly skilled divers standing on the reef itself or by accidentally hitting the fragile coral with their fins. Studies have shown that naïve divers who engage in underwater photography are considerably more likely to accidentally damage the reef. As the cost of underwater photography equipment has declined and its availability increased, it is inevitable that there will be an increase of direct damage to reefs by divers. Other direct impacts include over-fishing for "marine curios", sedimentation, and in-fill.

==== Mount Everest ====
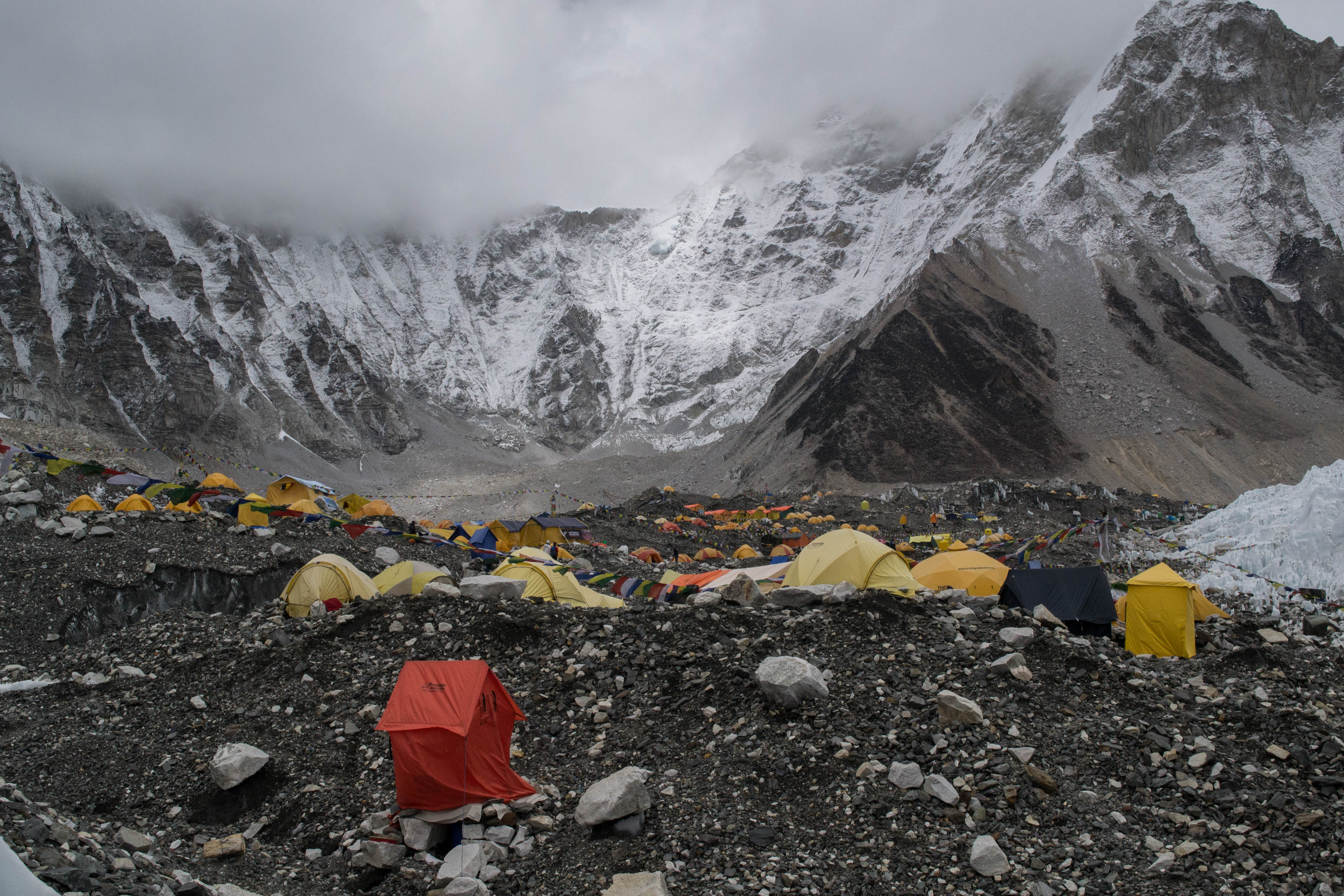
Everest Base Camp

Mount Everest attracts many tourist climbers wanting to summit the peak of the highest mountain in the world each year. Everest is a UNESCO World Heritage site. Over the years, carelessness and excessive consumption of resources by mountaineers, as well as overgrazing by livestock, have damaged the habitats of snow leopards, lesser pandas, Tibetan bears, and scores of bird species. To counteract past abuses, various reforestation programs have been carried out by local communities and the Nepalese government.

Expeditions have removed supplies and equipment left by climbers on Everest's slopes, including hundreds of oxygen containers. A large quantity of the litter of past climbers, including tons of tents, cans, crampons, and human feces, has been hauled down from the mountain and recycled or discarded. However, more than 260 climbers have died on the Mount Everest upper slopes, and their decomposing bodies have not been removed because they are unreachable or their weight makes carrying the bodies down extremely difficult. Notable in the cleanup endeavors have been the efforts of the Eco Everest Expeditions, the first of which was organized in 2008 to commemorate the death that January of Everest-climbing pioneer Edmund Hillary. Those expeditions also have publicized ecological issues, in particular concerns about the effects of climate change in the region through observations that the Khumbu Icefall is melting.

=== Effects from transportation ===
Since 2009, there has been a steady yearly increase in the number of tourist arrivals worldwide of approximately 4.4 percent. In 2015, there were 1.186 billion tourist arrivals worldwide, of which 54 percent arrived by air travel (640 million), 39 percent (462 million) by motor vehicle, 5 percent by ship transport (59 million), and 2 percent by rail travel (23.7 million). A seven-hour flight on a Boeing 747 produces 220 tons of carbon dioxide, which is the equivalent of driving an average size family saloon car for a year, or the energy requirement of an average family home for nearly 17 years.

=== Cruise ships ===
Cruises are among the fastest-growing sectors of the global travel industry. Over the past decade, cruise industry revenue grew to 37 billion U.S. dollars, and the demand for cruise travel has increased. Some argue that the profitability of mass tourism overshadows environmental and social concerns. For example, the ocean environment suffers from the dumping of wastewater and sewage, anchors damage the seabed and coral reefs, and smokestack emissions pollute the air. Social issues that have been linked to the cruise industry include poor wages and living conditions as well as discrimination and sexual harassment.

=== Small Island tourism ===
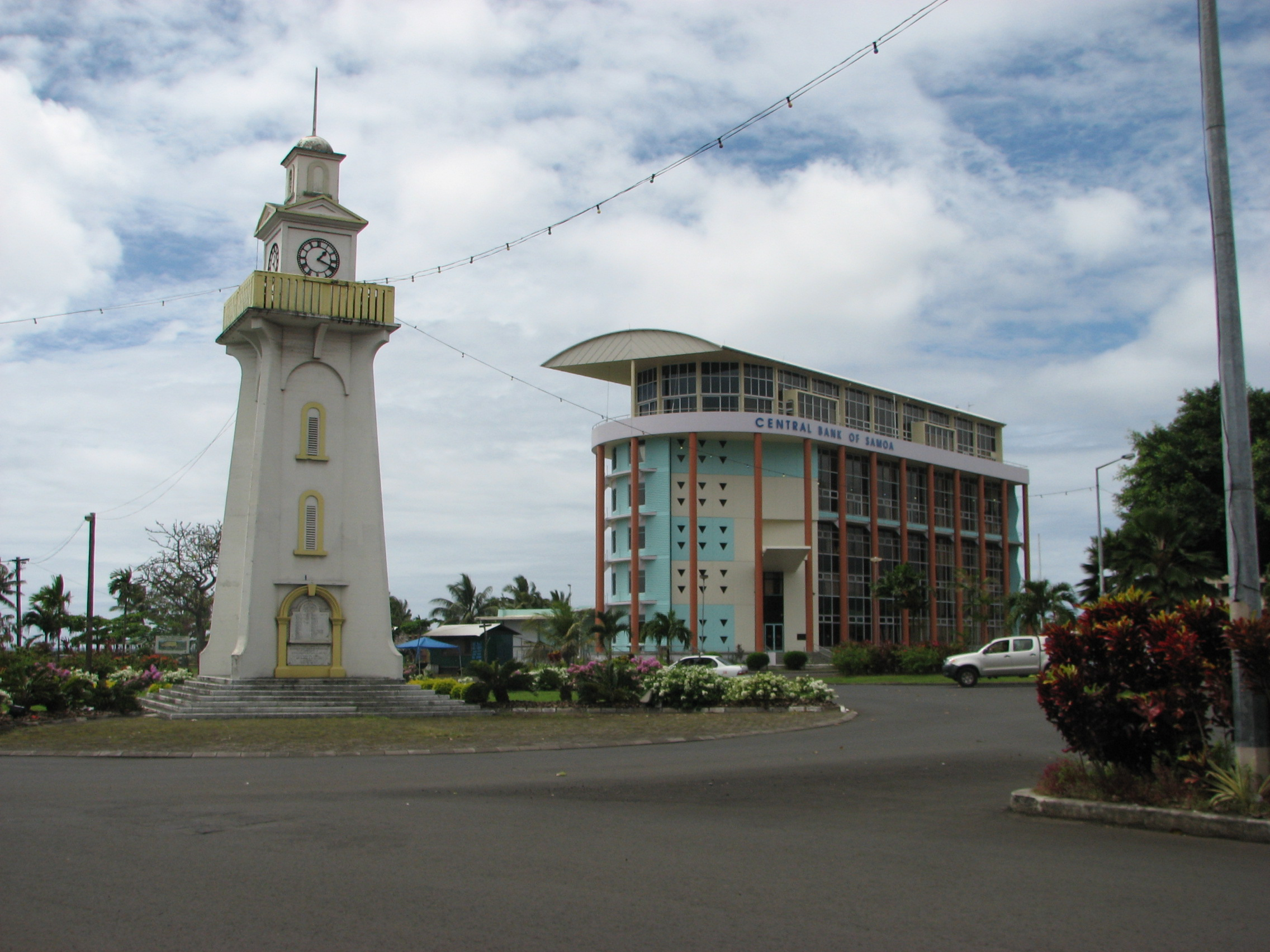
Central Bank of Samoa

Small islands often depend on tourism, as this industry makes up anywhere from 40 percent to 75 percent of the GDP (Gross Domestic Product) for various islands, including Barbados, Aruba, and Anguilla.

Mass tourism, including the cruise industry, tends to put a strain on fragile island ecosystems and the natural resources they provide. Studies have shown that early practices of tourism were unsustainable and took a toll on environmental factors, hurting the natural landscapes that originally drew in the tourists. For example, in Barbados, beaches are the main attraction and have been eroded and destroyed over the years. This is due to inefficient political decisions and policies along with irresponsible tourist activity, such as reckless driving and waste disposal, damaging coastal and marine environments. Such practices also altered physical features of the landscape and caused a loss in biodiversity, leading to the disruption of ecosystems. Many other islands faced environmental damage such as Samoa.

However, visitors are attracted to the less industrial scene of these islands, and according to a survey, over 80 percent of the people enjoyed the natural landscape when they visited, many commenting that they wanted to protect and save the wildlife in the area. Many tourists have turned to practices of sustainable tourism and ecotourism in an attempt to save the nature they enjoy in these locations, while some political entities try to enforce this in an attempt to keep tourism in their island afloat.

More information on Sustainable Tourism.

== Health impacts ==
Tourism brings both positive and negative effects on the health of local people. The short-term negative effects are related to the density of tourist arrivals, traffic congestion, crowding, crime level, and other stressful factors. Inbound tourism also increases the spread of SARS, MERS, COVID-19, and other diseases that transmit from human to human, which recently led to closed borders, travel restrictions, canceled flights, etc.

Road accidents are another negative outcome of tourism development since visitors are not aware of local rules, driving norms, and road conditions. Furthermore, alcohol-related crash rates are significantly higher for tourists.

The positive long-term health outcomes of tourism arrivals can be explained by the influence of positive experiences and social interactions with visitors on physical health and longevity. The literature suggests that diverse social relationships lead to lower risks for morbidity and premature mortality. Since diverse interactions of local people with tourists provide positive experiences that could affect physical health, tourism development might positively influence the health of the local people in the long run through positive emotions and social interactions.

Sexually transmitted infections are also often transferred between visitors and residents.

== See also ==
- Biopsychosocial model
- Broaden-and-build
- Impacts of poverty on health
- Overtourism
- Sustainable tourism
- Tourismphobia
