= Tourism carrying capacity =

Maximum visitors that a resort can accept

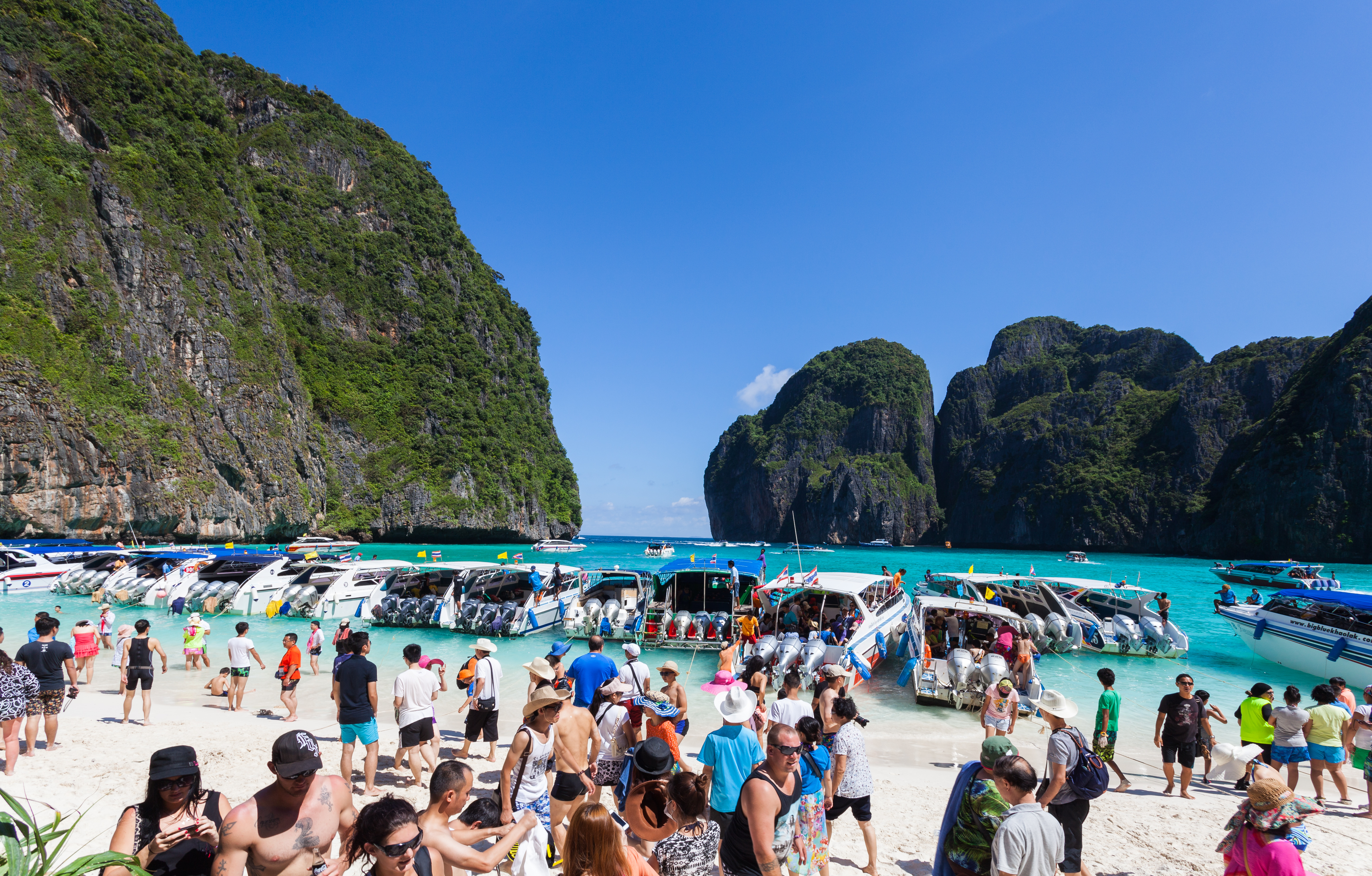
Overcrowded tourists at Maya beach, Thailand, in 2013

Tourism carrying capacity (TCC) is an imperfect but useful approach to managing visitors in vulnerable areas. The TCC concept evolved out of the fields of range, habitat and wildlife management. In these fields, managers attempted to determine the largest population of a particular species that could be supported by a habitat over a long period of time.

"Tourism Carrying Capacity" is defined by the World Tourism Organization as "The maximum number of people that may visit a tourist destination at the same time, without causing destruction of the physical, economic, socio-cultural environment and an unacceptable decrease in the quality of visitors' satisfaction". Whereas Middleton and Hawkins Chamberlain (1997) define it as "the level of human activity an area can accommodate without the area deteriorating, the resident community being adversely affected or the quality of visitors experience declining" what both these definitions pick up on is that the carrying capacity is the point at which a destination or attraction starts experiencing adverse effects as a result of the number of visitors.

Although it is challenging to pinpoint a specific number of visitors beyond which damage begins, even an imperfect estimate of the TCC can guide policies that cap the number of visitors and reduce the environmental impact of tourism. For example, the government of Peru limits the number of hikers on the Inca Trail to 500 per day, because geologists warned that a larger number could cause serious erosion.

One example of managing tourism carrying capacity is evident in the Inca Trail, particularly during high-demand months like March. The Peruvian government has implemented strict regulations, including limiting the number of daily permits for trekkers, to preserve the environment and the cultural heritage of the trail. As outlined by Life Expeditions, understanding the climate and preparing adequately for the trek, such as by choosing the right time to visit and following environmental guidelines, plays a crucial role in mitigating the impact of tourism on this fragile ecosystem.

At the extreme, in areas where the objective is to maintain pristine conditions, any level of visitor use creates adverse or negative impacts, suggesting that the carrying capacity is zero. The acceptable level of damage is a matter of human judgment. Understanding what is acceptable is the focus of the limits of acceptable change planning process referred to later in this article.

There are numerous forms of carrying capacity relevant to tourism. This article will focus on the four most commonly used.

== Physical carrying capacity ==
This is the maximum number of tourists that an area is actually able to support. In the case of an individual tourist attraction it is the maximum number that can fit on the site at any given time and still allow people to be able to move. This is normally assumed to be around 1m per person. "PCC per a day = area (in metres squared) x visitors per metre x daily duration" (Mowforth and Munt) This is a formula which has been used to calculate the physical carrying capacity.

== Economic carrying capacity ==
This relates to a level of acceptable change within the local economy of a tourist destination, it is the extent to which a tourist destination is able to accommodate tourist functions without the loss of local activities, take for example a souvenir store taking the place of a shop selling essential items to the local community. Economic carrying capacity can also be used to describe the point at which the increased revenue brought by tourism development is overtaken by the inflation caused by tourism

== Social carrying capacity ==
This relates to the negative socio-cultural impacts associated with tourism development. The indicators of when the social carrying capacity has been exceeded are a reduced local tolerance for tourism as described by Doxey's Index of irritation. Reduced visitor enjoyment and increased crime are also indicators of when the social carrying capacity has been exceeded.

== Biophysical carrying capacity ==
This relates to the extent to which the natural environment is able to tolerate interference from tourists. This is made more complicated by the fact that because it deals with ecology which is able to regenerate to some extent so in this case, the carrying capacity is when the damage exceeds the habitat's ability to regenerate.

Environmental carrying capacity is also used with reference to ecological and physical parameters, capacity of resources, ecosystems and infrastructure.

== Weaknesses of carrying capacity ==
Authors such as Buckley, Wagar, Washburne, McCool, and Stankey have critiqued the concept as being flawed in both the conceptual assumptions made and its practical application. For example, the notion of a carrying capacity assumes that various elements, such as the social-ecological systems in which tourism destinations are situated, are stable. But some situations are dynamically complex and some outcomes are impossible to predict. To implement a carrying capacity flawlessly would require either a stable situation or the ability to adjust entry limits based on changing conditions. Implementation also requires a means of monitoring entry, and when demand exceeds a limit, the ways in which scarce opportunities are allocated are contentious. For example, the trail capacity limits on entries into the Hardrock 100 running race in Colorado result in many disappointed runners. Nonetheless, the benefits of limiting the entries to a number that avoids harm to surrounding wilderness arguably exceed the costs.

The main criticism of carrying capacity on a practical level is that it is difficult to calculate. A safe solution is to set the limit at a conservative estimate of the capacity. The maximum number of visitors depends on how the tourists behave: 'a large group of bird watchers moving through a landscape will have a different impact compared to a similar sized group of school children.' The carrying capacity also depends on changing conditions at the site. In the case of national parks, visitor impacts change with seasons.

UNESCO (the organization responsible for administrating the World Heritage list) has expressed a concern that the use of carrying capacity can give the impression that a site is better protected than it actually is, it points out that although the whole site may be below carrying capacity part of the site may still be crowded.

In the context of tourism in wildlife sanctuaries, Singh (2013) writes, 'carrying capacity' is a concept to be thought about when we intend for 'sustainable versus full harvest/utilization of resource for a purpose'. In wildlife sanctuaries 'full utilization of infrastructure or resources for tourism' is a remote mandate. Hence, instead of 'carrying capacity,' some people recommend guidelines or regulations that prevent tourism from disturbing wildlife in ways other than limiting the volume of tourism. In cases where such regulations are easier to establish and implement than policies based on carrying capacity, regulations will perhaps be sustainable for both wildlife conservation and the tourism industry. In many other cases, limits based on estimates of the tourism carrying capacity are implemented with beneficial effects.

== Limits of acceptable change ==
Limits of acceptable change was the first of the post-carrying-capacity visitor management frameworks developed to respond to the practical and conceptual challenges of carrying capacity. The framework was developed by The U.S. Forest Service in the 1980s. It is based on the idea that, rather than there being a threshold of visitor numbers, in fact any tourist activity has an impact and therefore management should be based on constant monitoring of the site as well as the objectives established for it. A maximum number of visitors can be established within the limits of acceptable change framework, but such maximums are only one tool among many that are available. The framework is frequently summarized into a nine step process.

1. Identify area concerns and issues.

2. Define and describe opportunity classes (based on the concept of ROS).

3. Select indicators of resource and social conditions.

4. Inventory existing resource and social conditions.

5. Specify standards for resource and social indicators for each opportunity class.

6. Identify alternative opportunity class allocations.

7. Identify management actions for each alternative.

8. Evaluate and select preferred alternatives.

9. Implement actions and monitor conditions.

There is a difference of LAC as a concept and LAC as a planning framework..

== Visitor experience and resource protection ==
This framework is based on the idea that not enough attention has been given to the experience of tourists and their views on environmental quality. This framework is similar in origin to LAC, but was originally designed to meet the legislative, policy and administrative needs of the US National Park Service.

== Descriptive and evaluative ==
The process of estimating Tourism Carrying Capacity (TCC) has been described as having a descriptive and evaluative part. It follows (in principle) the conceptual framework for TCC as described by Shelby and Heberlein (1986), and these parts are described as follows:

Descriptive part (A): Describes how the system (tourist destination) under study works, including physical, ecological, social, political and economic aspects of tourist development. Within this context of particular importance is the identification of:

- Constraints: limiting factors that cannot be easily managed. They are inflexible, in the sense that the application of organisational, planning, and management approaches, or the development of appropriate infrastructure does not alter the thresholds associated with such constraints.
- Bottlenecks: limiting factors of the system which managers can manipulate (number of visitors at a particular place).
- Impacts: elements of the system affected by the intensity and type of use. The type of impact determines the type of capacity (ecological-physical, social, etc.). Emphasis should be placed on significant impacts.

Evaluative part (B): Describes how an area should be managed and the level of acceptable environmental impacts. This part of the process starts with the identification (if it does not already exist) of the desirable condition or preferable type of development. Within this context, goals and management objectives need to be defined, alternative fields of actions evaluated and a strategy for tourist development formulated. On the basis of this, Tourism Carrying Capacity can be defined. Within this context, of particular importance is the identification of:

- Goals and/or objectives: (i.e. to define the type of experience or other outcomes which a recreational setting should provide).

=== Differing definitions ===
First of all, the carrying capacity can be the motivation to attract tourists visit the destination. The tourism industry, especially in national parks and protected areas, is subject to the concept of carrying capacity so as to determine the scale of tourist activities which can be sustained at specific times in different places. Various scholar over the years have developed several arguments developed about the definition of carrying capacity. Middleton and Hawkins defined carrying capacity as a measure of the tolerance of a site or building which is open to tourist activities, and the limit beyond which an area may suffer from the adverse impacts of tourism (Middleton & Hawkins, 1998). Chamberlain defined it as the level of human activity which an area can accommodate without either it deteriorating, the resident community being adversely affected or the quality of visitors' experience declining (Chamberlain, 1997). Clark defined carrying capacity as a certain threshold (level) of tourism activity, beyond which there will be damage to the environment and its natural inhabitants (Clark, 1997).

The World Tourism Organization argues that carrying capacity is the maximum number of people who may visit a tourist destination at the same time, without causing destruction of the physical, economic and socio-cultural environment and/or an unacceptable decrease in the quality of visitors' satisfaction (https://ec.europa.eu/environment/iczm/pdf/tcca_material.pdf. Date assessed 08/03/07). In the publication, 'Agenda 21 for the Travel and Tourism Venture: towards environmentally sustainable development', the Secretary-General of the World Tourism Organization.

== As part of a planning system ==
The definitions of carrying capacity need to be considered as processes within a planning process for tourism development which involves:

- Setting capacity limits for sustaining tourism activities in an area. This involves a vision about local development & decisions about managing tourism.
- Overall measuring of tourism carrying capacity does not have to lead to a single number, like the number of visitors (https://ec.europa.eu/environment/iczm/pdf/tcca_material.pdf. Date assessed 08/03/07).
- In addition, carrying capacity may contain various limits in respect to the three components (physical-ecological, socio-demographic and political–economic).

"Carrying capacity is not just a scientific concept or formula of obtaining a number beyond which development should cease, but a process where the eventual limits must be considered as guidance. They should be carefully assessed and monitored, complemented with other standards, etc. Carrying capacity is not fixed. It develops with time and the growth of tourism and can be affected by management techniques and controls" (Saveriades, 2000).

The reason for considering carrying capacity as a process, rather than a means of protection of various areas is in spite of the fact that carrying capacity was once a guiding concept in recreation and tourism management literature. Because of its conceptual elusiveness, lack of management utility and inconsistent effectiveness in minimizing visitors' impacts, carrying capacity has been largely re-conceptualized into management by objectives approaches, namely: the limits of acceptable change (LAC), and the visitor experience and resource protection (VERP) as the two planning and management decision-making processes based on the new understanding of carrying capacity (Lindberg and McCool, 1998). These two have been deemed more appropriate in the tourism planning processes of protected areas, especially in the United States, and have over the years been adapted and modified for use in sustainable tourism and ecotourism contexts (Wallace, 1993; McCool, 1994; Harroun and Boo, 1995).

== See also ==
- Ecotourism
- Overtourism
