= Outline of academic disciplines =

Overview of and topical guide to academic disciplines

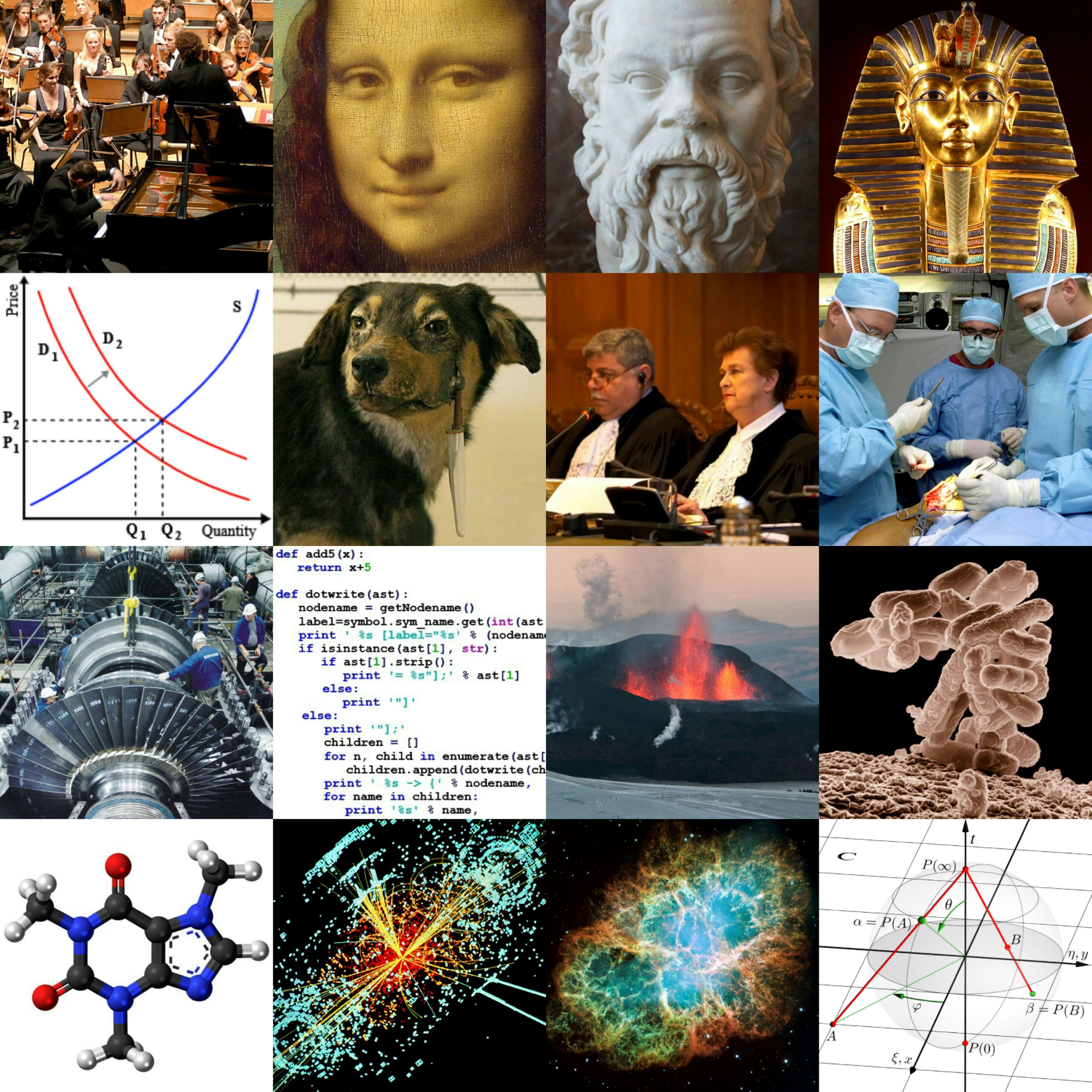
Collage of images representing different academic disciplines

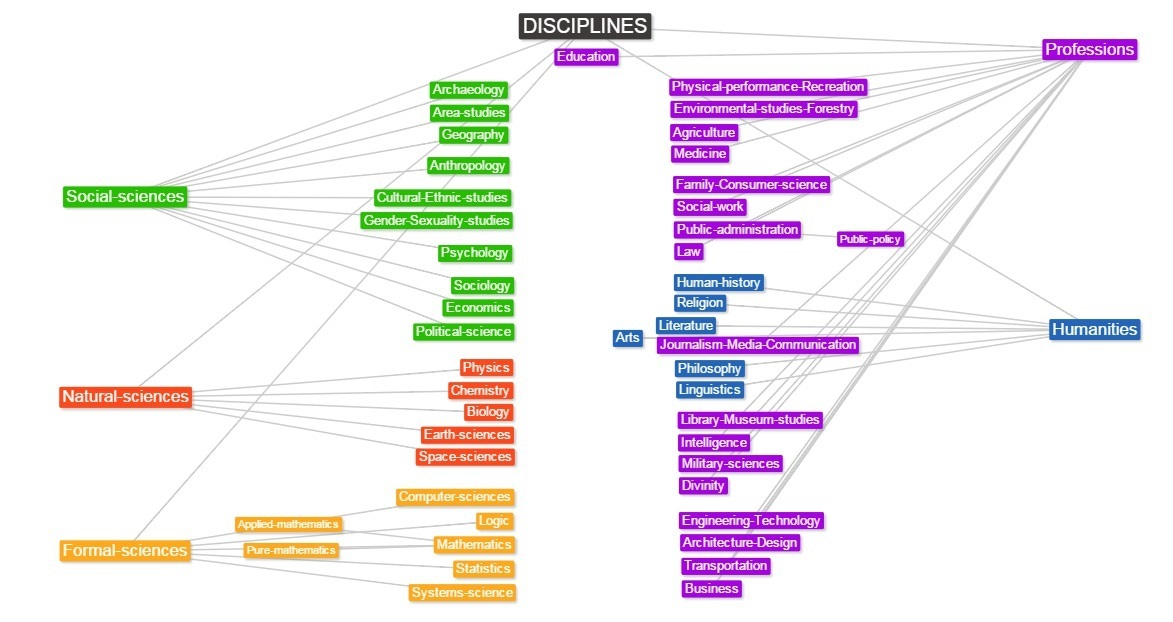
Mind map of top level disciplines and professions

An academic discipline or academic field is a subdivision of knowledge that is taught and researched at the college or university level. Disciplines are defined (in part) and recognized by the academic journals in which research is published, and the learned societies and academic departments or faculties within colleges and universities to which their practitioners belong. Academic disciplines are conventionally divided into the humanities (including philosophy, languages, art and cultural studies), the natural sciences (such as physics, chemistry, and biology); and the formal sciences like mathematics and computer science. The social sciences are sometimes considered a fourth category. It is also known as a field of study, field of inquiry, research field and branch of knowledge. The different terms are used in different countries and fields.

Individuals associated with academic disciplines are commonly referred to as experts or specialists. Others, who may have studied liberal arts or systems theory rather than concentrating in a specific academic discipline, are classified as generalists.

The following outline provides an overview of and topical guide to academic disciplines. In each case, an entry at the highest level of the hierarchy (e.g., Humanities) is a group of broadly similar disciplines; an entry at the next highest level (e.g., Music) is a discipline having some degree of autonomy and being the fundamental identity felt by its scholars. Lower levels of the hierarchy are sub-disciplines that do generally not have any role in the title of the university's governance. The proper criteria for organizing knowledge into disciplines is open to debate.

== Humanities ==
=== Performing arts ===
- Music (outline)
  - Accompanying
  - Chamber music
  - Church music
  - Conducting
    - Choral conducting
    - Orchestral conducting
    - Wind ensemble conducting
  - Early music
  - Jazz studies (outline)
  - Musical composition
  - Music education
  - Music genre
    - List of music genres and styles
  - Musicology
    - Historical musicology
    - Systematic musicology
    - Ethnomusicology
  - Music theory
  - Orchestral studies
  - Organology
    - Organ and historical keyboards
    - Piano
    - Strings, harp, oud, and guitar (outline)
    - Singing
    - Woodwinds, brass, and percussion
  - Recording
- Dance (outline)
  - Choreography
  - Dance notation
  - Ethnochoreology
  - History of dance
- Television (outline)
  - Television studies
- Theatre (outline)
  - Acting
  - Directing
  - Dramaturgy
  - History of theatre
  - Musical theatre
  - Playwrighting
  - Puppetry
  - Scenography
  - Stage design
  - Ventriloquism
- Film (outline)
  - Animation
  - Film criticism
  - Filmmaking
  - Film theory
  - Film studies
  - Live action
- Oral literature
  - Public speaking
  - Performance poetry
  - Spoken word
  - Storytelling
- Electronic game
  - Arcade game
  - Audio game
  - Outline of video games

=== Visual arts ===
- Applied arts
  - Craft
    - Calligraphy
    - Decorative arts
    - Fashion
    - Paper craft
    - Textile arts
    - Woodwork
    - Metalwork
    - Pottery
    - Graphic design
  - Architecture (Outline of architecture)
    - Interior architecture
    - Landscape architecture
      - Landscape design
      - Landscape planning
    - Architectural analytics
    - Historic preservation
    - Interior design (interior architecture)
    - Technical drawing
- Art director
- Fine arts
  - Graphic arts
    - Drawing (outline)
    - Painting (outline)
    - Photography (outline)
    - Printmaking
  - Sculpture (outline)
- Digital art
  - 3D Modeling
  - Animation
  - Digital painting
- Mixed media
- Studio art
- Culinary Arts
  - Food photography
  - Food presentation
  - Gourmet

=== History ===
Also regarded as a Social science

- Prehistory
- Ancient history
  - Ancient Egypt
  - Carthage
  - Ancient Greek history (outline)
  - Ancient Roman history (outline)
    - History of the Roman Republic
    - History of the Roman Empire
  - Ancient Chinese history (outline)
  - Ancient Middle Eastern history
  - Assyrian Civilization
  - Bronze Age Civilizations
  - Biblical history
  - History of the Indus Valley Civilization
  - Preclassic Maya
  - History of Mesopotamia
  - The Stone Age
  - History of the Yangtze civilization
  - History of the Yellow River civilization
- Modern history
- Asian history
  - Chinese history
  - Japanese history
  - Korean history
  - Mongolian history
  - Indian history (outline)
  - Indonesian history
  - Turkish history
  - Iranian history
  - Vietnamese history
  - Philippine history
- Australian history
- European history
  - British history
  - French history
  - German history
  - Dutch history
  - Italian history
  - Spanish history
  - Portuguese history
  - Polish history
  - Balkan history
  - Scandinavian history
    - Swedish history
    - Norwegian history
    - Danish history
    - Finnish history
    - Icelandic history
  - Russian history
- African history
  - South African history
  - Egyptian history
  - East and Central African history
  - Nigerian history
- Pre-Columbian era history
- Pan-American history
  - North American history
    - American history
    - Canadian history
    - Mexican history
    - Cuban history
  - South American history
    - Latin American history
    - Brazilian history
    - Colombian history
    - Venezuelan history
    - Peruvian history
    - Argentine history
  - Pre-Columbian era
    - Mayan history
    - Aztec history
    - Inca history
    - Mississippian culture* Art History
- Latin American history
- Jewish history
- Cultural history
- Ecclesiastical history of the Catholic Church
- Economic history
- Environmental history
- Intellectual history
- Philosophical history
  - Ancient philosophy
  - Contemporary philosophy
  - Medieval philosophy
    - Humanism (outline)
    - Scholasticism
  - Modern philosophy
- Political history
  - History of political thought
- Public history
- Scientific history
- Technological history
- World history

=== Languages and literature ===
Linguistics listed in Social science

- Comics studies
- Classics (outline)
- Comparative literature
- Creative writing
  - Poetry
  - Prose
  - Non-fiction
  - Fiction (outline)
  - Creative nonfiction
  - Literary journalism
  - Screenwriting
  - Playwrighting
- English studies
- English literature
- History of literature
  - Ancient literature
  - Medieval literature
  - Post-colonial literature
  - Post-modern literature
- Literary genre
- Literary theory
  - Critical theory (outline)
  - Literary criticism
  - Poetics
  - Rhetoric
- Languages
  - Business English
  - Classical language
  - Modern language
  - Standard English
  - World Englishes
- World literature
  - American literature
    - African-American literature
    - Southern literature
  - British literature
  - Canadian literature
  - Indian English literature
  - Irish literature
  - New Zealand literature
  - Scottish literature
  - South African literature
  - Welsh literature

=== Law ===
Also regarded as a Social science

- Legal management (academic discipline)
  - Corporate law
  - Mercantile law
  - Business law
- Administrative law
- Canon law
- Comparative law
- Constitutional law
- Competition law
- Criminal law
  - Criminal procedure
  - Criminal justice (outline)
    - Police science
    - Forensic science (outline)
- Islamic law
- Jewish law (outline)
- Jurisprudence (Philosophy of Law)
- Civil law
  - Admiralty law
  - Animal law/Animal rights
  - Common law
  - Corporations
  - Civil procedure
  - Contract law
  - Environmental law
  - Family law
  - Federal law
  - International law
    - Public international law
    - Supranational law
  - Labor law
  - Paralegal studies
  - Property law
  - Tax law
  - Tort law (outline)
- Law enforcement (outline)
- Procedural law
- Substantive law

=== Philosophy ===
Also regarded as the separate, an entry at the highest level of the hierarchy

- Aesthetics (outline) / Philosophy of art
- Applied philosophy
  - Philosophy of economics
  - Philosophy of education
  - Philosophy of engineering
  - Philosophy of history
  - Philosophy of language
  - Philosophy of law
  - Philosophy of mathematics
  - Philosophy of music
  - Philosophy of psychology
  - Philosophy of religion
  - Philosophy of physical sciences
    - Philosophy of biology
    - Philosophy of chemistry
    - Philosophy of physics
  - Philosophy of social science
  - Philosophy of technology
  - Systems philosophy
  - Political philosophy and Social philosophy
    - Anarchism (outline)
    - Feminist philosophy
    - Libertarianism (outline)
    - Marxism
- Epistemology (outline)
  - Justification
  - Reasoning errors
- Ethics (outline)
  - Applied ethics
    - Animal rights
    - Bioethics
    - Environmental ethics
  - Meta-ethics
  - Moral psychology, Descriptive ethics, Value theory
  - Normative ethics
    - Virtue ethics
- Logic (outline)
  - Mathematical logic
  - Philosophical logic
- Meta-philosophy
- Metaphysics (outline)
  - Philosophy of Action
  - Determinism and Free will
  - Ontology
  - Philosophy of mind
    - Philosophy of pain
    - Philosophy of artificial intelligence
    - Philosophy of perception
    - Neurophilosophy
  - Philosophy of space and time
  - Teleology
  - Theism and Atheism
- Philosophical traditions and schools
  - African philosophy
  - Analytic philosophy
  - Aristotelianism
  - Continental philosophy
  - Eastern philosophy
  - Feminist philosophy
  - Islamic philosophy
  - Platonism
- History of philosophy
  - Ancient philosophy
  - Medieval philosophy
    - Scholasticism
    - Humanism (outline)
  - Modern philosophy
  - Contemporary philosophy

=== Religious studies ===
Also regarded as a social science

- History of Religion
- Anthropology of Religion
- Sociology of Religion
- Psychology of Religion
- Phenomenology of Religion
- Philosophy of Religion
- Comparative religion
- Mythology and Folklore
- Theism
- Irreligion

=== Divinity ===
- Canon law
- Church history
- Field ministry
  - Pastoral counseling
  - Pastoral theology
  - Religious education techniques
  - Homiletics
  - Liturgy
  - Sacred music
  - Missiology
- Hermeneutics
- Scriptural study and languages
  - Avestan
  - Biblical Hebrew
  - Biblical studies/Sacred Scripture
  - Classical Arabic
  - Classical Armenian
  - Coptic
  - Ge'ez
  - Koine Greek
  - Latin
  - Old Church Slavonic
  - Old Georgian
  - Pali
  - Syriac
  - Vedic Sanskrit (Vedas)
- Theology (outline)
  - Dogmatic theology
  - Ecclesiology
  - Sacramental theology
  - Systematic theology
  - Christian ethics
  - Hindu ethics
  - Moral theology
  - Historical theology

=== Theology ===
- Biblical studies
  - Biblical Hebrew, Koine Greek, Aramaic
- Buddhist theology
  - Pali Studies
- Christian theology (outline)
  - Anglican theology
  - Baptist theology
  - Catholic theology
  - Eastern Orthodox theology
  - Protestant theology
- Hindu theology
  - Sanskrit Studies
  - Dravidian Studies
- Jewish theology
- Muslim theology
  - Arabic Studies
- Buddhist studies

=== Religion ===
- Abrahamic religions
  - Christianity (outline)
    - Christian theology (outline)
  - Islam (outline)/ Islamic studies
  - Judaism (outline)/ Jewish studies
- Apologetics
- Indian religions
  - Buddhism (outline)/ Buddhist studies
  - Hinduism (outline)
  - Jainism
  - Sikhism (outline)
- East Asian religions
  - Chinese folk religion
  - Confucianism
  - Shinto
  - Daoism (outline)
  - I-Kuan Tao
  - Caodaism
  - Chondogyo
  - Tenrikyo
  - Oomoto
- Other religions
  - African religions
  - Ancient Egyptian religion
  - Native American religions
  - Gnosticism
  - Occult
  - Esotericism
  - Mysticism
  - Spirituality
  - New religious movements
  - Sumerian religion
  - Zoroastrianism
- Comparative religion
- Mythology and Folklore
- Theism
- Irreligion
  - Agnosticism
  - Atheism (outline) and religious humanism
  - Nontheism

== Social science ==
=== Anthropology ===
- Archaeology (outline)
  - Biocultural anthropology
  - Feminist archaeology
  - Maritime archaeology
- Anthropological criminology
- Anthropological linguistics
  - Synchronic linguistics (or Descriptive linguistics)
  - Diachronic linguistics (or Historical linguistics)
  - Ethnolinguistics
  - Semiotic anthropology
  - Sociolinguistics
- Anthrozoology
- Biological anthropology
  - Gene-culture coevolution
  - Evolutionary anthropology
  - Forensic anthropology
  - Human behavioral ecology
  - Human evolution
  - Medical anthropology
  - Molecular anthropology
  - Neuroanthropology
  - Nutritional anthropology
  - Paleoanthropology
  - Population genetics
  - Primatology
- Biocultural anthropology
- Cultural anthropology
  - Anthropology of development
  - Anthropology of religion
  - Applied anthropology
  - Cognitive anthropology
  - Cyborg anthropology
  - Digital anthropology
  - Digital culture
  - Ecological anthropology
  - Economic anthropology
  - Environmental anthropology
  - Ethnobiology
  - Ethnobotany
  - Ethnography
  - Ethnohistory
  - Ethnology
  - Ethnomuseology
  - Ethnomusicology
  - Feminist anthropology
  - Folklore
  - Kinship
  - Legal anthropology
  - Mythology
  - Missiology
  - Political anthropology
  - Political economic anthropology
  - Psychological anthropology
  - Public anthropology
  - Symbolic anthropology
  - Transpersonal anthropology
  - Urban anthropology
- Linguistic anthropology
- Social anthropology
  - Anthropology of art
  - Anthropology of institutions
  - Anthropology of media
  - Visual anthropology
- Sociocultural anthropology

==== Archaeology ====
- Aerial archaeology
- Aviation archaeology
- Anthracology
- Archaeo-optics
- Archaeoacoustics
- Archaeoastronomy
- Archaeogeography
- Archaeological culture
- Archaeological theory
  - Great ages archaeology
  - Functionalism
  - Processualism
  - Post-processualism
  - Cognitive archaeology
  - Gender archaeology
  - Feminist archaeology
- Archaeometry
  - Archaeogenetics
  - Bioarchaeology
  - Computational archaeology
  - Dendrochronology
  - Geoarchaeology
  - Isotope analysis
  - Palynology
  - Radiocarbon dating
  - Zooarchaeology
- Archaeology of religion and ritual
- Archaeology of trade
- Archaeomythology
- Architectural analytics
- Battlefield archaeology
- Calceology
- Conflict archaeology
- Data archaeology
- Digital archaeology
- Experimental archaeology
- Environmental archaeology
- Ethnoarchaeology
- Forensic archaeology
- Glyptology
- History of archaeology
- Household archaeology
- Landscape archaeology and Landscape history
- Manuscriptology
- Maritime archaeology
- Media archaeology
- Modern archaeology
  - Settlement archaeology
- Music archaeology
- Osteology
- Palaeoarchaeology
- Paleoanthropology
- Paleoethnobotany
- Paleopathology
- Paleoradiology
- Taphonomy
- Urban archaeology
- Historical archaeology
  - Prehistoric archaeology
  - protohistoric archaeology
  - Biblical archaeology
  - Classical archaeology
  - Egyptology
  - Assyriology
  - Etruscology
  - Near Eastern archaeology
  - Medieval archaeology
  - Post-medieval archaeology
  - Industrial archaeology
  - Contemporary archaeology

=== Business ===
- Accounting
  - Accounting research
  - Accounting scholarship
- Business administration
- Business analysis
- Business ethics
- Business law
- Corporate governance
- E-Business
- Entrepreneurship
- Decision science
- Finance (outline)
- Industrial and labor relations
  - Collective bargaining
  - Human resources
  - Organizational studies
  - Labor economics
  - Labor history
- Information technology (outline)
  - Information systems (Business informatics)
  - Management information systems
  - Health informatics
- International trade
- Management (outline)
- Marketing (outline)
- Operations management
- Purchasing
- Risk management and insurance
- Strategy or Strategic Management
- Systems science

=== Economics ===
- Agricultural economics
- Anarchist economics
- Applied economics
- Behavioural economics
- Bioeconomics
- Business
- Complexity economics
- Computational economics
- Consumer economics
- Development economics
- Digital economy
- Ecological economics
- Econometrics
- Economic geography
- Economic history
- Economic sector
- Economic sociology
- Economic systems
- Economic value
- Education economics
- Energy economics
- Entrepreneurial economics
- Environmental economics
- Evolutionary economics
- Experimental economics
- Feminist economics
- Family economics
- Financial economics
- Financial econometrics
- Green economics
- Growth economics
- Human development theory
- Industrial organization
- Information economics
- Institutional economics
- International economics
- Islamic economics
- JEL classification codes in searching for articles by fields in economics journals
- Knowledge economy
- Labor economics
- Health economics
- Law and economics
- Macroeconomics
- Managerial economics
- Market economy
- Marxian economics
- Mathematical economics
- Microeconomics
- Monetary economics
- Neuroeconomics
- Participatory economics
- Political economy
- Public economics
- Public choice
- Public finance
- Real estate economics
- Resource economics
- Social choice theory
- Socialist economics
- Socioeconomics
- Transport economics
- Welfare economics

=== Futurology ===
(also known as future studies or prospective studies)

Main articles: Outline of futures studies and Futures studies

- Cashless society
- Climate

=== Geography ===
- Physical geography (is also listed in Earth Science)
  - Atmology
  - Biogeography
  - Climatology
    - Palaeoclimatology
  - Coastal geography
  - Emergency management
  - Environmental geography
  - Geobiology
  - Geochemistry
  - Geographic information systems
  - Geology
  - Geomatics
  - Geomorphology
  - Geodesy
  - Geophysics
  - Glaciology
  - Hydrology/Hydrography
    - Glaciology
    - Limnology
    - Biogeochemistry
    - Oceanography
  - Landscape ecology
  - Lithology
  - Meteorology
  - Mineralogy
  - Oceanography
  - Palaeogeography
  - Palaeontology
  - Petrology
  - Quaternary science
  - Soil geography
- Human geography
  - Behavioural geography
  - Cognitive geography
  - Cultural geography
    - Feminist geography
  - Development geography
  - Economic geography
  - Health geography
  - Historical geography
  - Language geography
  - Mathematical geography
  - Marketing geography
  - Military geography
  - Political geography and Geopolitics
  - Population geography
  - Religion geography
  - Social geography
  - Children's geographies
  - Strategic geography
  - Time geography
  - Tourism geography
  - Transport geography
  - Urban geography
- Integrated geography
- Cartography (outline)
  - Celestial cartography
  - Planetary cartography
  - Topography
- Navigation
- Regional geography
- Remote sensing

=== Linguistics ===
Also regarded as a formal science

- Applied linguistics
- Composition studies
- Computational linguistics
- Discourse analysis
- English studies
- Etymology
- Grammar
- Grammatology
- Historical linguistics
- History of linguistics
- Interlinguistics
- Lexicology
- Linguistic typology
- Morphology
- Natural language processing
- Philosophy of language
- Philosophy of linguistics
- Philology
- Phonetics
- Phonology
- Pragmatics
- Psycholinguistics
- Rhetoric
- Semantics
- Semiotics (outline)
- Sociolinguistics
- Syntax
- Terminology science
- Usage
- Word usage

=== Political science ===
- American politics
- Canadian politics
- Civics
- Health politics
- Biopolitics
- Comparative politics
- European studies
- Geopolitics (Political geography)
- Indian politics
- International relations
- International organizations
- Nationalism studies
- Peace and conflict studies
- Policy studies
- Political behavior
- Political culture
- Political economy
- Political history
- Political philosophy
- Public administration
  - Nonprofit administration
  - Non-governmental organization (NGO) administration
- Public law
- Public policy
- Psephology
- Social choice theory
- Singapore politics

=== Psychology ===
- Abnormal psychology
- Applied psychology
- Biological psychology
- Clinical neuropsychology
- Clinical psychology
- Cognitive psychology
- Community psychology
- Comparative psychology
- Conservation psychology
- Consumer psychology
- Counseling psychology
- Criminal psychology
- Cultural psychology
  - Asian psychology
  - Black psychology
- Developmental psychology
- Differential psychology
- Ecological psychology
- Educational psychology
- Environmental psychology
- Evolutionary psychology
- Experimental psychology
- Group psychology
- Family psychology
- Feminine psychology
- Forensic developmental psychology
- Forensic psychology
- Health psychology
- Humanistic psychology
- Indigenous psychology
- Legal psychology
- Mathematical psychology
- Media psychology
- Medical psychology
- Military psychology
- Moral psychology and Descriptive ethics
- Music psychology
- Neuropsychology
- Occupational health psychology
- Occupational psychology
- Organizational psychology (a.k.a., Industrial Psychology)
- Parapsychology (outline)
- Pediatric psychology
- Pedology (children study)
- Personality psychology
- Phenomenology
- Political psychology
- Positive psychology
- Problem solving
- Psychoanalysis
- Psychobiology
- Psychology of religion
- Psychometrics
- Psychopathology
  - Child psychopathology
- Psychophysics
- Quantitative psychology
- Rehabilitation psychology
- School psychology
- Social psychology
- Sport psychology
- Traffic psychology
- Transpersonal psychology
- Travel psychology

=== Sociology ===
- Analytical sociology
- Applied sociology
  - Leisure studies
  - Political sociology
  - Public sociology
  - Social engineering
- Architectural sociology
- Area studies
  - African studies
  - American studies
    - Appalachian studies
    - Canadian studies
    - Latin American studies
  - Asian studies
    - Central Asian studies
    - East Asian studies
    - Filipinology
    - Iranian studies
    - Japanese studies
    - Korean studies
    - Sinology (outline)
    - Indology (South Asian studies)
      - Bengal studies
      - Dravidian studies (Dravidology)
      - Tamilology
      - Pakistan studies
      - Sindhology
    - Southeast Asian studies
    - Thai studies
  - Australian studies
  - European studies
    - Celtic studies
    - German studies
    - Sociology in Poland
    - Scandinavian studies
    - Slavic studies
  - Middle Eastern studies
    - Arab studies
    - Assyriology
    - Egyptology
    - Jewish studies
- Behavioral sociology
- Chinese sociology
- Collective behavior
  - Social movements
  - Activism
- Social phenomenon
- Community informatics
  - Social network analysis
- Comparative sociology
- Conflict theory
- Criminology/Criminal justice (outline)
- Critical management studies
- Critical sociology
- Cultural sociology
- Cultural studies/ethnic studies
  - Africana studies
  - Cross-cultural studies
  - Culturology
  - Deaf studies
  - Ethnology
  - Utopian studies
  - Whiteness studies
- Demography/Population
- Digital sociology
- Dramaturgical sociology
- Economic sociology
- Educational sociology
- Empirical sociology
- Environmental sociology
- Evolutionary sociology
- Feminist sociology
- Figurational sociology
- Futures studies (outline)
- Gender studies
  - Men's studies
  - Women's studies
  - Queer studies
- Historical sociology
- Human ecology
- Humanistic sociology
- Industrial sociology
- Interactionism
- Interpretive sociology
  - Ethnomethodology
  - Phenomenology
  - Social constructionism
  - Symbolic interactionism
- Jealousy sociology
- Macrosociology
- Marxist sociology
- Mathematical sociology
- Medical sociology
- Mesosociology
- Microsociology
- Military sociology
- Natural resource sociology
- Organizational theory
  - Organizational studies
- Phenomenological sociology
- Policy sociology
- Postcolonialism
- Psychoanalytic sociology
- Science studies/Science and technology studies
- Sexology
  - Heterosexism
  - Human sexual behavior
  - Human sexuality (outline)
  - Queer studies/Queer theory
  - Sex education
- Social capital
- Social change
- Social conflict theory
- Social control
  - Pure sociology
- Social economy
- Social philosophy
- Social policy
- Social psychology
- Social stratification
- Social theory
- Social research
- Social transformation
  - Computational sociology
  - Economic sociology/Socioeconomics
    - Economic development
    - Social development
    - Social development
- Sociobiology
- Sociocybernetics
- Sociolinguistics
- Sociology of aging
- Sociology of agriculture
- Sociology of art
- Sociology of autism
- Sociology of childhood
- Sociology of conflict
- Sociology of culture
- Sociology of cyberspace
- Sociology of development
- Sociology of deviance
- Sociology of disaster
- Sociology of education
- Sociology of emotions
- Sociology of fatherhood
- Sociology of film
- Sociology of finance
- Sociology of food
- Sociology of gender
- Sociology of generations
- Sociology of globalization
- Sociology of government
- Sociology of health and illness
- Sociology of human consciousness
- Sociology of immigration
- Sociology of knowledge
- Sociology of language
- Sociology of law
- Sociology of leisure
- Sociology of literature
- Sociology of markets
- Sociology of marriage
- Sociology of motherhood
- Sociology of music
- Sociology of natural resources
- Sociology of organizations
- Sociology of peace, war, and social conflict
- Sociology of punishment
- Sociology of race and ethnic relations
- Sociology of religion
- Sociology of risk
- Sociology of science
- Sociology of scientific knowledge
- Sociology of social change
- Sociology of social movements
- Sociology of space
- Sociology of sport
- Sociology of technology
- Sociology of terrorism
- Sociology of the body
- Sociology of the family
- Sociology of the history of science
- Sociology of the Internet
- Sociology of work
- Sociomusicology
- Structural sociology
- Theoretical sociology
- Urban studies or Urban sociology/Rural sociology
- Victimology
- Visual sociology
- Social theory
- Social stratification
- Sociological theory
- Sociobiology
- Sociocybernetics
- Sociolinguistics

=== Interdisciplinary studies ===
==== Area studies ====
- African studies
- American studies (Pan-American Studies)
  - Appalachian studies
  - Canadian studies
  - Latin American studies
- Asian studies
  - Central Asian studies
  - East Asian studies
  - Iranian studies
  - Japanology (Japanese studies)
  - Korean studies
  - Sinology (outline) (Chinese studies)
  - Indology (South Asian studies)
    - Bengal studies
    - Dravidian studies (Dravidology)
      - Tamilology
    - Pakistan studies
    - Sindhology
  - Southeast Asian studies
- European studies
  - Celtic studies
  - German studies
  - Indo-European studies
  - Scandinavian studies
  - Slavic studies
- Australian studies
- Pacific studies
- Middle East studies
  - Turkology (Turkish studies)
- Russian and Eastern European studies

==== Ethnic and cultural studies ====
- Cultural studies
- Ethnic studies
- Ethnology
- Culturology
- Cross-cultural studies

==== Organizational studies ====
- Business administration
- Business economics
- Business studies
- Human resources management
- Industrial organization
- Management
- Organizational behavior
- Organization theory
- Project management
- Quality control

== Natural science ==
=== Physical Science ===
==== Space sciences ====
- Aerospace engineering
  - Aerospace architecture
  - Aerospace physiology
  - Aerospace manufacturing
  - Astronautics
    - Space architecture
    - Space colonization
    - Space commercialization
      - Space-based economy
      - Space industry
      - Space manufacturing
      - Space tourism
    - Space environment
    - Space logistics
    - Space food
    - Space medicine
      - Neuroscience in space
    - Space religion
    - Space sex
    - Space survival
    - Space warfare
    - Space writing
  - Aeronautics
  - Control engineering
  - Human spaceflight
  - Robotic spacecraft
  - Space corrosion
- Space technology
  - Space telescopes
  - Space-based radar
  - Space-based solar power
  - Spacecraft design
  - Spacecraft propulsion
- Asteroid-impact avoidance
- Astrobiology
- Astrobotany
- Astrochemistry
  - Theoretical astronomy
- Cosmochemistry
- Cosmology
  - Physical cosmology
- Micro-g environment research
- Remote sensing
- Space archaeology
- Space exploration
- Space law
- Space nuclear power

===== Astronomy =====
- Astronomy (outline)
  - Archaeoastronomy
  - Astrometry
  - Amateur astronomy
  - Forensic astronomy
  - Extragalactic astronomy
  - Galactic astronomy
  - High-energy astronomy
  - Observational astronomy
    - Radio astronomy
    - Microwave astronomy
    - Submillimetre astronomy
    - Infrared astronomy
    - Optical astronomy
    - UV astronomy
    - X-ray astronomy
    - Gamma-ray astronomy
    - Cosmic-ray astronomy
    - Neutrino astronomy
    - Gravitational wave astronomy
  - Photometry
  - Spectroscopy
  - Stellar astronomy
    - Solar astronomy
- Astrophysics (outline)
  - Celestial mechanics
  - Compact objects
  - Computational astrophysics
  - Gravitational astronomy
    - Black holes
  - Interstellar medium
  - Numerical simulations
    - Astrophysical plasma
    - Galaxy formation and evolution
    - High-energy astrophysics
    - Hydrodynamics
    - Magnetohydrodynamics
    - Star formation
  - Orbital mechanics
  - Physical cosmology
  - Relativistic astrophysics
  - Stellar astrophysics
    - Helioseismology
    - Solar physics
    - Stellar evolution
    - Stellar nucleosynthesis
  - Space plasma physics
- Planetary science (alternatively, a part of earth science)
  - Atmospheric science
  - Exoplanetology
  - Planetary formation
  - Planetary rings
  - Magnetospheres
  - Planetary geology
  - Planetary surfaces
  - Small Solar System bodies

==== Physics ====
- Acoustics (outline)
  - Quantum acoustics
- Agrophysics
- Aerodynamics
- Applied physics (outline)
  - Accelerator physics
  - Communication physics
- Astrophysics
- Atmospheric physics
- Atomic, molecular, and optical physics
- Atomic physics
- Biophysics (outline)
  - Neurophysics
- Chemical physics
- Classical physics
- Computational physics
- Condensed matter physics
- Cryogenics
- Digital physics
- Dynamics
  - Analytical dynamics
  - Astrodynamics
  - Brownian dynamics
  - File dynamics
  - Flight dynamics
  - Fluid dynamics
    - Aerodynamics
    - Hydrodynamics
  - Fractional dynamics
  - Geodynamics
  - Molecular dynamics
  - Newtonian dynamics
  - Langevin dynamics
  - Quantum chromodynamics
  - Quantum electrodynamics
  - Relativistic dynamics
  - Stellar dynamics
  - System dynamics
  - Thermodynamics
  - Vehicle dynamics
- Econophysics
- Electricity
- Electromagnetism
- Electrostatic
- Magnetism
- Engineering physics
- Elementary particle physics
- Experimental physics
- Fluid dynamics
- Geophysics (outline)
  - Biogeophysics
  - Geomagnetism
- Kinematics
  - Fluid kinematics
  - Relativistic kinematics
- Kinetics
  - Electrokinetics
  - Homeokinetics
- Laser physics
- Materials physics
- Mathematical physics
- Mechanics
  - Analytical mechanics
  - Applied mechanics
  - Ballistics
  - Biomechanics
  - Celestial mechanics
  - Classical mechanics
  - Continuum mechanics
  - Fluid mechanics
  - Fracture mechanics
  - Hamiltonian mechanics
  - Hydraulics
  - Lagrangian mechanics
  - Matrix mechanics
  - Molecular mechanics
  - Optomechanics
  - Particle mechanics
  - Quantum mechanics
  - Relativistic mechanics
  - Relativistic quantum mechanics
  - Soil mechanics
  - Solid mechanics
  - Statistical mechanics
    - Quantum statistical mechanics
- Mineral physics
- Medical physics
- Molecular physics
- Newtonian dynamics
- Nuclear physics
- Optics
  - Geometrical optics
  - Physical optics
  - Quantum optics
- Particle physics
- Petrophysics
- Photonics
- Physical chemistry
- Polymer physics
- Plasma physics
- Quantum physics
  - Quantum technology
- Radiophysics
- Relativity
  - General relativity
  - Special relativity
- Solid mechanics
- Solid state physics
- Statistical mechanics
- Theoretical physics
- Thermal physics
- Thermodynamics
- Social physics
- Soil physics
- Solid state physics
- Spintronics
- Statics
  - Fluid statics
- Statistical physics
- Surface physics

==== Chemistry ====
- Agrochemistry
- Analytical chemistry
- Astrochemistry
- Atmospheric chemistry
- Biochemistry (outline)
- Biogeochemistry
- Catalysts
- Chemical biology
- Chemical engineering (outline)
- Chemical physics
- Cheminformatics
- Computational chemistry
- Cosmochemistry
- Electrochemistry
- Environmental chemistry
- Femtochemistry
- Flavor
- Flow chemistry
- Forensic chemistry
- Geochemistry
- Green chemistry
- Histochemistry
- Hydrogenation
- Immunochemistry
- Inorganic chemistry
- Marine chemistry
- Mathematical chemistry
- Mechanochemistry
- Medicinal chemistry
- Molecular biology
- Molecular mechanics
- Nanotechnology
- Natural product chemistry
- Neurochemistry
- Nuclear chemistry
- Oenology
- Organic chemistry (outline)
- Organometallic chemistry
- Petrochemistry
- Pharmacology
- Photochemistry
- Physical chemistry
- Physical organic chemistry
- Phytochemistry
- Polymer chemistry
- Quantum chemistry
- Radiochemistry
- Soil chemistry
- Solid-state chemistry
- Sonochemistry
- Supramolecular chemistry
- Surface chemistry
- Synthetic chemistry
- Systems chemistry
- Theoretical chemistry
- Thermochemistry

==== Earth science ====
- Chronology
- Edaphology
- Environmental chemistry
- Environmental science
- Gemology
- Geochemistry
- Geodesy
- Physical geography (outline)
  - Atmospheric science / Meteorology (outline)
  - Biogeography / Phytogeography
  - Climatology / Paleoclimatology / Palaeogeography
  - Coastal geography / Oceanography
  - Edaphology / Pedology or Soil science
  - Geobiology
  - Geology (outline) (Geomorphology, Mineralogy, Petrology, Sedimentology, Speleology, Tectonics, Volcanology)
  - Geostatistics
  - Glaciology
  - Hydrology (outline)/ Limnology / Hydrogeology
  - Landscape ecology
  - Quaternary science
- Geophysics (outline)
- Paleontology
  - Paleobiology
  - Paleoecology
  - Forensic geology
- Geophysics (outline)
- Planetary science (alternatively, a part of space science)
- Seismology

=== Life science ===
==== Biology ====
- Aerobiology
- Anatomy
  - Comparative anatomy
  - Human anatomy (outline)
- Biochemistry (outline)
- Bioinformatics
- Biophysics (outline)
- Biotechnology (outline)
- Botany (outline)
  - Ethnobotany
  - Phycology
- Cell biology (outline)
- Chemical biology
- Chronobiology
- Cognitive biology
- Computational biology
- Conservation biology
  - Fisheries management
  - Wildlife management
  - Wildlife observation
- Cryobiology
- Developmental biology
  - Embryology
  - Gerontology
  - Teratology
- Ecology (outline)
  - Agroecology
  - Ethnoecology
  - Human ecology
  - Landscape ecology
  - Recreation ecology
- Endocrinology
- Epigenetics
- Ethnobiology
  - Anthrozoology
- Evolutionary biology
- Evolution (outline)
  - Systematics
  - Taxonomy
- Forensic biology
- Genetics (outline)
  - Behavioural genetics
  - Molecular genetics
  - Population genetics
- Geobiology
- Histology
- Human biology
- Immunology (outline)
- Limnology
- Linnaean taxonomy
- Marine biology
- Mathematical biology
- Microbiology
  - Bacteriology
  - Protistology
- Molecular biology
- Mycology
- Neuroscience (outline)
  - Behavioral neuroscience
  - Neurophysics
  - Computational Neuroscience
- Nutrition (outline)
- Paleobiology
  - Paleontology
- Parasitology
- Pathology
  - Anatomical pathology
  - Clinical pathology
  - Dermatopathology
  - Forensic pathology
  - Hematopathology
  - Histopathology
  - Molecular pathology
  - Surgical pathology
  - Phytopathology
- Physiology
  - Human physiology
    - Exercise physiology
- Structural Biology
- Systematics (Taxonomy)
- Population biology
- Quantum biology
- Sociobiology
- Theoretical biology
- Toxicology
- Systems biology
- Virology
  - Molecular virology
- Xenobiology
- Zoology (outline)
  - Animal communications
  - Apiology
  - Arachnology
  - Arthropodology
  - Batrachology
  - Bryozoology
  - Carcinology
  - Cetology
  - Cnidariology
  - Entomology
    - Forensic entomology
  - Ethnozoology
  - Ethology
  - Helminthology
  - Herpetology
  - Ichthyology (outline)
  - Invertebrate zoology
  - Mammalogy
    - Cynology
    - Felinology
  - Malacology
    - Conchology
    - Limacology
    - Teuthology
  - Myriapodology
  - Myrmecology (outline)
  - Nematology
  - Neuroethology
  - Oology
  - Ornithology (outline)
  - Planktology
  - Primatology
  - Zootomy
  - Zoosemiotics

== Formal science ==
=== Computer science ===
Also a branch of electrical engineering

- Logic in computer science
  - Formal methods (Formal verification)
  - Logic programming
  - Multi-valued logic
    - Fuzzy logic
  - Programming language semantics
  - Type theory
- Operating systems
- Algorithms
  - Computational geometry
  - Distributed algorithms
  - Parallel algorithms
  - Randomized algorithms
- Artificial intelligence (outline)
  - Cognitive science
    - Automated reasoning
    - Computer vision (outline)
    - Machine learning
      - Artificial neural networks
      - Support vector machine
    - Natural language processing (Computational linguistics)
    - Computer vision (outline)
  - Expert systems
  - Robotics (outline)
- Database
- Data science
- Data structures
- Computer architecture
- Computer graphics
  - Image processing
  - Scientific visualization
- Computer communications (networks)
  - Cloud computing
  - Information theory
  - Internet, World Wide Web
  - Ubiquitous computing
  - Wireless computing (Mobile computing)
- Computer security and reliability
  - Cryptanalysis
  - Cryptography
  - Fault-tolerant computing
  - Information security
  - Network security
- Computing in mathematics, natural sciences, engineering, and medicine
  - Algebraic (symbolic) computation
  - Computational biology (bioinformatics)
  - Computational chemistry
  - Computational mathematics
  - Computational neuroscience
  - Computational number theory
  - Computational physics
  - Computer-aided engineering
    - Computational fluid dynamics
    - Finite element analysis
  - Numerical analysis
  - Algebraic (symbolic) computation
  - Scientific computing (Computational science)
- Computing in social sciences, arts, humanities, and professions
  - Community informatics
  - Computational economics
  - Computational finance
  - Computational sociology
  - Digital humanities (Humanities computing)
  - History of computer hardware
  - History of computer science (outline)
  - Humanistic informatics
  - Databases (outline)
    - Distributed databases
    - Object databases
    - Relational databases
  - Data management
  - Data mining
  - Information science (outline)
  - Information architecture
  - Information management
  - Information retrieval
  - Information system
  - Information technology
  - Knowledge management
  - Multimedia, hypermedia
    - Sound and music computing
- Distributed computing
  - Grid computing
- Human-computer interaction
- Parallel computing
  - High-performance computing
- Computer program
- Computer programming
- Programming languages
  - Compilers
  - Programming paradigms
    - Concurrent programming
    - Functional programming
    - Imperative programming
    - Logic programming
    - Object-oriented programming
  - Program semantics
  - Type theory
- Quantum computing
  - Quantum information
- Software engineering
  - Formal methods (Formal verification)
  - Game Development
- Theoretical computer science
- Theory of computation
  - Automata theory (Formal languages)
  - Computability theory
  - Computational complexity theory
  - Concurrency theory
- VLSI design

=== Logic ===
- Mathematical logic
  - Set theory
  - Proof theory
  - Model theory
  - Recursion theory
  - Modal logic
  - Intuitionistic logic
- Philosophical logic
  - Logical reasoning
  - Modal logic
    - Deontic logic
    - Doxastic logic
- Logic in computer science
  - Programming language semantics
  - Formal methods (Formal verification)
  - Type theory
  - Logic programming
  - Multi-valued logic
    - Fuzzy logic

=== Mathematics ===
==== Pure mathematics ====
- Mathematical logic and Foundations of mathematics
  - Intuitionistic logic
  - Modal logic
  - Model theory
  - Proof theory
  - Recursion theory
  - Set theory
- Arithmetic
- Algebra (outline)
  - Associative algebra
  - Category theory
    - Topos theory
  - Differential algebra
  - Field theory
  - Group theory
    - Group representation
  - Homological algebra
  - K-theory
  - Lattice theory (Order theory)
  - Lie algebra
  - Linear algebra (Vector space)
  - Multilinear algebra
  - Non-associative algebra
  - Representation theory
  - Ring theory
    - Commutative algebra
    - Noncommutative algebra
  - Universal algebra
- Analysis
  - Complex analysis
  - Functional analysis
    - Operator theory
  - Harmonic analysis
    - Fourier analysis
  - Non-standard analysis
  - Ordinary differential equations
  - p-adic analysis
  - Partial differential equations
  - Real analysis
    - Calculus (outline)
- Probability theory
  - Ergodic theory
  - Measure theory
    - Integral geometry
  - Stochastic process
- Geometry (outline) and Topology
  - Affine geometry
  - Algebraic geometry
  - Algebraic topology
  - Convex geometry
  - Differential topology
  - Discrete geometry
  - Finite geometry
  - Galois geometry
  - General topology
  - Geometric topology
  - Integral geometry
  - Noncommutative geometry
  - Non-Euclidean geometry
  - Projective geometry
  - Euclidean geometry
  - Solid geometry
  - Trigonometry
- Number theory
  - Algebraic number theory
  - Analytic number theory
  - Arithmetic combinatorics
  - Arithmetic
  - Geometric number theory

==== Applied mathematics ====
- Approximation theory
- Combinatorics (outline)
  - Coding theory
- Dynamical systems
  - Chaos theory
  - Fractal geometry
- Game theory
- Graph theory
- Information theory
- Mathematical physics
  - Quantum field theory
  - Quantum gravity
    - String theory
  - Quantum mechanics
  - Statistical mechanics
- Numerical analysis
- Operations research
  - Assignment problem
  - Decision analysis
  - Dynamic programming
  - Inventory theory
  - Linear programming
  - Mathematical optimization
  - Optimal maintenance
  - Real options analysis
  - Scheduling
  - Stochastic processes
  - Systems analysis
- Statistics (outline)
  - Actuarial science
  - Demography
  - Econometrics
  - Mathematical statistics
  - Data visualization
- Computational mathematics
- Theory of computation
  - Computational complexity theory
- Cryptography
- Steganography
- Mathematical game
- Mathematical puzzle

===== Statistics =====
- Mathematical statistics
- Econometrics
- Actuarial science
- Demography
- Computational statistics
  - Data mining
  - Regression (outline)
  - Simulation
    - Bootstrap (statistics)
- Design of experiments
  - Block design and Analysis of variance
  - Response surface methodology
- Sample Survey
  - Sampling theory
- Statistical modelling
  - Biostatistics
    - Epidemiology
  - Multivariate analysis
    - Structural equation model
    - Time series
  - Reliability theory
  - Quality control
- Statistical theory
  - Decision theory
  - Mathematical statistics
    - Probability (outline)
  - Survey methodology

== Applied science ==
=== Agriculture ===
- Aeroponics
  - Fogponics
- Agroecology
- Agrology
- Agronomy
- Animal husbandry (Animal science)
  - Beekeeping (Apiculture)
- Anthroponics
- Agricultural economics
- Agricultural engineering
  - Biological systems engineering
  - Food engineering
- Aquaculture
- Aquaponics
- Enology
- Entomology
- Food science
  - Culinary arts
- Forestry
- Horticulture
- Hydrology (outline)
- Hydroponics
- Pedology
- Plant science (outline)
  - Pomology
- Pest control
- Purification
- Urban agriculture
- Viticulture

=== Architecture and design ===
- Architecture (outline)
  - Interior architecture
  - Landscape architecture
- Architectural analytics
- Historic preservation
- Interior design (interior architecture)
- Landscape architecture (landscape planning)
- Landscape design
- Urban planning (urban design)
- Visual communication
  - Graphic design
    - Type design
  - Technical drawing
- Industrial design (product design)
  - Ergonomics (outline)
  - Toy and amusement design
- User experience design
  - Interaction design
  - Information architecture
  - User interface design
  - User experience evaluation
- Decorative arts
- Fashion design
- Textile design
- Food design

=== Education ===
- Comparative education
- Critical pedagogy
- Curriculum and instruction
  - Alternative education
  - Early childhood education
  - Elementary education
  - Secondary education
  - Higher education
  - Mastery learning
  - Cooperative learning
  - Agricultural education
  - Art education
  - Bilingual education
  - Chemistry education
  - Counselor education
  - Language education
  - Legal education
  - Mathematics education
  - Medical education
  - Military education and training
  - Music education
  - Nursing education
  - Outdoor education
  - Peace education
  - Physical education/Sports coaching
  - Physics education
  - Reading education
  - Religious education
  - Science education
  - Special education
  - Sex education
  - Sociology of education
  - Technology education
  - Vocational education
- Educational leadership
- Educational philosophy
- Educational psychology
- Educational technology
- Distance education

=== Engineering and technology ===
==== Chemical engineering ====
- Biocatalysts
- Bioengineering
  - Biochemical engineering
  - Biomolecular engineering
  - Bionics
- Catalysis
- Materials engineering
- Molecular engineering
- Nanotechnology
- Polymer engineering
- Process design
  - Petroleum engineering
  - Nuclear engineering
  - Food engineering
- Process engineering
- Reaction engineering
- Thermodynamics
- Transport phenomena

==== Civil engineering ====
- Coastal engineering
- Earthquake engineering
- Ecological engineering
- Environmental engineering
- Geotechnical engineering
  - Engineering geology
- Hydraulic engineering
- Mining engineering
- Transportation engineering
  - Highway engineering
- Structural engineering
  - Architectural engineering
- Structural mechanics
- Surveying
- Agricultural engineering
- Construction
- Infrastructure

==== Educational technology ====
- Instructional design
  - Distance education
  - Instructional simulation
- Human performance technology
- Knowledge management

==== Electrical engineering ====
- Applied physics
- Computer engineering (outline)
- Computer science
- Control systems engineering
  - Control theory
- Electronic engineering
  - Electronics
  - Instrumentation engineering
- Engineering physics
  - Photonics
- Information theory
- Mechatronics
- Power engineering
- Quantum computing
- Robotics (outline)
  - Microbotics
- Semiconductors
- Telecommunications engineering

==== Materials science ====
- Biomaterials
- Ceramic engineering
- Crystallography
- Nanomaterials
- Photonics
- Physical Metallurgy
- Polymer engineering
- Polymer science
- Semiconductors
- Corrosion engineering

==== Mechanical engineering ====
- Aerospace engineering
  - Aeronautics
  - Astronautics
- Acoustical engineering
- Automotive engineering
- Biomedical engineering
  - Biomechanical engineering
  - Neural engineering
- Continuum mechanics
- Fluid mechanics
- Heat transfer
- Industrial engineering
- Manufacturing engineering
- Marine engineering
- Mass transfer
- Mechatronics
- Nanoengineering
- Ocean engineering
- Optical engineering
- Robotics
- Thermal engineering
- Thermodynamics

==== Systems science ====
- Chaos theory
- Complex systems
- Conceptual systems
- Control theory
  - Affect control theory
  - Control engineering
  - Control systems
  - Dynamical systems
  - Perceptual control theory
- Cybernetics
  - Biocybernetics
  - Engineering cybernetics
  - Management cybernetics
  - Medical cybernetics
  - New Cybernetics
  - Second-order cybernetics
  - Sociocybernetics
- Network science
- Operations research
- Systems biology
  - Computational systems biology
  - Synthetic biology
  - Systems immunology
  - Systems neuroscience
- System dynamics
  - Social dynamics
- Systems ecology
  - Ecosystem ecology
- Systems engineering
  - Biological systems engineering
  - Earth systems engineering and management
  - Enterprise systems engineering
  - Systems analysis
- Systems psychology
  - Ergonomics
  - Family systems theory
  - Systemic therapy
- Systems theory
  - Biochemical systems theory
  - Ecological systems theory
  - Developmental systems theory
  - General systems theory
  - Living systems theory
  - LTI system theory
  - Mathematical system theory
  - Sociotechnical systems theory
  - World-systems theory
- Systems theory in anthropology

=== Environmental studies and forestry ===
- Ecology
  - Recreation ecology
- Environmental management
  - Coastal management
  - Fisheries management
  - Land management
  - Natural resource management
  - Waste management
  - Wildlife management
- Environmental policy
- Wildlife observation
- Silviculture
- Sustainability studies
  - Sustainable development

=== Family and consumer science ===
- Consumer education
- Housing
- Interior design
- Nutrition (outline)
  - Foodservice management
- Textiles

=== Human physical performance and recreation ===
- Biomechanics / Sports biomechanics
- Sports coaching
- Escapology
- Ergonomics
- Physical fitness
  - Aerobics
  - Personal trainer / Personal fitness training
- Game design
- Exercise physiology
- Kinesiology / Exercise physiology / Performance science
- Leisure studies
- Navigation
- Outdoor activity
- Physical activity
- Physical education / Pedagogy
- Sociology of sport
- Sexology
- Sports / exercise
- Sports journalism / sportscasting
- Sport management
  - Athletic director
- Sport psychology
- Sports medicine
  - Athletic training
- Survival skills
  - Batoning
  - Bushcraft
  - Scoutcraft
  - Woodcraft
- Toy and amusement design

=== Journalism, media studies and communication ===
- Journalism (outline)
  - Broadcast journalism
  - Digital journalism
  - Literary journalism
  - New media journalism
  - Print journalism
  - Sports journalism / sportscasting
- Media studies (Mass media)
  - Newspaper
  - Magazine
  - Radio (outline)
  - Television (outline)
    - Television studies
  - Film (outline)
    - Film studies
  - Game studies
  - Fan studies
- Narratology
  - Internet (outline)
- Communication studies
  - Advertising
  - Animal communication
  - Communication design
  - Conspiracy theory
  - Digital media
  - Electronic media
  - Environmental communication
  - Hoax
  - Information theory
  - Intercultural communication
  - Marketing (outline)
  - Mass communication
  - Nonverbal communication
  - Organizational communication
  - Popular culture studies
  - Propaganda
  - Public relations (outline)
  - Speech communication
  - Technical writing
  - Translation

=== Library and museum studies ===
- Archival science
- Archivist
- Bibliographic databases
- Bibliometrics
- Bookmobile
- Cataloging
  - Citation analysis
- Categorization
- Classification
  - Library classification
  - Taxonomic classification
  - Scientific classification
  - Statistical classification
  - Security classification
  - Film classification
- Collections care
- Collection management
- Collection Management Policy
- Conservation science
- Conservation and restoration of cultural heritage
- Curator
- Data storage
- Database management
- Data modeling
- Digital preservation
- Dissemination
- Film preservation
- Five laws of library science
- Historic preservation
- History of library science
- Human-computer interaction
- Indexer
- Informatics
- Information architecture
- Information broker
- Information literacy
- Information retrieval
- Information science (outline)
- Information systems and technology
- Integrated library system
- Interlibrary loan
- Knowledge engineering
- Knowledge management
- Library
- Library binding
- Library circulation
- Library instruction
- Library portal
- Library technical services
- Management
- Mass deacidification
- Museology
- Museum education
  - Museum administration
- Object conservation
- Preservation
- Prospect research
- Readers' advisory
- Records management
- Reference
- Reference desk
- Reference management software
- Registrar
- Research methods
- Slow fire
- Special library
- Statistics

=== Medicine and health ===
- Alternative medicine
- Audiology
- Clinical laboratory sciences/Clinical pathology/Laboratory medicine
  - Clinical biochemistry
  - Cytogenetics
  - Cytohematology
  - Cytology (outline)
  - Haemostasiology
  - Histology
  - Clinical immunology
  - Clinical microbiology
  - Molecular genetics
  - Parasitology
- Clinical physiology
- Deathcare
  - Funeral director
  - Mortuary science
- Dentistry (outline)
  - Dental hygiene and epidemiology
  - Dental surgery
  - Endodontics
  - Implantology
  - Oral and maxillofacial surgery
  - Orthodontics
  - Periodontics
  - Prosthodontics
- Dermatology
- Emergency medicine (outline)
- Epidemiology
  - Mathematical modelling of infectious diseases
- Geriatrics
- Global Health
- Gynaecology
- Health informatics/Clinical informatics
- Hematology
- Holistic medicine
- Infectious disease
- Intensive care medicine
- Internal medicine
  - Cardiology
    - Cardiac electrophysiology
    - Interventional Cardiology
  - Endocrinology
  - Gastroenterology
  - Hepatology
  - Nephrology
  - Neurology
  - Oncology
  - Pulmonology
  - Rheumatology
- International Health
- Medical toxicology
- Music therapy
- Nursing
- Nutrition (outline) and dietetics
- Obstetrics (outline)
- Occupational hygiene
- Occupational therapy
- Occupational toxicology
- Ophthalmology
  - Neuro-ophthalmology
- Optometry
- Otolaryngology
- Pathology
- Pediatrics
- Pharmaceutical sciences
  - Pharmaceutical chemistry
  - Pharmaceutical toxicology
  - Pharmaceutics
  - Pharmacocybernetics
  - Pharmacodynamics
  - Pharmacogenomics
  - Pharmacognosy
  - Pharmacokinetics
  - Pharmacology
  - Pharmacy
- Physical fitness
  - Group Fitness / aerobics
  - Kinesiology / Exercise physiology / Performance science
  - Personal fitness training
- Physical therapy
- Osteopathy
- Physiotherapy
- Podiatry
- Population health
- Preventive medicine
- Primary care
  - General practice
- Psychiatry (outline)
  - Forensic psychiatry
- Psychosomatic
- Psychotherapy
- Psychology (outline)
- Therapy
- Public health
- Radiology
- Recreational therapy
- Rehabilitation medicine
- Respiratory therapy
- Sleep medicine
- Speech–language pathology
- Sports medicine
- Surgery
  - Bariatric surgery
  - Cardiothoracic surgery
  - Neurosurgery
  - Orthoptics
  - Orthopedic surgery
  - Plastic surgery
  - Trauma surgery
  - Traumatology
  - Anesthesiology
- Traditional medicine
- Tropical medicine
- Urology
  - Andrology
- Veterinary medicine
- Cosmetology
- Cleaning
- Decontamination
- Sterilization (microbiology)
- Sports medicine

=== Military sciences ===
- Amphibious warfare
- Artillery
- Battlespace
  - Air
  - Information
  - Land
  - Sea
  - Space
- Campaigning
- Military engineering
- Doctrine
- Espionage
- Game theory
- Grand strategy
  - Containment
  - Limited war
  - Military science (outline)
  - Philosophy of war
  - Strategic studies
  - Chess
  - Total war
  - War (outline)
- Leadership
- Logistics
  - Materiel
  - Supply chain management
- Military operation
- Military history
  - Prehistoric
  - Ancient
  - Medieval
  - Early modern
  - Industrial
  - Modern
  - Fourth-generation warfare
- Military intelligence
- Military law
- Military medicine
- Naval science
  - Naval engineering
  - Naval tactics
  - Naval architecture
- Organization
  - Command and control
  - Doctrine
  - Education and training
  - Engineers
  - Intelligence
  - Ranks
  - Staff
  - Technology and equipment
  - Military exercises
  - Military simulation
  - Military sports
- Strategy
  - Attrition
  - Deception
  - Defensive
  - Offensive
  - Counter-offensive
  - Maneuver
  - Goal
  - Naval
- Tactics
  - Aerial
  - Battle
  - Cavalry
  - Charge
  - Counter-attack
  - Counter-insurgency
  - Counter-intelligence
  - Counter-terrorism
  - Foxhole
  - Endemic warfare
  - Guerrilla warfare
  - Infiltration
  - Irregular warfare
  - Morale
  - Naval tactics
  - Siege
  - Surgical strike
  - Tactical objective
  - Trench warfare
- Military weapons
  - Armor
  - Artillery
  - Biological
  - Cavalry
  - Conventional
  - Chemical
  - Cyber
  - Economic
  - Electronic
  - Infantry
  - Nuclear
  - Psychological
  - Unconventional
- Other Military
  - Arms control
  - Arms race
  - Assassination
  - Asymmetric warfare
  - Civil defense
  - Clandestine operation
  - Collateral damage
  - Cold war (general term)
  - Combat
  - Covert operation
  - Cyberwarfare
  - Defense industry
  - Disarmament
  - Intelligence agency
  - Laws of war
  - Mercenary
  - Military campaign
  - Military operation
  - Mock combat
  - Network-centric warfare
  - Paramilitary
  - Principles of war
  - Private defense agency
  - Private military company
  - Proxy war
  - Religious war
  - Security
  - Special forces
  - Special operations
  - Theater (warfare)
  - Theft
  - Undercover
  - War crimes
  - Warrior

=== Public administration ===
- Civil service
- Corrections
- Conservation biology
- Criminal justice (outline)
- Disaster research
- Disaster response
- Emergency management
- Emergency services
- Fire safety (Structural fire protection)
- Fire ecology (Wildland fire management)
- Governmental affairs
- International affairs
- Law enforcement
- Peace and conflict studies
- Police science
- Policy studies
  - Policy analysis
- Public administration
  - Nonprofit administration
  - Non-governmental organization (NGO) administration
  - Public policy doctrine
  - Public policy school
  - Regulation
- Public safety
- Public service

=== Public policy ===
- Agricultural policy
- Commercial policy
- Cultural policy
- Domestic policy
- Drug policy
  - Drug policy reform
- Economic policy
  - Fiscal policy
  - Incomes policy
  - Industrial policy
  - Investment policy
  - Monetary policy
  - Tax policy
- Education policy
- Energy policy
  - Nuclear energy policy
  - Renewable energy policy
- Environmental policy
- Food policy
- Foreign policy
- Governance
- Health policy
  - Pharmaceutical policy
  - Vaccination policy
- Housing policy
- Immigration policy
- Knowledge policy
- Language policy
- Military policy
- Science policy
  - Climate change policy
  - Stem cell research policy
  - Space policy
  - Technology policy
- Security policy
- Social policy
- Public policy by country

=== Social work ===
- Child welfare
- Community practice
  - Community organizing
  - Social policy
- Human Services
- Corrections
- Gerontology
- Medical social work
- Mental health
- School social work

=== Transportation ===
- Highway safety
- Infographics
- Intermodal transportation studies
- Logistics
- Marine transportation
  - Port management
  - Seafaring
- Operations research
- Mass transit
- Travel
- Vehicles

== See also ==
- Academia (outline)
- Branches of science (outline)
- Classification of Instructional Programs
- Joint Academic Coding System
- List of fields of doctoral studies in the United States
- Lists of occupations
- Art school
- Academic genealogy
- Curriculum
- Interdisciplinarity
- Knowledge organization
- Transdisciplinarity
- Classification of Instructional Programs
