= Administrative history =

Administrative history is a historiographic field which looks at the history of state administrations and bureaucracies. Originally considered a sub-field of Administrative Sciences that was intended to improve contemporary governance, administrative history has become an increasingly separate field. Administrative historians study the changes in administrative ideologies and administrative law while also looking at civil servants and the relationship between government and society. It is related to political and constitutional history. The discipline is most common in France, Germany, the United Kingdom, and Italy. In 1965, when fields like social history were becoming ever more popular, G. R. Elton (then a fellow of Clare College, Cambridge) defended administrative history as the only field which can explain how the machinery of government actually worked in the past.

== Journals ==
Academic journals which specialise in administrative history include:

- Jahrbuch für europäische Verwaltungsgeschichte (JEV)

== The New Administrative History ==
Historians researching the medieval and early modern periods have begun to reexplore the possibilities of administrative history. This movement has been described as the "New Administrative History". It embraces a broad range of approaches, including interdisciplinary and theoretical work – as exemplified by John Sabapathy – and also more traditional institutional approaches, revisiting the methods of influential administrative historians such as T. F. Tout and G. R. Elton.

== See also ==
- Business history
- Institutional anthropology
- Prosopography
- Constitutional history
