= Joint Academic Coding System =

UK academic subjects vocabulary

The Joint Academic Coding System (JACS) system was used by the Higher Education Statistics Agency (HESA) and the Universities and Colleges Admissions Service (UCAS) in the United Kingdom to classify academic subjects. It was replaced by the Higher Education Classification of Subjects (HECoS) and the Common Aggregation Hierarchy (CAH) for the 2019/20 academic year.

A JACS code for a single subject consists of a letter and three numbers. The letter represents the broad subject classification, e.g. F for physical sciences. The first number represents the principal subject area, e.g. F3 for physics, and subsequent numbers represent further details, similar to the Dewey Decimal System. The principal subject of physics, for example, is broken into 19 detailed subjects, represented by a letter plus three numbers: e.g., F300 represents physics, F330 environmental physics, and F331 atmospheric physics.

== History ==
HESA and UCAS used to operate two different (though similar) subject coding systems - HESAcode and Standard Classification of Academic Subjects (SCAS) respectively. In 1996 a joint project was launched to bring these two systems together to create a unified structure. A project team was established with two people from each of the two organizations. The project team became known as JACS since this was an acronym of their names (Jonathan Waller and Andy Youell from HESA, Clive Sillence and Sara Goodwins from UCAS).

The first operational version (v1.7) of the Joint Academic Coding System (retaining the JACS acronym) was published in 1999 and became operational in UCAS and HESA systems for the year 2002/03.

An update exercise took place in 2005 and JACS 2 was introduced for the academic year 2007/08. JACS 3 was introduced for the 2012/13 year.

== Codes ==
The letter codes assigned to the subject areas and the letter + number codes assigned to the principal subjects in JACS 3 are:

Letter	Subject area	Principal subjects
A	(1) Medicine and dentistry	A0 Broadly-based programmes within Medicine and dentistry A1 Pre-clinical medicine A2 Pre-clinical dentistry A3 Clinical medicine A4 Clinical dentistry A9 Others in medicine and dentistry
B	(2) Subjects allied to medicine	B0 Broadly-based programmes within subjects allied to medicine B1 Anatomy, physiology and pathology B2 Pharmacology, toxicology and pharmacy B3 Complementary medicines, therapies and well-being B4 Nutrition; B5 Ophthalmics; B6 Aural and oral sciences B7 Nursing; B8 Medical Technology; B9 Others in subjects allied to medicine
C	(3) Biological sciences	C0 Broadly-based programmes within biological sciences C1 Biology; C2 Botany; C3 Zoology; C4 Genetics; C5 Microbiology; C6 Sports and exercise science C7 Molecular biology, biophysics and biochemistry C8 Psychology; C9 Others in biological sciences
D	(4) Veterinary science	D1 Pre-clinical veterinary medicine D2 Clinical veterinary medicine and dentistry
D	(5) Agriculture and related subjects	D0 Broadly-based programmes within agriculture and related subjects D3 Animal science D4 Agriculture; D5 Forestry and arboriculture D6 Food and beverage studies D7 Agricultural sciences D9 Others in veterinary sciences, agriculture and related subjects
F	(6) Physical sciences	F0 Broadly-based programmes within physical sciences F1 Chemistry; F2 Materials science F3 Physics; F4 Forensic and Archaeological sciences F5 Astronomy; F6 Geology; F7 Science of aquatic and terrestrial environments F8 Physical geographical sciences F9 Others in physical sciences
G	(7) Mathematical sciences	G1 Mathematics; G2 Operational research G3 Statistics; G9 Others in mathematical sciences
I	(8) Computer science	I1 Computer science I2 Information systems I3 Software engineering I4 Artificial intelligence I5 Health informatics I6 Games; I7 Computer generated visual and audio effects I9 Others in computer science
H & J	(9) Engineering and Technology	H0 Broadly-based programmes within engineering and technology H1 General engineering H2 Civil engineering H3 Mechanical engineering H4 Aerospace engineering H5 Naval architecture H6 Electronic and electronic engineering H7 Production and manufacturing engineering H8 Chemical, process and energy engineering J1 Minerals technology J2 Metallurgy; J3 Ceramics and glass J4 Polymers and textiles J5 Materials technology not otherwise specified J6 Maritime technology J7 Biotechnology; J9 Others in technology
K	(A) Architecture, building and planning	K0 Broadly-based programmes within architecture, building and planning K1 Architecture; K2 Building; K3 Landscape and garden design K4 Planning (urban, rural and regional); K9 Others in architecture, building and planning
L	(B) Social studies	L0 Broadly-based programmes within social studies L1 Economics; L2 Politics; L3 Sociology; L4 Social policy L5 Social work L6 Anthropology; L7 Human and social geography L8 Development studies L9 Others in social studies
M	(C) Law	M0 Broadly-based programmes within law M1 Law by area M2 Law by topic M9 Others in law
N	(D) Business and administrative studies	N0 Broadly-based programmes within business and administrative studies N1 Business studies N2 Management studies N3 Finance; N4 Accounting; N5 Marketing; N6 Human resource management N7 Office skills N8 Hospitality, leisure, sport, tourism and transport N9 Others in business and administrative studies
P	(E) Mass communications and documentation	P0 Broadly-based programmes within mass communications and documentation P1 Information services P2 Publicity studies P3 Media studies P4 Publishing; P5 Journalism; P9 Others in mass communications and documentation
Q, R & T	(F) Languages	Q0 Broadly-based programmes within languages Q1 Linguistics; Q2 Comparative literary studies Q3 English studies Q4 Ancient language studies Q5 Celtic studies Q6 Latin studies Q7 Classical Greek studies Q8 Classical studies Q9 Others in linguistics, classics and related subjects R1 French studies R2 German studies R3 Italian studies R4 Spanish studies R5 Portuguese studies R6 Scandinavian studies R7 Russian and East European studies R8 European studies R9 Others in European languages, literature and related subjects T1 Chinese studies T2 Japanese studies T3 South Asian studies T4 Other Asian studies T5 African studies T6 Modern Middle Eastern studies T7 American studies T8 Australasian studies T9 Others in Eastern, Asiatic, African, American and Australasian languages, literature and related subjects
V	(G) Historical and philosophical studies	V0 Broadly-based programmes within historical & philosophical studies V1 History by period V2 History by area V3 History by topic V4 Archaeology; V5 Philosophy; V6 Theology and religious studies V7 Heritage studies V9 Others in historical and philosophical studies
W	(H) Creative arts and design	W0 Broadly-based programmes within creative arts and design W1 Fine art W2 Design studies W3 Music; W4 Drama; W5 Dance; W6 Cinematics and photography W7 Crafts; W8 Imaginative writing W9 Others in creative arts and design
X	(I) Education	X0 Broadly-based programmes within education X1 Training teachers X2 Research and study skills in education X3 Academic studies in education X9 Others in education
Y	(J) Combined	Y0 Combined

Y codes (combined studies) are only used at the Course level in the HESA database and are not used to describe individual modules.

== JACS Codes in the UCAS system ==
Course codes in the UCAS system are assigned by course providers and do not necessarily correspond to the JACS codes of the course subject. UCAS course codes are four characters in length but, unlike JACS codes, may consist of any combination of letters and numbers in any order. However, historically UCAS created course codes from the JACS subject code, and many institutions continue to do this, which can lead to confusion between the two concepts.

Where a course involves more than one subject, UCAS historically created the course code based on an aggregation of the JACS codes. For courses that are split 50:50 between two subjects, a code with two letters and two numbers is used, which combines the principal subject codes that would be used for the two subjects if studied as individual degrees.

=== Example ===
Consider the BSc course Mathematics and Physics:

- The principal subject code for Mathematics was G1, and the principal subject code for Physics is F3.
- The combined codes used were GF13 and FG31.
- The codes GFD3, GF1H and GFH1 were also used.

Another example was Music and Philosophy. The principal subject codes were W3 (Music) and V5 (Philosophy). The combined codes used are WV35 or VW35, while WV53, was also used.

The same letter could be used twice (if the two subjects were within the same general subject area), such as FF53 for Astronomy and Physics.

=== Courses with major/minor subjects ===
Coding was done differently for courses such as "Mathematics with Physics", which is not the same as "Mathematics and Physics".

The format for such courses was Y1Z9 where:

- Y1 is the "major" subject which represents most of the degree course
- Z9 is the "minor" subject which represents less of the course.

For example, Mathematics with Physics would be represented by G1F3, but Physics with Mathematics would be represented by F3G1. Hence the order in which the two subjects are notated was important historically.

== See also ==
- List of fields of doctoral studies
