= Ethnomuseology =

Branch of academic study

Ethnomuseology is the study of museums and museum curation in the context of the culture and cultural traditions of its collections. It is an interdisciplinary field combining museum studies, anthropology, ethnography, and often various fine arts.

== Overview ==
As stated by Moira Simpson, "Ethnomuseology is the field of scholarship concerning culturally appropriate museum curation and conservation of ethnographic materials using methods that reflect social, cultural, spiritual, or religious aspects of objects." A museum subscribing the principles of ethnomuseology will often maintain and present artifacts and collections in the traditional manner of their ethnological origins, combining the museum with the rituals and community of its theme. This can be in addition to conventional Western museum practices, which often focuses on object materiality. As well, ethnomuseology often involves a continued dialog between museum administrators and members of represented cultures in collections. The Encyclopedia of Global Archaeology considers ethnomuseology to be a "more holistic" approach to heritage interpretation.

== History ==
The term "ethnomuseology" is first seen in Romania and Czechoslovakia in the 1980s, where it described the use of artifacts from rural life to "[provide] evidence of authentic forms of culture". A variant, "etnomuseologia", was used in 1994 by the Romanian anthropologist Bert G. Ribeiro to describe the work of the Museu Paraense Emílio Goeldi in Belem, Brazil. In Belem, curators had been working directly with Amazonian Indians in a continued dialogue to create exhibits informed by the very culture they documented.

Today, a number of museums are considered to be followers the ethnomuseological method, including the National Museum of the American Indian at the Smithsonian Institution, the Alutiiq Museum in Kodiak, Alaska, and the Department of Ethnology at the Museum of Macedonia in Skopje, Macedonia. Since 2008, Masaryk University in Brno, Czech Republic has offered a course in ethnomuseology titled "MUII165 Practice in museology and ethnography".

== See also ==
- Museology
- Ethnography
- Ethnohistory
- Anthropology of institutions
