= Sociocybernetics =

Research field

Sociocybernetics is an interdisciplinary science between sociology and general systems theory and cybernetics. The International Sociological Association has a specialist research committee in the area – RC51 – which publishes the (electronic) Journal of Sociocybernetics.

The term "socio" in the name of sociocybernetics refers to any social system (as defined, among others, by Talcott Parsons and Niklas Luhmann).

Sociocybernetics aims to generate a general theoretical framework for understanding cooperative behavior in the context of a theory of evolution.

Sociocybernetics claims to include both what are called first order cybernetics and second order cybernetics. Cybernetics, according to Wiener's definition, is the science of "control and communication in the animal and the machine". Heinz von Foerster went on to distinguish a first order cybernetics, "the study of observed systems", and a second order cybernetics, "the study of observing systems". Second order cybernetics is explicitly based on a constructivist epistemology and is concerned with issues of self-reference, paying particular attention to the observer-dependence of knowledge, including scientific theories.

As cybernetics developed, its influence spread within the social sciences. Anthropologists Gregory Bateson and Margret Mead had already been prominent during the Macy conferences. Concepts from cybernetics spread throughout psychology from the 1950s onwards.

== See also ==
- Autopoiesis
- Cliodynamics
- Dynastic cycle
- General systems theory
- List of cycles
- Psychology
- Social cycle theory
- Sociocracy
- Sociology
- Superorganisms
- Systems philosophy
- Systems thinking
- War cycles
- World-systems theory
