= Outline of ants =

Overview of and topical guide to ants

The following outline is provided as an overview of and topical guide to ants:

Ants – social insects with geniculate (elbowed) antennae and a distinctive node-like structure that forms a slender waist. Ants are of the family Formicidae and evolved from wasp-like ancestors in the mid-Cretaceous period between 110 and 130 million years ago, diversifying after the rise of flowering plants. More than 12,500 out of an estimated total of 22,000 species have been classified.

== Essence of ants ==
- Ant colony
- Myrmecology – scientific study of ants

=== Biological classification ===
- Kingdom: Animalia
  - Phylum: Arthropoda
    - Class: Insecta
      - Order: Hymenoptera
        - Suborder: Apocrita
          - Superfamily: Vespoidea
            - Family: Formicidae (family authority: Latreille, 1809)

== Kinds of ants ==
Ant

- List of ant genera
- List of ants of Great Britain

=== Subfamilies ===
Extant subfamilies

- Agroecomyrmecinae
- Amblyoponinae
- Aneuretinae
- Dolichoderinae
- Dorylinae
- Ectatomminae
- Formicinae
- Heteroponerinae
- Leptanillinae
- Martialinae
- Myrmeciinae
- Myrmicinae
- Paraponerinae
- Ponerinae
- Proceratiinae
- Pseudomyrmecinae

Fossil subfamilies

- †Armaniinae (sometimes treated as the family Armaniidae within the superfamily Formicoidea)
- †Brownimeciinae
- †Formiciinae
- †Sphecomyrminae

== General myrmecology concepts ==
- Ant colony optimization algorithms
- Ant mill

== Myrmecologists ==
- Murray S. Blum (1929–2015)
- Barry Bolton
- Horace Donisthorpe (1870–1951)
- Auguste Forel (1848–1931)
- William Gould (1715–1799)
- Bert Hölldobler (born 1936)
- Thomas C. Jerdon (1811–1872)
- Sir John Lubbock (1st Lord and Baron Avebury) (1834–1913)
- Derek Wragge Morley (1920–1969)
- Frederick Smith (1805–1879)
- John Obadiah Westwood (1805–1893)
- William Morton Wheeler (1865–1937)
- E.O. Wilson (1929–2021)
