= Archaeo-optics =

Study of the experience and ritual use of light by ancient peoples

Archaeo-optics, or archaeological optics, is the study of the experience and ritual use of light by ancient peoples. Archaeological optics is a branch of sensory archaeology, which explores human perceptions of the physical environment in the remote past, and is a sibling of archaeoastronomy, which deals with ancient observations of celestial bodies, and archaeological acoustics, which deals with applications of sound.

Research by several investigators around the world has uncovered how ancient peoples encountered and used the camera obscura principle for a variety of purposes. In a darkened chamber, light passing through a small opening can create haunting and ephemeral moving images, which could have triggered and reinforced ground breaking modes of thought, forms of representation, and belief in otherworldly realms.

== Optical basis ==
=== Light ===
Visible light, a small portion of the electromagnetic spectrum, encompasses wavelengths between 380-750 nanometers, which humans perceive as the colors of the spectrum: red, orange, yellow, green, blue, indigo, and violet. Light behaves according to a well-defined set of rules: it travels in straight lines, unless otherwise refracted or reflected by another object, or curved by gravity.

=== Vision ===
An eye is essentially a darkened chamber with a small hole in front that allows light to enter. The lens, just behind the pupil's aperture, is perfectly clear but appears black because the interior space behind it is dark. Rays of light pass through the lens, producing an upside-down image on the retina. The brain reorients the image. This optical process of projecting an inverted image is known as a camera obscura (from the Latin, meaning dark room). The first pinhole/camera obscura eyes evolved about 540 million years ago on a sea mollusk, known as a nautilus, during the Cambrian period. The camera obscura principle is primordial, and life on earth has evolved to take advantage of it.

=== Camera obscura ===
The camera obscura principle is not limited to eyes, or even lenses, but works with a small hole, or aperture, and any darkened space of whatever size or shape. In modern times, camera obscuras have been fashioned from shoeboxes, oatmeal boxes, soda cans, cookie containers, seashells, eggshells, refrigerators, tents, trucks, airplane hangars, and even hollowed out forms of snow and dirt. A camera obscura can also be produced by a small hole in a roof, wall, or window-shutter through which the view of the outside is projected onto a wall inside a darkened room. Biologist Donald Perry went on an expedition into the rain forest of Costa Rica where he climbed into the cavity of a large hollow tree, and discovered a small hole that projected an upside-down image of the outside world onto the opposite interior wall of the trunk. This sort of experience is available across time.

The image created appears like an upside-down movie. A camera obscura relies on the contrast between the bright exterior world and a dim interior space, so that a greater contrast produces a more obvious projected image. Absolute darkness in the interior is not necessary, but there must be a significant difference between the two illumination levels.

== Archaeological basis ==
=== Architecture ===
The archaeological record is replete with excavations of built structures across time, but due to the natural decay of materials and the vagaries of preservation, the further backward in time, the less likely it is for artifacts to have survived. For example, Paleolithic shelter constructions from the Lower Paleolithic (c. 2,600,000–300,000 BP) and Middle Paleolithic (c. 300,000–45,000 BP) are generally less complete and thus subject to interpretation, while those dating to the Upper Paleolithic (c. 45,000–10,000 BP) are both more numerous and better preserved. Paleolithic structures generally have no remaining superstructure, and must be inferred from a footprint of artifacts.

By contrast, some Neolithic structures retain above ground elements. The Neolithic saw the rise of agriculture and the establishment of settlements, which produced a surplus of foodstuffs and an increase in population density. A large, coordinated labor force enabled the process of hauling enormous stones to build large, permanent structures. By about 5,000 BP, many groups of people over a widespread area were erecting large timbers and stones, or megaliths, to enclose communal spaces. Into historical times, the development of writing offered another layer of information, with descriptions of the physical appearance, materials, design, use, and events related to structures. This combination of remnants and records enhances the accuracy of archaeo-optical analysis.

=== Archaeological optics and archaeoastronomy ===
There is some evidence that prehistorical structures oriented upon the sun's position on the horizon also created camera obscura situations. Examples in Western Europe include midwinter sunrise at Newgrange, midwinter sunset at Maeshowe, and midsummer sunrise at Bryn Celli Ddu.

While archaeoastronomical studies have traditionally discussed these kinds of monument as observatories, fieldwork conducted in the 1990s at Balnuaran of Clava by Ronnie Scott and Tim Phillips suggests the midwinter sunset would have cast images inside two passage tombs. By temporarily reconstructing the collapsed roofs of these monuments, they noted that the act of viewing the sun along their passageways was not only potentially blinding but could only be clearly viewed by one person at a time. In contrast, an audience of over twenty people could stand with their backs to the opening to observe the effects of sunlight falling upon deliberately patterned stonework built into walls of both chambers. These observations inspired Scott to speculate that these structures were camera obscuras, and that an optical projection of the sun's disc would reproduce the movements of the sun through the sky for many people to see at once.

=== Archaeological optics and the archaeology of the senses ===
Archaeological optics contributes to a wider discipline, the archaeology of the senses. Rather than just recording the remains of the past such as standing stones or built walls, this wider discipline emphasizes how the spaces in-between these features could have been arenas for sensory experiences, even if parts of the original structures have disappeared. Among the senses, vision has been a major consideration, including studies of visibility between sites, interactions with geology and topography, archaeoastronomical alignment, or color symbolism. At the same time, anthropology has revealed societies that emphasize the other senses including qualities such as scent and smell. The social significance of the sensory of food and drink, and touch and texture can also be considered.

Other studies have examined archaeomusicology and archaeoacoustics. Palaeolithic bone artifacts have been interpreted as musical instruments, or ‘sound producing devices’, while some natural features within caves have been found to emit unusual sounds. There have also been suggestions that Paleolithic cave art clusters in locations where caverns have especially resonant properties. In the 1990s the sonic properties of built architecture came under increasing scrutiny with investigations into vocally induced resonances inside chambered Neolithic sites, as well as the wider acoustic phenomenon within a variety of megalithic structures.

An archaeology of the senses, including archaeological optics, emphasizes that the past was inhabited by living people whose experiences were inherently partial and subjective. Indeed, this subjectivity might have lent both meaning and mystery to events occurring within ancient structures. This acknowledges that the senses were likely to have been used and understood in very different ways by people through time.

== Development of the field of archaeological optics ==
The study of ancient perceptions of light developed from many disparate sources — archaeologists, artists, antiquarians, and astronomers — with precursors reaching back at least a millennium. In 1998, archaeologist Ronnie Scott speculated that Neolithic passage tombs in Scotland might have been used as camera obscuras. In 2000, Robert Temple published an investigation into crystal lenses that date to antiquity.

Archaeo-optics, as yet unnamed, arose as a formal line of inquiry beginning in 2005, with a presentation by Matt Gatton and his colleagues of "The Camera Obscura and the Origin of Art" at the University of Louisville, Kentucky. They made subsequent presentations at the University of Lisbon in 2006, and Archaeology Institute at Oxford University in 2007. A small number of researchers independently began to undertake archaeological optics fieldwork at Neolithic passage tombs. In 2011, Morgan Saletta published a paper noting camera obscura projections at two sites in the south of France. In 2011, Gatton began documenting optical projections at sites in Denmark. Aaron Watson, in collaboration with Ronnie Scott, began to record the archaeo-optic properties of monuments in Scotland in 2012, and Wales in 2014.

Since 2011, the concept of archaeological optics as a broader academic field has coalesced with Constantinos Papadopoulos and Holley Moyes's planning of the Oxford Handbook of Light in Archaeology, which brought researchers working along similar lines into contact.

== Palaeolithic archaeological optics ==
=== Paleolithic structures ===
The Lower Paleolithic was a time of early humans such as Homo habilis and Homo erectus. Possible indications of the early development of shelter construction during the Lower Paleolithic come from excavations at Olduvai Gorge, Melka Kunturé, Pont-de-Lavaud, Isernia La Pineta, Maozhushan, Bilzingsleben, and Terra Amata.

The Middle Paleolithic saw Homo erectus decline as Homo neanderthalensis developed in Eurasia, and Homo sapiens developed in Africa. Possible evidence of shelter construction in the Middle Paleolithic can be found at sites such as Port-Pignot, Saint-Vaast-la-Hougue, Le Lazaret, La Baume des Peyrards, Combe Grenal, La Butte d’Arvigny, La Folie, La Ferrassie, Biśnek, Vilas Ruivas, Ripiceni-Izvor, and Molodava I.

The Upper Paleolithic saw the expansion of Homo sapiens and the dwindling and ultimate extinction of Homo neanderthalensis. The best examples of Upper Paleolithic shelter practices come from excavations at such places as Kostienki, Cueva Morín, Grotte du Renne, Vigne-Brune, Dolní Věstonice, Les Peyrugues, Mezin, Ohalo II, Mal'ta, Le Cerisier, Plateau Perrain, Gontsy, Mezhirich, Gönnersdorf, Pincevent, and Borneck.

==== Taphonomy ====
The actual physical evidence of Paleolithic shelters is limited to permanent materials like stone and bone. No wooden post or animal hide has been found, because these materials disintegrate over the course of time. But the existence of the perishable elements can be established. Postholes prove the existence of the wooden supports. The alignment of the holes or a circle of support stones describes a footprint of a framework. The area covered by flint scattered from blade work, and other household activities, further demarcates the interior shape of the structure.

The types of stones, bones, and minerals found at the campsites further describe the use of animal hides as tent covering. Butchered and burned animal bones found around the fire pit show which types of animals were hunted and eaten. Stone tools such as hide scrapers and deposits of minerals employed in preparing skins show the routine use of animal hides. In addition, there are a host of ethnographic parallels, as indigenous cultures throughout the world relied on animal hides as a shelter covering material until the onset of the modern era.

==== Lifeways ====
The people of the Paleolithic existed prior to agriculture and the domestication of animals, and they would have lived as small bands of hunter-gatherers, moving from place to place, exploiting plant, animal, and mineral resources. Two of the factors that influenced choice of location were proximity to fresh water and animal migration routes. Paleolithic foragers would also set up camp overlooking fields inhabited by herds of hoofed herbivores.

Paleolithic campsites were characterized by repeated, seasonal, short-term occupation. While the inhabitants were quite mobile, without beasts of burden, shelters were not transported. A tent might stand at its location for a few years before it deteriorated and had to be rebuilt. The archaeological record describes shelters rebuilt over-and-over on roughly the same spot. Bands of Paleolithic hunter-gatherers followed an annual circuit with shelters built at strategic points along the way.

==== Hearths ====
Paleolithic campsites were dotted with external fire pits and internal hearths. The internal hearths were not open-burning fires, but were hollow areas that held heated stones and charcoal. The hearths acted as heat sinks, or heat traps, where thermal energy was stored and released slowly over time, to keep the dwelling warm. Hot stones and charcoals would be rolled, with sticks or bones, onto a thick animal hide and conveyed a couple of meters from the fire pit to the hearth. The next day the task would be repeated: hearths were taken apart and reassembled routinely. Frequent heating caused the rocks to discolor and crumble. Once a rock was no longer effective at holding heat, it was thrown in a nearby refuse pit along with animal bones and other household waste. An internal stone hearth is an effective strategy for staying warm, but it did not provide any light. The interiors of the tents were then dim places, where ancient people would have witnessed the camera obscura effect.

=== Paleolithic archaeological optics ===
Paleolithic archaeological optics involves investigations into the image projection capacities of Paleolithic tent reconstructions.

==== Reconstructions ====
The suitability of Paleolithic tents/shelters for coincidental camera obscura formation was explored during a set of experiments under the direction of Matt Gatton in 2005 and 2006. The first set of experiments took place on a bison ranch in Oldham County, Kentucky, where a small, rudimentary bison hide teepee was erected next to a pasture, and images of the bison were cast through a hole in the hides and projected into the tent. The second set of experiments occurred at a rock shelter outside of Irvine, Estill County, Kentucky, where the investigators leaned a framework of tree branches against a rock wall and covered it with bison hides. The image of a horse outside was projected through a rough hole in the hides and into the interior space. The third set of experiments took place at the Musée du Malgré-Tout in Belgium, where archaeologists Pierre Cattelain and Claire Bellier reconstructed a variety of Paleolithic structures in several places in France, Germany and Ukraine. A smattering of holes was present in the hide coverings of each tent. At the German site, images were projected inside the reconstruction onto a rabbit hide.

==== Statistical analysis ====
The tent reconstructions established some plausibility of accidental camera obscura formation during the Paleolithic, but plausibility is not probability, so the question of the probable frequency of projected images was explored by Bayesian statistical modeling.

To evaluate the probability of an unknown event a series of conditional probabilities were used to create a chance tree using TreeAge Pro 2011 (Williamstown, MA). The conditions affecting the appearance of projected images are the general context of the shelter, aperture existence, aperture size, sunlight exposure, weather, occupancy, and the specific context of the dwelling. Given the different situations regarding variables; the probability of a person observing a projected image inside a Palaeolithic dwelling ranged from 1% to 8% per day, or 4 to 29 times per year. Multiplying the yearly occurrences by the range of years and the estimated human population; camera obscura images could have been observed anywhere from 54.8 billion to 4.38 trillion times (5.48×10^{10} to 4.38×10^{12}) over the course of prehistory.

=== Implications ===
The likely prevalence of prehistoric camera obscuras throughout the human experience suggests several important implications for the development of art, religious beliefs, philosophy and existing cave art.

==== Art ====
The origins of art have been a significant mystery, because art, as a form of communication, is largely a social construct. The core issue is that there can be no intention to represent an object or scene without first knowing that such a depiction is possible. Researchers have encountered great difficulty coming up with explanations of how prehistoric people first stumbled upon the idea of the possibility of representation. The archaeo-optical explanation is that images projected inside a dwelling space provided, according to Cambridge professor Nigel Spivey, "… a prototypical visual experience that triggers the concept of representation…" In addition, the images would be shared experiences, visible by everyone in the tent or structure at the same time. The group could thus collectively experience, discuss, verify, confirm, investigate, and interpret the images projected on the surfaces before them. It is the communal aspect of the images that makes the development of visual art socially feasible.

"A randomly projected image stands for a real object; it says bison without being a flesh and blood bison, planting the idea of a referent, the conceptual beginning of art." -Matt Gatton

==== Faith ====
It is also possible that camera obscura images could have fostered religious belief. A broad definition of religion is a belief in an alternative realm that influences physical reality. Theologian Rudolf Otto held that the origins of religion are to be found in the concept of the sacred, the divine presenting itself as something "wholly other" (ganz andere). The images projected in Paleolithic tents would have offered an early gateway to the concept of an alternative realm, a glimpse of an "other", that initiated a belief in something that was not seen moment to moment. The images, once seen, lingered in the mind, and took root in the culture.

“The camera’s image instantly splits a quasi-reality away from reality, peeling off an ‘other’ from the ‘is’; instilling the very idea that animals, plants, and humans have existences in other forms, spirits, on other planes.” - Matt Gatton

Once the concept of an alternative realm had taken root, it would have provided a domain for agents of an "other" world to intervene in human affairs. The notion of spirit forms is the very root of animism, the oldest known, and perhaps first, form of religion. The incidental image is possibly the first glimpse of the "divine".

==== Philosophy ====
The core issue of metaphysics is the investigation of the nature of reality. The images in a Paleolithic tent would trigger a cascade of thoughts about the essence of reality: What is that plane of existence? And reflexively, what is this plane? Only by glimpsing an alternative reality does this reality become open to question — the very start of abstract examination.

==== Schematicized distortions ====
The projections by camera obscura can also explain some common features among cave paintings of animals and people. Paleolithic cave art is well known for iconic, schematicized figures, usually with extremely small heads and enormous, often bowed, bodies. Examples of the core elements of some Paleolithic cultures’ visual lexicon — repetition, disconnection, movement, superimposition, and distortion — are expressed in engravings on flat stones and bones within the habitation sites and also on the walls of deep caves.

In May 2005, Matt Gatton, Walter Brock, and Dylan Brock set up a room-sized camera obscura on a farm in Harrodsburg, Kentucky. The image of a horse was projected on to a small flat stone. It was natural for the artist to catch the image with his torso, the engraving stone secured against the body, and the eyes looking down on the inverted image. In this scenario it was advantageous to tilt the stone slightly. The more the stone was tilted the more the image of the animal distorted, the animal's head reducing in size and the stomach bowing downward, quite like the distortions seen in some deep cave art. This distortion is known as the keystone effect. Gatton proposed that the deep cave distortions may have resulted from the camera obscura effects within the tents.

=== Paleolithic archaeo-optic concepts in wider culture ===
The hypothesis that paleolithic people would have seen camera obscura effects within their shelters—Gatton's Paleolithic Camera Obscura Theory—has gained wider exposure in the last several years, including specific references in the following venues.

- Dr. Nigel Spivey in How Art Made the World: Cambridge Interviews: Episode 2, "The Day Pictures Were Born" KCET/BBC, 22 June 2006. Series produced by Mark Hedgecoe and directed by Robin Dashwood
- The exposition "Le cinéma/Pré-cinéma" at the Malle Pédagogique, Collège of Cinéma at Calvados in Caen, France (2009-2010).
- The 2014 Artefact Festival in Leuven, Belgium was themed on Gatton's Palaeolithic Camera Obscura Theory, "De Prehistorie van het Beeld" (The Prehistory of the Image). Pierre Cattelain and Claire Bellier and their team from the Musée du Malgré-Tout built a replica of the Paleolithic Le Ceriser tent (c. 18,000 BP) in the atrium in the Tweebronnen public library. Gatton was on hand to show visitors how images were projected inside the tent. After the festival the tent was disassembled, and transported to the Musée du Malgré-Tout for permanent installation.
- The introduction of Season 1, Episode 5 "Hiding in the Light" of Cosmos: A Space Time Odyssey, which first aired in the USA on 6 April 2014. The series was produced by a partnership of the National Geographic Channel and FOX, and was written by Ann Druyan and Steven Soter, and narrated by Neil deGrasse Tyson.
- Picture THIS, Podcast #1: The Ancient Camera (Camera Obscura). Hosted by Chelsea and Tony Northrup, The Art and Science of Photography, 25 January 2016

== Neolithic archaeological optics ==
The Neolithic period offers the possibility to explore optical image projections within built architecture. Neolithic structures range from modest houses to enormous enclosures and mounds, and were constructed using combinations of earth, timber and stone. Archaeo-optic fieldwork has focused upon megalithic monuments.

=== Megalithic structures ===
Megaliths, or large stones, come in two main types of architectural presentations: freestanding and earth-covered. Individual and groupings of standing stones — in formations of circles, lines, ovals, ‘U’-shapes, or rectangles — were not employed to support the weight of soil above them, but served as markers. Megalithic chambers designed to bear the weight of a mound of earth, turf, rubble or stone have been classified into groups, including dolmens, portal dolmens, gallery graves, wedge tombs, passage tombs, and court tombs. The term "dolmen" describes groupings of erected stones supporting one large, flat roof stone, like an oversized rudimentary table. "Portal dolmens" have an angled stone slab supported by uprights that define a chamber, often with an entrance. "Gallery" graves are elongated dolmens consisting of two rows of upright stones (orthostats) supporting a series of flat roof stones (lintels). "Wedge" tombs are wider at the mouth, and narrower as they recede inward. "Passage tombs" have a long boulder-built passage that leads to a buried chamber. "Court" tombs are so-named because they have what appears to be a courtyard encircled by standing stones in front of the tomb chamber. Although many of these structures now appear as freestanding monuments, their stones were often the skeletal substructures of mounds removed by erosion or human action.

A major focus for megalithic chambers is in western Europe: Scandinavia, the British Isles, France, and Iberia. Their origin, chronology and purpose is a subject of ongoing research and debate. In fact, they are not limited to Europe, and are found across Eurasia and the entire globe. Their significance in past cultures is suggested by the labor and resources required to create them. The painstakingly and intricately constructed mounds were significant feats, requiring tens of thousands of hours to construct. For example, it has been speculated that a workforce of 400 working continuously for two months every year would have taken around 16 years to construct the 200,000 tonne cairn at Newgrange.

In the British Isles it is possible that many different kinds of chambered monument, including those constructed from timber, may have been suited to the creation of optical phenomenon. Recent studies have focused upon one format in particular: the megalithic passage tomb.

==== Passage tombs ====
Passage tombs comprise a single stone-built passageway that gives access to a central chamber, and there may be adjoining chambers or cells. This structure is entirely covered by a mound that might consist of earth, rubble, turf or clay. Their distribution extends across the west of Europe. Determining the exact numbers of these sites is problematic due to the poor preservation of many. There are over one hundred and fifty proven passage tombs in Ireland, with an overall estimate of over three hundred in total, roughly five hundred in Denmark, and over 250 in Scotland. Their classification has been further divided into groups such as the Orkney-Cromarty, Maeshowe and Clava traditions, but all retain the same fundamental format. Their construction likely began in the earlier Neolithic soon after 5600 BP and extends to around 4000 BP at excavated examples of Clava Cairn passage tombs, but this need not imply that they were constructed or used throughout this time.

==== Passage tomb Preservation ====
The survival of passage tombs is variable and dependent upon many factors. The excavation of two later Neolithic passage graves at Balnuaran of Clava demonstrated that their architecture was inherently unstable and would have likely collapsed within decades of their construction. Earlier examples, including the Orkney-Cromarty format, appear to generally have been more robust. Passage tombs could also be reused in later times, including the Iron Age and early Medieval, and their Neolithic content was sometimes removed. Some were destroyed when new structures were built upon them. Most have required consolidation, reconstruction or strengthening to allow public access. In the Boyne Valley, Newgrange and Knowth have undergone significant excavation and restoration. In Orkney, the roof of the chamber within Maeshowe has been restored following damage caused by Vikings in the twelfth century. In some cases, recent building work has significantly altered their appearance, a critical factor that has to be taken into account when observing and interpreting optical phenomena within their passages and chambers.

==== Conundrum of use ====
Passage tombs across Europe have long been a focus for myths and legends. Medieval lore has it that wizards, giants, witches, or demons erected the great stones, and that the mounds were the homes of gnomes, elves, faeries, and goblins. In Denmark, passage graves are still referred to as jættestuer (troll houses). An analysis of Irish folk tales revealed that megalithic mounds both served as the burial places of ancient heroes, and were the abodes of supernatural beings.

Many passage tombs do indeed contain the remains of the dead—sometimes in significant quantities. For example, excavations at Quanterness revealed the bones of 157 individuals of various ages, but the total number held within the tomb may have been nearer to 400. Animal remains and artifacts are also found at some sites, including beads, stone balls and pottery.

It appears that burial was not the sole function of passage "tombs". Some sites contain little evidence of human remains, although this could reflect their subsequent histories, while others have evidence for activities by the living. Fires were burnt within sites in Orkney and at Knowth, Dowth and Newgrange in Ireland there are examples where images were carved in situ upon stones within their interiors. The passages at a number of sites align with sunrise or sunset at pivotal times of the year causing their otherwise darkened chambers to be illuminated. Many demonstrate extraordinary acoustic properties. Together, these factors suggest that passage tombs might be interpreted as venues for diverse activities that involved both the living and the dead.

=== The use of passage tombs as camera obscuras ===
The principal fieldwork exploring the optical properties of passage tombs has been conducted by Matt Gatton in Denmark, Morgan Saletta in France, Aaron Watson in Wales, Aaron Watson and Ronnie Scott in Scotland, and Eva Bosch in Spain.

==== Format ====
The format of passage tombs is uniquely suited to the creation and control of optical projections. These structures reproduce the fundamental format of a camera obscura and fieldwork has demonstrated that they can indeed have remarkable projection capabilities. The chamber offers a dark space while the single passageway enables the movement of light to be closely controlled. In some cases their basic configuration alone is sufficient to cast a projection, and a small number offer mechanisms through which light can be closely controlled. For example, the roof-box at Newgrange has evidence for the repeated relocation of quartz blocks that could have been used to manipulate optical projections. In the majority of cases, however, additional apertures were required.

==== Restricted access ====
The entrances at many passage tombs appear to have been temporarily sealed in a variety of ways: boulders, slabs, blocks, planks or wooden frameworks, as evidenced by postholes by the entrance. Maeshowe has a recess near to the passage entrance that holds a carefully balanced portal stone that can be pivoted into place. This leaves a narrow gap between the top of this block and the passage lintels, thereby allowing light to enter even when the passageway is impassable to people. In contrast, the roof box at Newgrange is situated above the passageway, as is a comparable feature within Cairn G at Carrowkeel. These apertures could be operated independently to the passages. Even in the absence of such devices only minor additions - stone blocks, a hole in a wooden plank, or an animal hide hung between posts at the entrance - are required to convert the monument into an operational camera obscura. The passage serves as a conduit for light and the rear of the chamber acts as a projection surface.

==== Aperture plane ====
The character of optical projections within passage tombs is determined by a number of interconnected factors. Lighting inside the monument needs to be low but total darkness is not always required, depending on the relative brightness outside. Observations at the Grey Cairns of Camster by Aaron Watson and Ronnie Scott showed that it was possible to cast projections in fog, rain and under heavy cloud, but that such conditions significantly impaired their clarity. The size and brightness of projections can be adjusted both by modifying the size of the aperture and moving the aperture plane itself in relation to the focal plane, which is frequently the wall of the chamber aligned with the passageway. Increasing the focal distance by moving the aperture along the passage increases the size of the projection but also reduces its brightness. Reducing the aperture diameter results in a more focused, but increasingly dark, image. A further contributing factor is the texture of the surface upon which the image is projected. For example, observations by Aaron Watson have revealed that the slab that constitutes the back wall of the chamber at Bryn Celli Ddu is smooth enough to carry a detailed image. In contrast, projections inside Cuween Hill fall upon rough stone walling, requiring the distance between the aperture and focal plane to be increased, thereby enlarging the image in order to render it visible.

=== Types of images projected within Neolithic passage tombs ===
==== Images of the sun ====
When aligned upon the sun, a properly configured passage tomb is capable of casting an enlarged image of the solar disc. As long as the aperture remains static this projected solar disc will move along the wall as the sun moves across the sky. During sunrise, for example, the sun's image will appear to travel across the chamber and then out along the walls of the passageway. Gatton has suggested that images carved upon the chamber walls of Cairn T at Loughcrew may reproduce these movements of the sun's disc.

In 2011, archaeologist Morgan Saletta reported solar projections within the sites of Grotte de Bounias and Grotte de la Source during equinoctial sunsets. These were a result of the architectural format of these monuments creating sufficiently restricted apertures to cast a distinct, though unfocused, projection.

During the time of midsummer sunrise in 2014 and 2015, Aaron Watson documented solar projections within Bryn Celli Ddu. By locating the aperture close to the chamber it was possible to cast a distinct image of nearby trees and the rising sun, together framed by the outline of the passage. In contrast, relocating the aperture to the passage entrance significantly enlarged the sun's disc to a diameter of 10 cm.

==== Images of aligned monuments ====
If a passage tomb is aligned upon another monument, the camera obscura method can be used to project recognisable images of that monument into the chamber. For example, while the setting sun shines directly into Maeshowe's chamber when the sun is at its southwestern extreme (winter solstice sunset), there is also a reverse alignment (summer solstice sunrise) when the sun is at its northeastern extreme. This will illuminate the distant Barnhouse Stone such that its image could be projected inside Maeshowe's chamber.

At Balnuaran of Clava, two neighbouring passage tombs share a south-westerly axis in order that their passageways open towards the midwinter sunset. Not only does the cairn to the south-west appear centrally framed when looking down the passage from that to the north-east, but fieldwork by Ronnie Scott and Tim Phillips has documented how the midwinter setting sun appears to descend directly into the apex of its roof.

==== Images of the landscape ====
Many passage tombs are set in elevated situations with extensive views, or even focused upon distinctive topographic features. These would therefore appear within optical projections inside their chambers. Aaron Watson has documented optical projections inside Cuween Hill, Orkney, that feature expansive views across the Bay of Firth. Inside the Dwarfie Stane, also in Orkney, it is possible to cast a panoramic image of the uplands of Hoy.

While the majority of passage tombs may have lost their lintels and roofs it is possible to consider the views that may originally have been projected into their chambers. For example, the ruinous site of Badnabay, north-west Scotland, appears to be aligned upon a mountain with a distinctive profile.

==== Images of people ====
Reflected sunlight can illuminate people located within passage tomb forecourts, creating what Gatton has described as "spirit" projections due to their ephemeral, spectral qualities. When backlit these figures appear as dark silhouettes, but at those times when the sun is behind the monument, and the forecourt area brightly lit, they are enhanced in color and detail. Aaron Watson has photographed optical projections of people inside Cuween Hill, Wideford Hill, Vinquoy Hill, the Dwarfie Stane and the Grey Cairns of Camster.

Camera obscura projections move in real time, although projected human figures appear upside down and back to front. This creates distinctive illusions where individuals, or even groups of people, can appear to emerge from the chamber wall. As the angles between the external subject and the aperture become increasingly oblique, projections can also be cast upon the floor, walls and ceiling of a monument. This can create the illusion of a human shadow moving through the passage tomb.

=== Immersive multisensory experiences within passage tombs ===
Passage tomb architecture spatially constrains the number of people who can simultaneously occupy their chambers, effectively restricting access to specialist kinds of knowledge and unusual combinations of sensory experience. Whether these sites embody astronomical orientations, occupy special places in the landscape, or acted as the receptacles for ancestral remains, the camera obscura theory expands the significance and meaning of light entering these monuments.

Inverted images of the outside world, viewed by people located in the depths of a megalithic cairn, would very effectively generate a sense of "otherness". Furthermore, people in the Neolithic did not share present-day knowledge of optical physics, and would have had their own understandings. Even from a scientific perspective, however, the act of witnessing the projection of the sun's disc, or human figures emerging from a stone wall, is rather suggestive of an encounter with the supernatural. It has been suggested that projections of the sun may have been interpreted as the manifestation of a Neolithic solar deity.

Finally, optical projections converge with other sensory qualities of these places, potentially including the presence of the remains of the dead, rock art, and dynamic archaeo-acoustic sound effects. There is also a possibility that these kinds of experiences were combined and choreographed in order to maximize their theatrical impact upon an audience. Rather than silent places of the death, passage tombs may have acted as places where people could engage with powerful multi-sensory experiences.

== Ancient Egyptian funerary monuments ==
The Ancient Egyptians may have also witnessed—and recorded—camera obscura effects. Ancient Egyptian texts, known collectively as the Books of the Netherworld, describe pharaonic funerary complexes as sun-powered resurrection machines that somehow affected a merger of the pharaoh's soul with the sun god. The continuation of the entire cosmos was dependent upon the sun god who was regenerated in darkness.

The ancient Egyptian concept of the pharaonic soul was complicated and divided into several aspects. The ka aspect was a spirit double, created at birth, with the physical appearance of the person. After death, the ka would leave the body and travel through the underworld at night and return to its physical representation (the mummy, statue, or artworks) each morning. Pharaonic mortuary temples, which faced east toward the dawn sun and were affixed to the side of pyramids during the pyramid building era, featured a darkened inner sanctuary with a ka statue of the pharaoh. When the sun rose on the horizon, its rays would travel down the central passageway of the temple, and project the image of the sun onto the ka and, conversely, reflect the ka back to the sun, uniting the two. This is the conceptual leap that underpins Ancient Egyptian culture — the pharaoh's soul road on a beam of light.

== Ancient Greek mystery cult rites ==
Mystery religions dominated the Mediterranean sphere during classical antiquity. The foremost Mystery sect was the hallowed rite of the Goddess Persephone at Eleusis, Greece, which held sway for nearly two thousand years (from at least 1500 BCE until the end of fourth century CE). The Eleusinian Mysteries started out as a small localized religion, grew steadily, and were adopted as part of the state religion of nearby Athens around 600 BCE.

Inside the dark cavernous temple was a sacred smaller building that held cult objects, normally sculptural idols, and a very bright fire. In the temple, the initiates had a direct face-to-face experience with the gods, who appeared as phantoms of light. Plato describes initiates experiencing "perfect, simple, calm, and blissful apparitions [eudaímona phásmata] in a pure light …" (Phaedrus 250c).

The optical principle of the camera obscura — an image cast into a dark area from an adjacent bright area via a small aperture — works irrespective of the scale of the dark and light areas. If the inside of a room is made very bright and the outside is very dark then a hole will cast the image from the smaller space to the larger, rather like a movie projector in a theater. Matt Gatton has proposed the priests (or priestesses) at Eleusis had operated a rudimentary projection booth, an "Eleusinian Projector", where the priest's holy fire-room acted as the box of light and the dark cavernous space crowded with initiates was the theater.

The initiates were not directing their attention toward the priest or the sacred house, but looking the other direction at spectral images that they believed were gods, shining and moving about…

— Matt Gatton, The Eleusinian Projector: The hierophant’s optical method of conjuring the goddess.
