= Outline of Jewish law =

Ethnoreligious group's religious rules

This outline of Jewish religious law consists of the book and section headings of the Maimonides' redaction of Jewish law, the Mishneh Torah, which details all of Jewish observance. Also listed for each section are the specific mitzvot covered by that section. These may be found in the article 613 Mitzvot in the section on Maimonides' List.

== I. The Book of Intelligence ==
Laws concerning foundations of the Torah (Mitzvot: 1–10)
Laws concerning temperament (Mitzvot: 11–21)
Laws concerning studying Torah (Mitzvot: 22–23)
Laws concerning idolatry (Mitzvot: 24–74)
Laws concerning repentance (Mitzvah 75)

== II. The Book of Serving the Lord ==
Laws concerning reading the Shema (Mitzvah 76)
Laws concerning prayer and the Priestly Blessing (Mitzvot: 77–78)
Laws concerning Tephillin, Sefer Torah, and Mezuzah (Mitzvot: 79–83)
Laws concerning Tzitzit (Mitzva 84)
Laws concerning blessings (Mitzva 85)
Laws concerning circumcision (Mitzva 86)

== III. The Book of Appointed Times ==
Laws concerning Shabbat (Mitzvot: 87–91)
Laws concerning Eruv (Only Rabbinic Laws)
Laws concerning resting on Yom Kippur (Mitzvot: 92–95)
Laws concerning resting on holidays (Mitzvot: 96–107)
Laws concerning Chometz and Matzo (Mitzvot: 108–115)
Laws concerning Shofar, Sukkah, and Lulav (Mitzvot: 116–118)
Laws concerning Shekelim (Mitzva: 119)
Laws concerning designation of the new month (Mitzva: 120)
Laws concerning fasts (Mitzva: 121)
Laws concerning Megilla and Hanukkah (only Rabbinic Laws)

== IV. The Book of Women ==
Laws concerning marriage (Mitzvot: 122–125)
Laws concerning divorce (Mitzvot: 126–127)
Laws concerning Yibbum and Halitza (Mitzvot: 128–130)
Laws concerning a young virgin (Mitzvot: 131–135)
Laws concerning a faithless wife (Mitzvot: 136–138)

== V. The Book of Holiness ==
Laws concerning forbidden sexual relations and laws concerning converts (Mitzvot: 139–175)
Laws concerning forbidden foods (Mitzvot: 176–203)
Laws concerning Kosher slaughter (Mitzvot: 204–208)

== VI. The Book of Vows ==
Laws concerning vows about oneself (Mitzvot: 209–213)
Laws concerning vows about ones property (Mitzvot: 214–216)
Laws concerning becoming a Nazirite (Mitzvot: 217–223)
Laws concerning dedicating ones value or property to the Temple (Mitzvot: 226–233)

== VII. The Book of Seeds ==
Laws concerning planting mixed seeds (Mitzvot: 234–238)
Laws concerning gifts to the poor (Mitzvot: 239–251)
Laws concerning donation to a Kohen (Mitzvot: 252–259)
Laws concerning tithes (Mitzva: 260)
Laws concerning second tithe and fourth year fruit (Mitzvot: 261–269)
Laws concerning first fruit and gifts to a Kohen (Mitzvot: 270–278)
Laws concerning the seventh year and the fiftieth year (Mitzvot: 279–300)

== VIII. The Book Of the Temple in Jerusalem ==
Laws concerning the place that was chosen (Mitzvot: 301–306)
Laws concerning utensils of the Temple (Mitzvot: 307–320)
Laws concerning entrance to the Temple (Mitzvot: 321–335)
Laws concerning things prohibited on the altar (Mitzvot: 336–349)
Laws concerning the offering of the sacrifices (Mitzvot: 350–372)
Laws concerning daily and additional sacrifices (Mitzvot: 373–391)
Laws concerning things that make an offering unusable (Mitzvot: 392–399)
Laws concerning the temple service on Yom Kippur (Mitzva: 400)
Laws concerning misusing Temple property (Mitzvot: 401–403)

== IX. The Book of Sacrifices ==
Laws concerning the Passover sacrifice (Mitzvot: 404–419)
Laws concerning the holiday sacrifices (Mitzvot: 420–425)
Laws concerning the first fruits (Mitzvot: 426–430)
Laws concerning sacrifices for inadvertent sins (Mitzvot: 431–435)
Laws concerning the time before atonement (Mitzvot: 436–439)
Laws concerning switching consecrated animals (Mitzvot: 440–442)

== X. The Book of Purity ==
Laws concerning impurity from the dead (Mitzva: 443)
Laws concerning the Red Heifer (Mitzvot: 444–445)
Laws concerning impurity from the plague (Mitzvot: 446–453)
Laws concerning impurity from lying or sitting (Mitzvot: 454–457)
Laws concerning impurity from other categories (Mitzvot: 458–460)
Laws concerning impurity of foods (Mitzva: 461)
Laws concerning a Mikveh (Mitzva: 462)

== XI. The Book of Damages ==
Laws concerning damage through property (Mitzvot: 463–466)
Laws concerning sneak thievery (Mitzvot: 467–473)
Laws concerning brazen stealing and loss (Mitzvot: 474–480)
Laws concerning hitting and other dangers (Mitzva: 481)
Laws concerning murderers and guarding a life (Mitzvot: 482–498)

== XII. The Book of Acquisition ==
Laws concerning sales (Mitzvot: 499–503)
Laws concerning rights and presents, neighbors, agents and partners, and slaves (Mitzvot: 504–516)

== XIII. The Book of Civil Law ==
Laws concerning hiring (Mitzvot: 517–523)
Laws concerning pawning and deposits (Mitzvot: 524–525)
Laws concerning loaning and borrowing (Mitzvot: 526–537)
Laws concerning claimant and defendant (Mitzva: 538)
Laws concerning inheritance (Mitzva: 539)

== XIV. The Book of Judges ==
Laws concerning the Sanhedrin and punishments that only they can impose (Mitzvot: 540–569)
Laws concerning testimony (Mitzvot: 570–577)
Laws concerning judges who rebel against decisions of higher courts (Mitzvot: 578–586)
Laws concerning mourners (Mitzvot: 587–590)
Laws concerning kings and their wars (Mitzvot: 591–613)

== See also ==
Many translations of words are per Prof. Marcus Jastrow. His dictionary A Dictionary of the Targumim, the Talmud Babli and Yerushalmi, and the Midrashic Literature (copyright 1904) is in the public domain, and is available for download at Google Books.

- Mishneh Torah- Table of Contents in Wikisource.
