= Pharmacocybernetics =

Upcoming field of study

Pharmacocybernetics (also known as pharma-cybernetics, cybernetic pharmacy and cyberpharmacy) is an upcoming field that describes the science of supporting drugs and medications use through the application and evaluation of informatics and internet technologies, so as to improve the pharmaceutical care of patients. It is an interdisciplinary field that integrates the domains of medicine and pharmacy, computer sciences (informatics, cybernetics, interactive digital media, human-computer-environment interactions) and psychological sciences to design, develop, apply and evaluate technological innovations which improve drugs and medications management, as well as prevent or solve drug-related problems.

== Terminology ==
"Pharmaco" originates from the Greek word "pharmakon", which means drugs or poisons; while "cybernetics" originates from the Greek word "kubernetes", which means "the art of steering". Norbert Wiener first defined cybernetics as the science or study of "control and communication in the animal and the machine". Since then, the American Society for Cybernetics has further described this field as "the design or discovery and application of principles of regulation and communication".

Cybernetics has been applied to many fields, such as anthropology, sociology, systems theory, psychology, biology, computer science and engineering. The defining characteristic of a cybernetic system is its relationship between endogenous goals and the external environment. In the 1970s, cybernetics was applied in healthcare as a means of setting positive outcome goals for patients who were not satisfied with their plastic surgeries. The emergence of "new cybernetics" or "second-order cybernetics" further expanded this concept to include the interactions between cybernetic systems and the people interacting with them, as well as to society as a whole.

Cybernetics also includes the concept of "cyberspace", which is described by the science fiction author William Gibson as a virtual representation of information in varying states of accessibility that is linked to various people and organizations in his book Neuromancer. This concept is also reiterated in the movie "The Matrix" and its sequels, which revolves around Neo (Keanu Reeves), a computer programmer, who lives in a simulated matrix world created by sentient machines but perceived by humans as reality. The term "cyberspace" is now used ubiquitously to describe anything that is associated with computers, informatics and internet technologies, and also user experiences through interactions with these technologies.

== Context ==
The increased popularity of informatics and internet technologies in healthcare has led to the development of various software, tools and applications for healthcare professionals and patients to improve pharmaceutical care and health-related outcomes. Pharmacoinformatics (or pharmacy informatics) is a field within e-health that targets drug-related problems through the use of informatics and internet technologies. Pharmacocybernetics goes one step further by merging the science of technology with human-computer-environment interactions, so that technological innovations can be designed, developed, applied and evaluated in relation to supporting medicines and drugs use, as well as to reduce or prevent drug-related problems. Pharmacocybernetic approaches target patient care and safety, and they take into account the flow of information and knowledge between users and cybernetic systems or the environment, the actions taken by users to achieve their goals, user interactivity, as well as feedback. This field requires clinical knowledge and experience, as well as advanced skills and expertise to deal with technologies and human-computer-environment interactions in relation to the management of medicines and drug therapies.

== Relation to pharmaceutical care and drug-related problems ==
Pharmaceutical care involves the identification, solving and prevention of medication/drug-related problems with regards to patients' drug therapies. These problems are classified into various categories, which differ slightly between the American and European systems.

The American Society of Health-System Pharmacists classifies drug-related problems into eight major categories:

- Untreated indications
- Medication use without indication
- Failure to receive medications
- Improper drug selections
- Underdose
- Overdose
- Adverse drug reactions
- Drug interactions

The Pharmaceutical Care Network Europe classifies them by problems and causes:

Classification by problems:

- Treatment effectiveness
- Adverse reactions
- Treatment costs
- Other types of problems

Classification by causes:

- Drug selection
- Drug form
- Dose selection
- Treatment duration
- Drug use/administration process
- Logistics-related
- Patient-related
- Other causes

The rapid adoption of cybermedicine has led to several other associated medication/drug-related problems. These include:

- Digital dehumanization of the patient-practitioner relationship
- Virtual conflicts of recommendation
- Phenomenon of online self-prescribing

Pharmacocybernetics approaches target the whole digital healthcare innovation cycle from identifying the healthcare problem, designing, developing, applying and evaluating the technological innovations that aim to address these drug-related problems. These technological innovations tend to be based on user-centered, experience-centered and activity-centered designs.

== Types of environments ==
The types of environments that are relevant to pharmacocybernetics approaches follow Urie Bronfenbrenner's Ecological Systems Theory. These environments, when applied to healthcare (for example, when a patient with a chronic disease searches the internet for information regarding his drug therapy), are as follows:

- Microsystem (the patient's immediate environment): The physical characteristics of the desktop or laptop, mouse sensitivity, or hardware and software faults that the patient experiences when performing the task.
- Mesosystem (the relation between the patient's immediate environments): Whether the patient carries out the task alone or in the company of others will affect his experiences, psychological state and behavior.
- Exosystem (the external settings that indirectly affect but do not include the patient): When his family also understands his medical condition and drug therapy, they can provide encouragement and support which will prompt a sense of closeness experienced by the patient. This in turn may lead to improved medication compliance.
- Macrosystem (cultural context of the patient): Sharing of his experiences with other similar patients on social networking channels may alleviate the stigma felt and positively influence and enhance the experiences of the patient.
- Chronosystem (the time-space dimension over the patient's course of life): As the patient gains more moral support in time from others with similar experiences, he can better adapt to life and may be motivated to improve his lifestyle and keep healthy.

== Pharmacocybernetic maxims ==
Four pharmacocybernetic maxims have been defined for designers and developers of pharmaco-informatics tools and applications that provide information on medications and drug therapies. These design principles are in relation to:

1. Quality of drug information: The quality of the drug information provided by the tool/application should be accurate and evidence based. Its content should follow that from appropriate sources, such as research articles, established drug databases and drug package information.
2. Quantity of drug information: The tool/application should provide adequate content regarding the medication or drug therapy so that its users have enough knowledge to minimize the likelihood of drug-related problems.
3. Relation to target audiences: The medication- or drug-related content provided by the tool/application should be relevant to its target audience and clarify their doubts.
4. Manner of data presentation: The information provided by the tool/application should be presented in a clear manner that avoids ambiguity and misinterpretation.
