= Outline of sinology =

Overview of and topical guide to sinology

The following outline is provided as an overview of and topical guide to sinology:

Sinology is the study of China and things related to China. In today's usage, the term most often refers to work by non-Chinese or Chinese living outside China. Sino- is derived from Latin Sinae or Sinim ("the Chinese"), the origin of which is debatable. In the context of area studies, sinology is usually known as Chinese studies.

== Essence ==
- China is the world's second-most populous country, with approximately 1.41 billion people as of 2025, and the third-largest country by land area at about 9.6 million km².
- Chinese Culture – one of the world's oldest and most complex cultures, with varying regional customs and traditions in the fields of architecture, literature, music, visual arts, martial arts, cuisine, and more.
  - Culture of the People's Republic of China – blend of traditional Chinese culture, communism and international modern and post-modern influences, particularly other countries in East Asia and Southeast Asia.
  - Culture of Taiwan – blend of traditional and modern understandings of Confucianist Han Chinese, Japanese, European, American, global, local, and Taiwanese aborigines cultures formed into a Taiwanese cultural identity.
- Chinese literature – extends over thousands of years, became prominent with the Hundred Schools of Thought that occurred during the Eastern Zhou dynasty (770–256 BCE). Widespread woodblock printing during the Tang dynasty (618–907) and the invention of movable type printing (990–1051) during the Song dynasty (960–1279) rapidly spread written knowledge throughout China.
- Chinese philosophy – Chinese culture of thought spanning thousands of years, much of which began during a period known as the "Hundred Schools of Thought".
- Science and technology in China – ancient Chinese advances began 2,500 years ago during the Warring States period. Ancient Chinese philosophers made significant advances in science, technology, mathematics, medicine and astronomy. Knowledge expanded with exchange of Western and Chinese discoveries.

== General concepts ==
- Greater China – refers to mainland China, Hong Kong, Macau and Taiwan.
- Overseas Chinese – people of Chinese birth or descent who live outside of Greater China.
- Sinophile – a person who demonstrates a strong interest in aspects of Chinese culture or its people.
- Sinosphere – refers to a grouping of countries and regions that are currently inhabited with a majority of Chinese population or were historically under Chinese cultural influence. It is also known as Chinese cultural sphere and Chinese character cultural sphere.

== Sinologists ==
- List of sinologists

== See also ==
- Sinicization
- Sinitic languages
