= Organizational Anthropology =

Sub-field in social anthropology

'Organizational Anthropology' is a sub-field in social anthropology dedicated to the study of organizations in different cultural contexts.

The role of anthropology in organizations has expanded significantly since the end of the 20th century. Much of this development can be attributed to the rise in anthropologists working outside of academia and the increasing importance of globalization in both organizations and the field of anthropology. Anthropologists can be employed by organizations such as for-profit businesses, nonprofit organizations, and governments. For instance, cultural anthropologists are commonly employed by the United States federal government.

Organizational anthropology may analyze labor unions, businesses ranging from small enterprises to corporations, government, medical organizations, education, prisons, and financial institutions. Nongovernmental organizations have garnered particular interest in the field of organizational anthropology because they are capable of fulfilling roles previously ignored by governments, or previously realized by families or local groups, in an attempt to mitigate social problems.

Organizational anthropologists may study the relationship between organizations or between an organization and other parts of society., or they can focus on the inner workings of an organization, such as the relationships, hierarchies and cultures formed, and the ways that these elements are transmitted and maintained, transformed, or abandoned over time. Additionally, some anthropology of organizations examines the specific design of organizations and their corresponding strength.

In all manifestations of organizational anthropology, participant observation is critical to understanding the intricacies of the way an organization works and the consequences of actions taken by individuals within it. Simultaneously, anthropology of organizations extends beyond examination of the commonplace involvement of individuals in organizations to discover how and why the organizational principles evolved in the manner that they did. Anthropologists may analyze specific events within an institution, perform semiotic investigations, or analyze the mechanisms by which knowledge and culture are organized and dispersed.

Common considerations taken by anthropologists in studying organizations include the physical location at which a researcher places themselves, as important interactions often take place in private, and the fact that the members of an organization are often being examined in their workplace and may not have much idle time to discuss the details of their everyday endeavors. The ability of individuals to present the workings of an organization in a particular light or frame must additionally be taken into account when using interviews and document analysis to understand an organization, as the involvement of an anthropologist may be met with distrust when information being released to the public is not directly controlled by the organization and could potentially be damaging.
