= Outline of criminal justice =

Overview of and topical guide to criminal justice

The following outline is provided as an overview of and topical guide to criminal justice:

Criminal justice – system of practices and institutions of governments directed at upholding social control, deterring and mitigating crime, or sanctioning those who violate laws with criminal penalties and rehabilitation efforts.

== Parts of the criminal justice system ==
1. Legislative system – network of legislatures that create laws.
2. Judiciary system – network of courts that interpret the law in the name of the state, and carry out the administration of justice in civil, criminal, and administrative matters in accordance with the rule of law.
3. Corrections system – network of governmental agencies that administer a jurisdiction's prisons, probation, and parole systems.

In the 17th century, William Penn began to promote reform in the criminal justice system and helped to see these changes implemented. After the American Revolution, the U.S. Constitution was created which guaranteed freedoms and rights that were never in place in colonial days. This was the starting point to setting guidelines for crimes, punishment and procedures that need to be followed to protect the rights of the innocent. Our modern system of criminal justice is the result of several evolutionary changes that society has undergone since the inception of the United States. Over the years, Americans have developed mechanisms that institute and enforce the rules of society as well as assign responsibility and punish offenders. Today, those functions are carried out by the police, the courts, and corrections. The early beginnings of the criminal justice system in the United States lacked this structure.

In fact, before formal rules, laws, and institutions were established in the United States, Americans relied on religion and sin as a means of shaping society and its behaviors. Many colonial crime codes were defined in biblical terms, making offenses such as profanity, blasphemy, and sacrileges of the Sabbath highly punishable. Punishments such as dunking, stoning, and whipping were designed to humiliate the offender and ultimately lead towards their repentance. Ironically, we still see this desire to make offenders remorseful for their criminal acts but more so for the victims of crime than to a higher power.

== Crime ==
Crime –

- Organized crime –

"ongoing conspiratorial enterprise engaged in illicit activities as a means of generating income (as black money). Structured like a business into a pyramid shaped hierarchy, it freely employs violence and bribery to maintain its operations, threats of grievous retribution (including murder) to maintain internal and external control, and thuggery and contribution to election campaigns to buy political patronage for immunity from exposure and prosecution. Its activities include credit card fraud, gun running, illegal gambling, insurance fraud, kidnapping for ransom, narcotics trade, pornography, prostitution, racketeering, smuggling, vehicle theft, etc."

  - Mafia –

a hierarchically structured secret organization allegedly engaged in smuggling, racketeering, trafficking in narcotics, and other criminal activities in the U.S., Italy, and elsewhere.

- Violence –

the use of physical force to harm someone, to damage property, etc.

great destructive force or energy

=== Crimes ===
- Larceny –

the wrongful taking and carrying away of the personal goods of another from his or her possession with intent to convert them to the taker's own use. larceny. (n.d.). Dictionary.com Unabridged. Retrieved February 14, 2016 from Dictionary.com website http://dictionary.reference.com/browse/larceny

- Trespass –

an unlawful act causing injury to the person, property, or rights of another, committed with force or violence, actual or implied. a wrongful entry upon the lands of another. the action to recover damages for such an injury. trespass. (n.d.). Dictionary.com Unabridged. Retrieved February 13, 2016 from Dictionary.com website http://dictionary.reference.com/browse/trespass

==== Misdemeanors ====
Misdemeanor – a criminal offense defined as less serious than a felony. an instance of misbehavior; misdeed. misdemeanor. (n.d.). Dictionary.com Unabridged. Retrieved February 13, 2016 from Dictionary.com website http://dictionary.reference.com/browse/misdemeanor

==== Felonies ====
A felony is a serious crime punishable by imprisonment for more than a year or by death.

- Arson – intentional setting of fire to property, especially with criminal or fraudulent intent.
- Assault – attempt to attack or threaten to attack and inflict bodily injury on another person.
- Burglary – breaking and entering into a building or structure with the intent to commit a felony.
- Elder abuse – intentional or negligent act that causes physical, emotional, or financial harm to an elderly person.
- Embezzlement – fraudulent appropriation or theft of money or property by someone entrusted with its care for his/her own use.
- Entrapment – Inducing someone to commit a crime they would not otherwise have committed, in order to prosecute the person for it.
- Espionage – spying on a foreign country or an enemy.
- Forgery – creating a false document or fraudulently altering a document.
- Hate crime –(also called Bias Crime) crime motivated by prejudice against a member of a group, based on color, creed, race, gender, religion or sexual orientation.
- Kidnapping – unlawfully seize, carry away and detain a person by force or deception, often with a demand for ransom.
- Murder – unlawful and unjustifiable killing of another person.
- Perjury – Lying or omitting important information under oath or vow.
- Prostitution – offering sexual acts for money.
- Rape – unlawful sexual activity, usually sexual intercourse, with a person without their consent and against their will, carried out forcibly or under threat of injury.
- Robbery – an unlawful taking of money, property, or anything of value from a person or location by using force, violence, or the threat of force.
- Shoplifting –
- Terrorism – the use or threat of violence, intimidation, or coercion—typically targeting civilians, victims or non-combatants—to advance political, religious, racial, or ideological goals.
- Theft –
- Treason – the crime of showing disloyalty, betraying one's country or sovereign, or attacking a state authority to which one owes allegiance.
- War crime – serious violation of international humanitarian law (the laws and customs of war) that occurs during an armed conflict and carries individual criminal responsibility.

== General concepts in criminal justice ==
- Abuse defense –
- Actus reus – the physical act of a crime, as opposed to mens rea, the criminal intent.
- Administrative law –
- Affray –
- Arraignment –
- Arrest warrant –
- Attendant circumstances –
- Bail –
- Booking –
- Case law –
- Causation –
- Chain of custody –
- Citizen's arrest –
- civil law –
- Clearance rate –
- Common law –
- Concurrence –
- Concurrent sentence –
- Conflict model –
- Consecutive sentence –
- Command responsibility –
- Consensus model –
- Corpus delicti –
- Corrections –
- Creative lawyering –
- Crime –
- Crime control –
- Crime index –
- Criminal justice –
- Criminology –
- Death penalty –
- Defense (legal) –
- Defense of property –
- Denial of a speedy trial –
- Deterrence –
- Diminished responsibility –
- Diminished responsibility in English law –
- Double jeopardy –
- Due process –
- Evidentiary hearing –
- Excuse –
- Execution warrant –
- Grand jury –
- Ignorance of the law –
- Inchoate offense –
- Indictable offence –
- Indictment –
- Individual rights –
- Infraction –
- Innovative defense –
- Insanity defense –
- Islamic law –
- Jurisprudence –
- Jury instructions –
- Jury nullification –
- Jury trial –
- Justice –
- Justification –
- Kangaroo court –
- Law –
- Liability –
- Manslaughter –
- Manslaughter in English law –
- M'Naghten Rules –
- * Mens rea – the criminal intent or the mental element of a crime.
- Miranda Warning – In U.S. law, a statement informing a person of their legal Miranda rights (to have an attorney and to refuse to answer questions) upon arrest.
- Mistake –
- Motive –
- Motor vehicle theft –
- Murder in English law –
- Negligence –
- Obscenity –
- Offense –
- Pardon –
- Penal law –
- Peremptory pleas –
- Plea bargain –
- Precedent –
- Predator –
- Preliminary hearing –
- Prescription –
- Prison reform –
- Probable cause –
- Probation –
- Procedural defense –
- Prosecutorial misconduct –
- Provocation –
- Provocation in English law –
- Public order –
- Recidivism –
- Resisting unlawful arrest –
- Restorative justice –
- Selective prosecution –
- Self defense and defense of others –
- Sentence –
- Sharia –
- Social control –
- * Stare decisis –
- Star Chamber –
- Statutory law –
- Suicide –
- Summary offence –
- Trial –
- Trial by jury –
- Trial de novo –
- Warrant –
- Writ –
- Writ of Habeas Corpus –

== See also ==
- List of criminal justice notables
