= Mugging =

Form of robbery

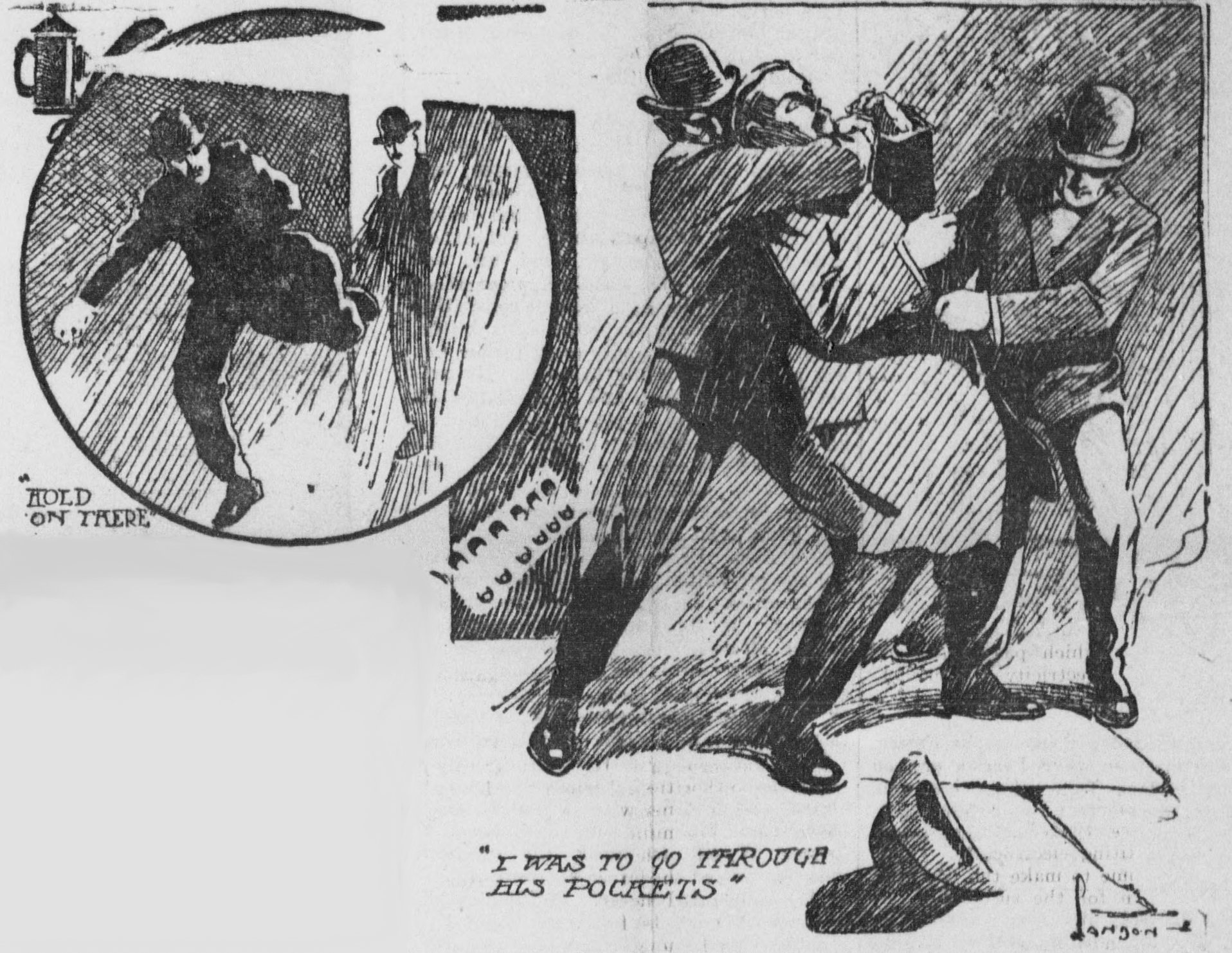
1904 newspaper illustration of a mugging, described as a "hold-up"

Mugging (sometimes called personal robbery or street robbery) is a form of robbery and street crime that occurs in public places, often urban areas at night. It involves a confrontation with a threat of violence. Muggers steal money or personal property, which is worth less than the payouts of commercial robbery but involves less time and planning. They may be motivated by money, cultural capital, or the thrill of the act. The risk of property loss, injury, or psychological trauma causes people to fear becoming victims of mugging.

The concept of mugging originated in 1940s United States, when blackouts of World War II enabled committing crimes in the dark. It soon became the subject of anti-Black racism. In the United Kingdom, a media wave about mugging occurred in the 1970s, before which the concept had not been applied to British crimes. Police departments created "anti-mugging" units. The crime was often committed by West Indian youths, and there were widespread racial stereotypes associating it with Black people. Some leftist criminologists said that the media inaccurately reported a crime wave of mugging, including Stuart Hall, who called it a moral panic. Political debate of mugging in the country peaked in the 1980s. In the 1990s, Brazilian media reported a mass mugging phenomenon known as arrastão, a term later used in Portugal.

== Etymology and terminology ==
The word mug had several definitions in the nineteenth century. The noun mugger had been used since the eighteenth century to refer to earthenware sellers before a semantic shift toward referring to thieves. The Dictionary of Americanisms documented the thief-related usage of the word among inmates at Confederate prisons in the American Civil War. The modern usage—referring to robbery against an individual, often by a group—originated in the 1940s among criminals and police. The noun mugging and the verb mug entered British English from American English, becoming a buzzword in late 1972 and early 1973.

Mugging is a common term for personal robbery, though personal robbery also encompasses forms of theft such as carjacking. Other terms for personal robbery include snatch theft and street robbery, as it is an example of a street crime. The terms mugging, street robbery, and street crime are often interchangeable, though usage varies.

== Description ==
Mugging is a form of robbery. Mugging itself is generally not a criminal offense; perpetrators of the act commit the crime of robbery, though mugging is a more specific concept. Unlike other forms of robbery, mugging is a personal offense. It typically involves less planning and smaller payouts than commercial robbery, and it is usually committed by inexperienced criminals who rely on fear.

Mugging often involves an attack on a victim walking alone at night. Perpetrators steal money or valuable personal property such as cell phones. Actual or threatened violence is a major aspect of mugging, which often uses weapons such as knives. The level of violence can vary, with some muggings resulting in injury or death. The level of violence and the emotional response contribute to a victim's level of crisis. Victims often face loss of property, injury, or fear, and they may gain psychological trauma. The possibility of such outcomes results in a widespread fear of mugging.

Motives for mugging include need for money, desire to increase social status, and the thrill of the act. The latter two motives are common among younger people, while the need for money often motivates habitual drug users to commit street robbery. Though mugging takes more time than other crimes and brings little money, perpetrators are motivated by a feeling of power. Compared to commercial robbery, street robbery is a more reliable source of money due to its speed, simplicity, and low punishment rate; this is motivating for people who lack legitimate sources of money. Muggers are often motivated by peer pressure, which normalizes the behavior. People involved in street gangs gain cultural capital from it.

Street robbery usually occurs in urban areas. It is often associated with night, though it frequently occurs at other times of day. Muggers usually work within small, familiar areas, such as the surroundings of their homes. Street robberies occur within a few city blocks of places that are likely to have cash, like stores, bars, illegal businesses, or ATMs. Incidents are often clustered at points within cities such as bus stops. Many incidents occur in places with activity in the night-time economy; such cases frequently involve alcohol intoxication or violence. Street robbers sometimes target other criminals opportunistically; such cases are less commonly reported to police.

A mugging typically lasts a few minutes. It begins with the perpetrator assessing the risk of conducting the act. Muggers select victims whom they perceive as vulnerable or likely to have money. They may initiate a confrontation by feigning a non-threatening encounter. The confrontation occurs in a short range, enabling personal contact, such as shoving, that may surprise the victim. The perpetrator may display weapons or implicitly threaten violence. They attempt to take control of the victim, which creates an unpredictable situation for both parties based on their perceptions of each other. Though muggers usually do not desire to induce violence, confrontations often become violent when they lose control or perceive resistance.

== History ==
=== Origins ===
The concept of mugging originated in the United States in the 1940s. Blackouts during World War II enabled people to commit crimes in the dark, inciting the popularity of muggings in cities such as Baltimore. Mugging narratives were racialized since the origin of the concept, and, in the post-war era, media in New York City associated mugging with the Black population. African-American communist politician Benjamin J. Davis Jr. described such reports as "exaggerated crime wave slander", and the journal Phylon wrote that conservative media aimed to "create a Negro crime wave".

=== 1970s British phenomenon ===
The term mugging was first used in British media in the 1960s. The media frequently reported waves of muggings from 1972 to 1976, a time when the concept of fear of crime gained recognition. Prior to this era, the British public had considered mugging to be limited to American cities. Commentators of the time compared ethnic tensions in British cities to those in America, and the association of mugging with the criminal stereotype of African Americans spread to Britain. Similar crimes in Britain had previously been called "robbery with violence", "assault and robbery", "robbery and grievous bodily harm", or "bag snatching". Such crimes had been increasingly reported starting in the mid-1960s, and many newspapers reported police statistics saying that London's mugging rate increased 129% between 1968 and 1972. During this time, urban residents gained awareness of the risk of victimization, especially in middle-class neighborhoods whose residents had not expected crime.

In the late 1960s and early 1970s, many muggers were West Indian youths, largely due to socioeconomic discontent. Police departments strengthened crime control measures. Some, including London's Metropolitan Police and London Transport Police, utilized "anti-mugging" units, which primarily focused on West Indian–majority neighborhoods. Police associated the crime with West Indians, despite high rates of mugging in some cities with low Black populations and a 1976 Metropolitan Police report to the Home Affairs Select Committee that said crime rates of West Indians were the same as the general population. Muggings received disproportionate media attention compared to other crimes that occurred in White-majority areas. Television reports frequently featured elderly women who were victims of mugging, and this demographic gained a widespread fear of the crime, though men were more likely to be victims.

A mugging case in Handsworth, West Midlands, on November 5, 1972, resulted in three teenagers being sentenced to twenty years of prison and received widespread newspaper coverage. A column by commentator John Akass in The Sun, a widely circulated tabloid newspaper, wrote that the case's perpetrator "did not get 20 years for mugging. He got it for attempted murder," and that the punishment was "almost as barbarous as the crime itself". The fatal stabbing of an elderly man, soon after the Handsworth case, was the first individual crime in Britain to be reported with the word mugging. Some leftist criminologists believed that the widespread attention to mugging was a result of the media rather than circumstances contributing to crime. However, Jock Young said in 1976, "It is unrealistic to suggest that the problem of crime like mugging is merely the problem of mis-categorization and concomitant moral panics." In the late 1970s, public opinion largely associated mugging with Black people. Politician Enoch Powell referred to mugging as a "black crime" in 1976. A 1979 study found that two types of crime were disproportionately associated with black youths: mugging and being suspicious.

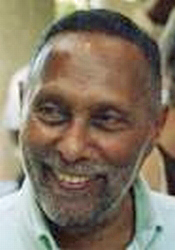
Stuart Hall described mugging as a moral panic.

The 1978 book Policing the Crisis, cowritten by Stuart Hall, labeled the phenomenon as a moral panic and argued that the media ideologically conceptualized mugging. The book said that mugging was not defined in law or distinct from existing crimes, but that the concept was influenced by preexisting societal concerns and anti-Black sentiment, as well as by the connotations of the word mugging in America. It argued that political and media figures used mugging to direct public fears about public disorder toward Black youths, that the government used this attitude to secure support, and that media coverage of the Handsworth case exemplified the undue attention to the subject. The book disagreed with the belief that the crime rate was increasing; some critics, including Nob Doran and P. A. J. Waddington, said that its use of statistics was biased. Unlike Hall, Michael Pratt stated that London's rate of mugging was increasing and that the Metropolitan Police's had a legal classification equivalent to mugging. Colin Sumner challenged the description of mugging as a moral panic, saying that media statements did not equate to public opinion.

Discussion of mugging in the British Parliament increased through the 1960s and 1970s (alongside that of burglary) and peaked in the 1980s. By that time, riots, rather than muggings, were the subject of racialized media coverage. A survey by the Home Office, published in March 1982, recommended community policing to resist mugging and criticized excessive media response, but its findings received little attention. Public fear of mugging peaked in the 1990s and was most prevalent among people who grew up during the era of the media phenomenon.

=== 1990s–2020s ===
Brazilian media in the 1990s reported a phenomenon of mass mugging and organized crime, termed arrastão (lit. 'dragnet'). The term was coined for 1992 reports of mass muggings on beaches in the wealthy southern region of Rio de Janeiro. The only injury of these incidents was caused by a police officer, and only two muggings were reported, but many people believed there was a high rate of unreported muggings. Newspapers associated the arrastão with youths, particularly of the funkeiro subculture, fans of the African-American funk music genre. According to anthropologist Ben Penglase, this media wave was similar to the racist reports of mugging in 1980s Britain, despite not explicitly mentioning race. In Portugal, a twelve-day media wave about mass mugging began after a report by Lusa News Agency on June 10, 2005, about crime at Carcavelos Beach. Media reports used the word arrastão, though police said there was no evidence of it. Most national news outlets and many politicians framed it as a mass mugging. Reporters gave more attention to unrelated acts, mostly by racial minorities, to support a mass mugging wave.

In the 2000s, conservatives in the United States used the thesis, "A liberal is someone who has not been mugged," in support of a law and order ideology, though being a victim of crimes such as mugging was not correlated with conservatism. American media in the late 2000s frequently reported accounts of "payday muggings", which supposed that Mexican Americans, who were thought to be likely to be undocumented and lack resources, were targeted by primarily Black muggers.

Rates of personal robbery decreased during the COVID-19 pandemic in the United Kingdom as there was less night-time economic activity.

== Statistics ==
About 2% of crimes recorded in England and Wales in the 2000s and 2010s are personal robberies. About one-third of personal robberies in the United Kingdom involve weapons, and about 40% of victims are injured. Most perpetrators in the United Kingdom are groups of young men, and most victims are men. In the country, fear of mugging is more prevalent among people who have been victims of it, as well as people who are women, non-white, lower-income, lower-educated, or unemployed, as of 2019.

Mugging is less frequent in Canada than the United States, as of 2005. In Norway, mugging is rare outside of criminal circles, but incidents are commonly reported in the media.
