= Criminal stereotype of African Americans =

Ethnic stereotype

African Americans, and African American males in particular, have an ethnic stereotype in which they are portrayed as dangerous criminals. This stereotype is associated with the fact that African Americans are proportionally over-represented in the numbers of those that are arrested and convicted for committing crimes. It has appeared frequently in American popular culture, reinforcing the negative consequences of systemic racism.

== History ==
The criminalization of black males has a long history in the US, which includes both legal and informal social laws that can lead to death or incarceration. Three sociohistorical threats to black male identities that speak to principles of race consciousness, primacy of racialization, and ordinariness of racism. First, the prison industrial complex created the convict lease system. This involved arresting many of the recently freed men and women for minor violations and punishing them with hefty fines, long prison sentences, and working on former slave plantations.

The second threat to black males was socially sanctioned lynchings. Lynchings were systematically used to intimidate and control the black community, as well as position black people as social problems. They also were one way that black male deaths were deemed as "justifiable homicides". Of the more than 4700 people lynched between 1881 and 1968, 72% were black. Their deaths, which occurred by being burned, shot, hanged, castrated, and/or tortured, were often part of public events and documented in scores of photos and postcards. In most incidents, no person was brought to justice for these deaths.

Into the post-civil rights era, the third threat allows police officers to use legal authority to regulate black male bodies through traffic stops, stop and frisk, and zero-tolerance policies. These policies create legal entrapment, which systematically ensnares black males into the criminal justice system. There is a litany of legal cases to support policing activities and practices. Some of these cases give legal authority for police to stop, question, pursue, and arrest individuals without probable cause or the presence of suspicious behaviors, even during minor traffic violations. These cases demonstrate how policing behaviors across the USA are legally structured to produce institutional entrapment that often disproportionately target and affect black males. They also raise the question of civil rights violations and direct racial biases.

According to some scholars, the stereotype of African Americans males as criminals was first constructed as a tool to "discipline" and control slaves during the time of slavery in the United States. For instance, Amii Barnard alleges that out of fear of the fugitive slaves staging a rebellion, slaveholders sought to spread the stereotype that African American males were dangerous criminals who would rape the "innocent" and "pure" white women if they had the opportunity to. A law introduced in Pennsylvania in 1700 illustrates the fear of a dangerous African American man within the slave holding society- it mandated that should a black man attempt to rape a White woman, the perpetrator will be castrated or punished to death.

Carter et al. argues that this criminal stereotype contributed to lynching in the United States that mostly targeted African American males in the south. Ida B. Wells, the well-known anti-lynching activist, published the pamphlet entitled the "Southern Horrors: Lynch Law in All Its Phases" from 1892 to 1920 reporting that contrary to the notion that lynchings occurred because African American males had sexually abused or attacked white women, fewer than 30% of reported lynchings even involved the charge of rape. She also followed up with an editorial that suggested that, most sexual liaisons between black men and white women were consensual and illicit. The criminal stereotype of African Americans as potential rapists at that time is also illustrated in the controversial media portrayal of African American men in the 1915 American epic film, The Birth of a Nation.

According to Marc Mauer however, although African Americans have been consistently stereotyped as "biologically flawed" individuals who have a general tendency towards crime, the depiction of African Americans as criminals became more threatening only in the 1970s and early 1980s- with the evolution of the stereotype of African American males as "petty thieves" to "ominous criminal predators". In the late 1990s, Melissa Hickman Barlow argued that the perception of African American males as criminals was so entrenched in society that she said "talking about crime is talking about race". Between 2005 and 2015, the gap in the incarceration rate between blacks and whites declined while still remaining high. The rate of incarceration for blacks declined -2.0% per year, for Hispanics it declined -2.3% per year, while for whites it declined only -0.1% per year. Blacks today continue to be incarcerated at a rate over 2.1 times Hispanics and 5.6 times whites. The disparity varies widely by state and region.

== Perceptions ==
Katheryn Russell-Brown in her book The Color of Crime: Racial Hoaxes, White Fear, Black Protectionism, Police Harassment and Other Macroaggressions (1998) refers to the stereotype as the "criminal black man", because people associate young black men with crime in American culture. She writes that the black male is portrayed as a "symbolic pillager of all that is good". Russell-Brown refers to the criminal black man as a myth and suggests that the stereotype contributes to "racial hoaxes". She defines these as "when someone fabricates a crime and blames it on another person because of his race, OR when an actual crime has been committed and the perpetrator falsely blames someone because of his race". Stuart Henry and Mark Lanier in What Is Crime?: Controversies Over the Nature of Crime and What to Do about It (2001) refer to the criminal black man as a "mythlike race/gender image of deviance".

Moreover, according to Hugenberg and Bodenhausen in Ambiguity in social categorization: The role of prejudice and facial affect in race categorization, people perceive black faces as angry more often than they perceive white faces as angry. On top of this, angry faces are more commonly categorized as belonging to black people rather than white people. Even what people are wearing can determine what race people classify them as.

=== Perpetuation of negative images by popular culture ===
Linda G. Tucker in Lockstep and Dance: Images of black Men in Popular Culture (2007) argues that the representations in popular culture of criminal African American men help perpetuate the image. She writes that the portrayal of crime by conservative politicians during heated campaigns is used as a metaphor for race: they have recast fears about race as fears about crime. For instance, Republican opponents of Dukakis used the case of Willie Horton to attack the Democrat's stand on law enforcement, suggesting that people would be safer if led by Republicans. She says that such politicians used Horton as a collective symbol of African American male criminality. Some argue that the ad Republicans used of an intimidating-looking mug shot of murderer Willie Horton created fear in white Americans minds. The message was clear: African Americans are violent and should not have prison furloughs or rehabilitation. This led to the victory of Republican George H.W. Bush.

The criminal African American man appears often in the context of athletics and sports. Arthur A. Raney and Jennings Bryant discuss this in Handbook of Sports and Media (2006). They cite Beyond the Cheers: Race as Spectacle in College Sport (2001) by C. Richard King and Charles Fruehling Springwood, which examines the connection between race, crime, and sports. They study the ways in which "criminality indelibly marks the African American athlete". Raney and Bryant says coverage and reception of accusations of crimes by sportspeople differed depending on the race of the individual.

John Milton Hoberman in Darwin's Athletes: How Sport Has Damaged black America and Preserved the Myth of Race (1997) blames entertainment and advertising industries for propagating the negative stereotypes, namely, for "the merger of the athlete, the gangster rapper, and the criminal into a single black male persona ... into the predominant image of black masculinity in the United States and around the world", which has harmed racial integration.

A number of studies have concluded that the news systematically portrays black Americans as criminals and whites as victims of the crime. For example, a study found that in news programs broadcast in the Los Angeles area, blacks were overly represented as perpetrators of crime and underrepresented as victims of crimes on television news, compared to actual crime statistics. This is in stark contrast to how, compared to actual crime statistics, whites were found to be underrepresented as perpetrators and overrepresented as victims of crime in television news stories.

The media is viewed as a source of social learning that essentially teaches, reinforces, and cultivates certain ideas about Blacks. A study examining the news reports from The New York Times, The Washington Post, The Wall Street Journal and USA Today covering the effects of Hurricane Katrina showed that in 80% of the captions for photographs where the word "looting" was used to describe the actions of the evacuees pictured, the photos showed Black evacuees, suggesting that the Black evacuees were criminals. By contrast, similar images of white people were often captioned without explicitly judgemental words, instead using phrases such as "finding food."

According to Sanders in Category inclusion and exclusion in perceptions of African Americans: Using the Stereotype Content Model to Examine Perceptions of groups and individuals, African Americans on television and in movies are most likely to play roles related to crime, sports, and entertainment stories rather than roles in which they make a valuable contribution to the nation. This omission of positive traits in African Americans on television has a powerful effect on viewers. Sanders refers to this as "stereotyping by omission". It is very common for African Americans to be portrayed as threatening and violent gang members criminals and drug dealers.

=== Police killing black males ===
Keon L. Gilbert and Rashawn Ray in Why Police Kill Black Males with Impunity: Applying Public Health Critical Race Praxis to Address the Determinants of Policing Behaviors and "Justifiable" Homicide in the USA examine trends from 1960 to 2010 of death by legal intervention by race and social class and determine that high-income blacks are just as likely to be killed by police officers as low-income blacks. However, it has been reported that black cops were found to be more likely to kill black civilians at the same rate as white cops were.

== Consequences ==
There is evidence that the American society has internalized the criminal stereotype of African Americans. For example, in experiments where African American and white individuals perform the same act, respondents have reported that the black figure is more threatening than the white figure. Likewise, in surveys asking about fear of strangers in hypothetical situations, respondents are more fearful of being victimized by black strangers than by white strangers. According to a 1997 study, African Americans convicted of violent crimes were systematically judged to deserve sentences.

In other research, whites have been found to overestimate the differences between the rates at which whites and blacks commit some crimes. Dixon states that heavy television viewing increases exposure to the overrepresentation of Blacks as criminals, when making race and crime judgements. Furthermore, one of the findings is that exposure to Blacks' overrepresentation as criminals was positively related to perception of Blacks as violent. A 2012 study found that white Americans overestimated the percent of burglaries, illegal drug sales, and juvenile crimes committed by blacks by between 6.6 and 9.5 percentage points.

There is also some research suggesting that blacks have also internalized the criminal stereotype. According to a study, 82% of blacks think they are perceived as violent by Whites. African Americans are also more likely than Whites to think that racial profiling is widespread and to think they are treated unfairly by police, both in general and in actual criminal justice encounters.

Public defender James Williams and sociologist Becky Pettit, both advocating for decarceration in the United States, have argued that the treatment of African Americans by law enforcement agencies is "the most pervasive blight on the criminal justice system today" and that African American progress is a myth, as it does not take into consideration the African American men who are incarcerated.

=== Consequences in the justice system ===
Many psychologists argue that the cultural stereotype of black criminality can have an unconscious but substantial influence on the way that "people perceive individuals, process information, and form judgments". For example, the criminal stereotype of African Americans could contribute to the reason behind why blacks are disproportionately more likely than Whites to be targeted by the police as suspects, interrogated and wrongfully convicted. The stereotype of a criminal African American has also been associated with racial profiling.

In addition, a report from the U.S. Sentencing Commission stated that the sentences of black men were on average 19.5% longer than the sentences of white men from December 2007 to September 2011. Although the report did not attribute racism to the difference in sentencing decisions, the report did write that the judges "make sentencing decisions based on many legitimate considerations that are not or cannot be measured." Another similar study examining 58,000 federal criminal cases concluded that African-Americans' jail time was almost 60% longer than white sentences while black men were on average more than twice as likely to face a mandatory minimum charge as white men were, even after taking into account arrest offense, age and location. Some scholars say this discrepancy is due to them being repeat offenders, while others state that this is partially due to prosecutors over-charging African American defendants in contrast to white defendants. Supporting the latter claim, in mock trials that experimentally manipulate the race of the defendant, respondents have been found to give African-American defendants harsher judgments of guilt and punishment than white defendants in otherwise identical cases. Similarly, Giliam found that exposure to African American rather than White suspects led to increased support for capital punishment and the three-strikes legislation.

Joseph Rand also suggests that when black witnesses are on trial with white jurors, they are more likely to feel stereotype threat and are more likely to appear less credible. To elaborate, because black witnesses are aware of the stereotype relating them as criminals, they are more motivated to control their behavior to counter stereotypes and appear truthful. However, because they try so hard to appear credible, they appear more anxious and unnatural, and therefore less credible to jurors.

=== Social consequences ===
Lincoln and Devah argue that the criminal stereotype of African American males can explain the growing racial segregation in the United States. Specifically, they found that the percentage of young black men in a neighborhood is correlated with the respondent's perceptions of neighborhood crime level, even after taking into account measures of actual crime rates and other neighborhood characteristics. This could explain why other races avoid areas with many black men, as the area is perceived to be dangerous.

Another study found that after priming the "black criminal" stereotype among respondents (by exposing them to photographs of blacks appearing to plunder after Hurricane Katrina), the respondents reduced policy support for black evacuees-in-need but did not influence responses towards white evacuees-in-need.

Jelani Kerr, Peter Schafer, Armon Perry, Julia Orkin, Maxine Vance, and Patricia O'Campo in The Impact of Racial Discrimination on African American Fathers' Intimate Relationships, mentions that African American have a lower marriage rate and a lower relationship quality compared to whites. The relationship between socioeconomic factors and experiences of racial discrimination and the extent to which racial discrimination, financial stress, and perceived stress are associated with marital status and intimate relationship quality for African American fathers. Aside from socioeconomic factors and experiences of racial discrimination, education was also positively associated with racial discrimination and the relation to the relationship negatively associates with perceived stress and racial discrimination.

=== Health consequences ===
African American men who have sex with men and women are among those heavily impacted by HIV in the United States. And those of them who have history of incarceration are at further risk of infection, including people who are in an intimate relationship with them. According to Maria R. Khan, Nabila El-Bassel, Carol E. Golin, Joy D. Scheidell, Adaora A. Admimora, Ashley M. Coatsworth, Hui Hu, Selena Judon-Monk, Katie P. Median, and David A. Wohl in The Committed Intimate Partnerships of Incarcerated African American Men: Implications for Sexual HIV Transmission Risk and Prevention Opportunities sat that HIV incidence in African American men is seven times higher that of white men and twice that of Latino men.

== Statistics ==
Nearly one in three (32%) black males in the age group of 20-29 is under some form of correctional control, such as incarceration, probation or parole. As of 1995, one in fourteen adult black males was incarcerated in prison or jail on any given day, representing a doubling of this rate from 1985. Furthermore, a black male born in 1991 has a 29 percent chance of spending time in prison at some point in his life. A study found that in 1979, 80% of the racial disparity in prison populations was accounted for by African Americans committing more crime, but by 2008, another study by Michael Tonry and Matthew Melewski found that this percentage had decreased to 61%.

Patrick Sharkey and Michael Friedson estimated that the decline in homicides led to a 0.80-year increase in life expectancy at birth for African American males, and reduced years of potential life lost by 1,156 years for every 100,000 African American males.

According to official FBI statistics, in 2015, 51.1% of people arrested for homicide were African American, even though African American people account only for 13.4% of the total United States population.

=== Incarceration for drug related crimes ===
For drug related offenses, from 1965 through the early 1980s, African Americans were approximately twice as likely as whites to be arrested. However, with the war on drugs in the 1970s, African American arrest rates skyrocketed, while white arrest rates increased only slightly. By the end of the 1980s, African Americans were more than five times more likely than whites to be arrested for drug-related offenses. In 1993, criminologist Alfred Blumstein argued that as national self-report data showed that drug use was actually declining among both African Americans and Whites, it is highly unlikely that these race differences in arrest rates represent "real" patterns of drug use. Instead, these crime statistics reflect the government's targeting of only specific types of drug use and trafficking. Although the "black drug user" stereotype is heavily associated with young African Americans, a 2011 survey using self-reported data found African American young people less likely to use illegal drugs than other racial groups in the U.S. According to Michelle Alexander, the disproportionate mass incarceration of African Americans in drug-related offenses is caused by racial bias within the criminal justice system, terming this phenomenon as "The New Jim Crow", in a book of the same name. Alexander claims that racial beliefs and stereotypes as a direct result of a media saturated with images of black criminals have obviously and predictably created a sharp disparity in the rates at which blacks and whites are subject to encounters with law enforcement.

Female jail time

According to the Bureau of Justice Statistics, the number of women in state prisons increased by 75% between 1986 and 1991. For black non-Hispanic women, the number of incarcerations for drug offenses went up by 828%, which is higher than any other group of people. From 1985 to 1997, the rate of white women in prisons and jails went up from 27 per 100,000 to 76 per 100,000. However, the rate of black women in prisons and jails went up from 183 per 100,000 to 491 per 100,000. (Bureau of Justice Statistics, 2000). According to Lubiano, the media portrays these African American women as "welfare queens" who are responsible for the crack trade. These women are blamed for creating a new generation of drug users. Some have even re-termed the phrase "war on drugs" to "war on black women".

=== Statistics and self-reporting ===
Scholars have argued that these official arrest statistics do not fully reflect actual criminal behavior as the criminal stereotype that African Americans hold influences the decisions to make arrests. Specifically, because the stereotype of African American is pervasive and embedded in society, police officers unconsciously believe that African Americans are dangerous and are therefore more likely to arrest African Americans.

Instead, self-reporting crime statistics have been used to overcome the criticism that the official arrest statistics are biased. Many studies found little or no differences in self-reported offending among juveniles of different racial and ethnic group, with some scholars suggesting that institutionalized racism within the criminal justice system is the cause for the disproportionate arrest rates of African Americans. However, Hindelang found that black males were least likely to self-report offenses recorded by the police, with 33 percent of total offenses and 57 percent of serious offenses known to police not being self-reported by African American males, suggesting some caution in concluding that self reported crime statistics accurately portray the actual rate of crime behavior.

== Situation in other countries ==
The criminal stereotype of black individuals is not just limited to the United States. One study administered a survey to Canadians showed that they believed African Canadians are more likely to commit crime, with nearly half of the respondents believing that 65% of black people committed more crimes than other racial groups in Canada. A working group of human rights experts from the United Nations has also expressed concerns that anti-African Canadian systemic racism is rampant in the Canadian justice system, especially in the arbitrary use of racial profiling.

Rahier argues that Afro-Ecuadorians have been consistently stereotyped to be dangerous criminals in the popular and widely circulated magazine Vistazo, since the late 1950s. Similarly, he also argues that when race is mentioned in reporting of a crime in Ecuador's daily newspapers, the criminal was always black and the victim was always not black.

== See also ==
- African-American organized crime
- Afrophobia
- Crime in the United States
- Race and crime in the United States
- Race and the war on drugs
- Race in the United States criminal justice system
- Racial bias in criminal news in the United States
- Racial profiling in the United States
- Racism against African Americans
- Racism in the United States
- Stereotypes of African Americans
- Stereotypes of groups within the United States

== Sources ==
- Alexander, Michelle (2012). The New Jim Crow: Mass Incarceration in the Age of Colorblindness. The New Press. ISBN 978-1-59558-643-8.
- Russell-Brown, Katheryn (1998). The Color of Crime: Racial Hoaxes, White Fear, Black Protectionism, Police Harassment, and Other Macroaggressions. NYU Press. ISBN 978-0-8147-7471-7.
- Quillian, Lincoln; Pager, Devah (November 2001). "Black Neighbors, Higher Crime? The Role of Racial Stereotypes in Evaluations of Neighborhood Crime". American Journal of Sociology. 107 (3): 717–767. doi:10.1086/338938. S2CID 19532049.
- Rome, Dennis (2004). black Demons: The Media's Depiction of the African American Male Criminal Stereotype. Greenwood Publishing Group. ISBN 0-275-97244-5.
- Tucker, Linda G. (2007). Lockstep and Dance: Images of Black Men in Popular Culture. University Press of Mississippi. ISBN 978-1-57806-906-4.
- Welch, Kelly (August 2007). "Black Criminal Stereotypes and Racial Profiling". Journal of Contemporary Criminal Justice. 23 (3): 276–288. doi:10.1177/1043986207306870. S2CID 146764775.
- Marsh, Ian; Melville, Gaynor. (2009). Crime, Justice and the Media. Taylor & Francis. ISBN 978-0-415-44490-3.
