= List of U.S. criminal justice academics =

The following is a list of notable academics within the field of criminal justice in the United States.

== Criminal justice academics ==
Persons notable for accomplishments in the field of criminal justice

- George J. Beto – criminal justice expert
- Michael T. Cahill – Dean of Brooklyn Law School
- John J. DiIulio, Jr.
- James Alan Fox – professor of criminology at Northeastern University in Boston, Massachusetts
- Sanford Kadish
- Gary LaFree
- Coramae Richey Mann – professor emeritus of criminal justice at the University of Illinois at Chicago
- Katheryn K. Russell – professor of law and director of the Center for the Study of Race and Race Relations at University of Florida's Fredric G. Levin College of Law
- Louis B. Schwartz (1913-2003), law professor at the University of Pennsylvania Law School
- Frank Schmalleger – director of the Justice Research Association
- Jerome Herbert Skolnick – professor at New York University and a former president of the American Society of Criminology
- August Vollmer – leading figure in the development of the field of criminal justice in the United States in the early 20th century; first police chief of Berkeley, California
- James Q. Wilson – academic political scientist and an authority on public administration
- Orlando W. Wilson
- Nancy La Vigne - criminologist, current dean of the Rutgers School of Criminal Justice

Persons notable for accomplishments outside criminal justice

- Joe Biden – notable primarily for his political career
- Lani Guiner – notable for her scholarship in civil rights
