= The Color of Crime =

The Color of Crime may refer to:

- The Color of Crime (1998 book), a book by Katheryn Russell-Brown
- The Color of Crime (New Century), a study by the New Century Foundation
