= Lee E. Ross =

- Born: Tuskegee, Alabama
- Education: PhD in Criminology
- Alma mater: Rutgers University: The Graduate School of Criminal Justice
- Occupations: Professor of Criminology and Criminal Justice Administration
- Writing career
- Language: English
- Genre: Criminology/Criminal Justice
- Notable works: Domestic Violence and the Criminal Justice System

Lee E. Ross is an African-American criminologist and author of articles and books that address issues of domestic violence and topics related to race, crime, and justice.

== Life ==
Ross was born in Tuskegee, Alabama, but his parents eventually relocated to Hempstead, New York. Upon graduating Hempstead High School, he attended Niagara University in Niagara Falls, New York. There, he earned a bachelor's degree in criminal justice before receiving the Patricia Roberts Harris Fellowship to pursue graduate studies at Rutgers University where he earned his masters and doctorate in criminology. Ross also spent seven years as a federal law enforcement officer with the United States Customs Service. He has held various academic positions, including teaching at the University of Wisconsin–Milwaukee and the University of Wisconsin-Parkside (where he served as Department Chair) prior to his current position at the University of Central Florida.

Ross is editor of Continuing the War Against Domestic Violence, 2nd Edition. He is a member of the Academy of Criminal Justice Sciences and the European Society of Criminology. He has received academic awards for teaching excellence and research, including the COHPA Research Fellow award and the Outstanding Mentor of the Year Award from the Academy of Criminal Justice Sciences. In 1998, his book African-American Criminologists, 1970-1996: An Annotated Bibliography was the first of it kind to document the scholarly contributions of African-American criminologists to the field of criminal justice, and was described as "the most complete index to the work of Black criminologists" by Katheryn Russell-Brown.

== Selected bibliography ==
- Ross, Lee E. (2025). Domestic Violence and Criminal Justice, Second Edition. Routledge Publications. 250 pages.
- Ross, Lee E. (2024). Cultural Diversity and the Administration of Justice. Cognella Publishing. 130 pages..
- Ross, Lee E. (2022). Musical Lyrics and Domestic Violence: The Soundtracks of Our Lives.
- Kendall Hunt. 251 pages.
- Ross, Lee E. (Editor) 2020. Readings in Cultural Diversity and Criminal Justice. (Cognella Academic Publishing). 300 pages.
- Ross, Lee E. (2018). Domestic Violence and Criminal Justice. Boca Raton: Routledge Publishing (Taylor & Francis Group), 212 pages.
- Ross, L.E. (2014). Continuing the War Against Domestic Violence. Boca Raton, FL: CRC Press.
- Ross, L.E. and Leslie, T. (2104). Criminal Justice Practitioner Attitudes Toward Domestic Violence: Another Day in Paradise, Law Enforcement Executive Forum, 14, 3:18-31.
- Ross, Lee E. (2014). The Prison Industrial Complex., In B. Arrigo, (Ed). Encyclopedia of Criminal Justice Ethics, Thousand Oaks, CA: Sage Publications.
- Ross, Lee E. (2013). Religion and Intimate Partner Violence: A Double-Edge Sword. The Catalyst: A Social Justice Forum. 2, 3:3-12.
- Ross, Lee E. (2010). A Vision of Race, Crime, and Justice through the Lens of Critical Race Theory. In E. McLaughlin and T. Newburn (Eds.), The Sage Handbook of Criminological Theory. London: Sage Publications. (pp. 391–409).
- Ross, Lee E. (2008). Criminal Justice Pioneers: A content Analysis of Biographical Data. Journal of Criminal Justice, 36, 2:182-189.
- Ross, Lee E. (2007). Consequences of Mandatory Arrest Policies: Comments, Questions, and Concerns, Law Enforcement Executive Forum. 7, 5:73-85.
- Ross, L. E. & Elechi, O. (2002). Student Attitudes Towards Internship Experience: From Theory and Practice, Journal of Criminal Justice Education.13 (2): 297-312.
- Palermo, G. & Ross, L. E. (1999). Mass Murder, Suicide, and Moral Development: Can we Separate the Adults from the Juveniles? International Journal of Offender Therapy and Comparative Criminology. 43(1), 8-20
- Ross, Lee E., (1998) African American Criminologists: 1970-1996, Westport: Greenwood Publications.
- Ross, L. E. & Edwards, W. J. (1998). Publishing Among African American Criminologists: A Devaluing Experience? Journal of Criminal Justice vol. 26(1): 29-40.
- Ross, Lee E. 1994. Religion and Deviance: Exploring the Impact of Social Control Elements, Sociological Spectrum, 14 (1): 65-86
- Ross, Lee E. 1992. Blacks, Self-Esteem, and Delinquency: It's Time for a New Approach, Justice Quarterly 9(4): 609-24. 1992.

=== Articles ===
- Ross, Lee E. (2023). “Combining Batterers Intervention with Alcoholics Anonymous: The Spiritual Defeat of Recidivism.” Journal of Forensic Research and Criminal Investigation. 5(1): 143-149. www.scitcentral.com.
- Ross, Lee E. (2021). Prisoner Reformation and the Promise of Religion. Religions. 12(2), 105; https://doi.org/10.3390/rel12020105
- Ross, Lee E. (2020). Anti-Transgender Violence: A Crisis in Identity and Intolerance. Journal of Forensic Science and Criminal Investigation. 1(1): 19-24 www.scitcentral.com.
- Ross, Lee E. (2017). Predictive Analytics and Risk Assessment: A Logical Response to Intimate Partner Homicide. International Journal of Criminal and Forensic Sciences, 1:1-3.
- Ross, Lee E. (2015). Practitioner Attitudes towards Risk Assessments. Law Enforcement Executive Forum, 15, 1:66-78.
- Ross, Lee E. and Leslie, T. (2014). Criminal Justice Practitioner Attitudes toward Domestic Violence: Another Day in Paradise, Law Enforcement Executive Forum, 14, 3:18-31.
- Ross. Lee E. and Kane. K. (2014). Exploring the Utility of Actuarial Assessments in Cases of Intimate Partner Homicide. Law Enforcement Executive Forum, 14, 2:44-58.
