= The Color of Crime (book) =

1998 book by Katheryn Russell-Brown

- The second edition published in 2008
- Author: Katheryn Russell-Brown
- Language: English
- Publisher: New York University Press
- Publication date: 1998
- Publication place: United States
- Pages: 203
- ISBN: 0-8147-7471-7

The Color of Crime: Racial Hoaxes, White Fear, Black Protectionism, Police Harassment and Other Macroaggressions is a 1998 book by American academic Katheryn Russell-Brown (Katheryn K. Russell at the time of the book's publication), published by New York University Press (NYUP), with a second edition in 2008. The book discusses the topic of race and crime in the United States, particularly in the context of black–white relations.

It looks at the stereotypes of black men as criminals (what she refers to as the "criminalblackman" myth); whether black people commit a disproportionate amount of crime; how the criminal stereotypes have enabled the use of "racial hoaxes"; whether black people are discriminated against in society, in law enforcement, and in the justice system; white supremacism and white racism; how black people protect their own; and the idea of "macroagression" where a whole society is involved in persecuting a group. The book has been widely cited since its publication.

== Synopsis ==
The Color of Crime provides an overview of race, crime, and law, beginning with a discussion of slavery. Russell-Brown writes that crime and young black men have become synonymous in the American mind, giving rise to the "criminalblackman" stereotype.

The book popularised the term "racial hoax", which Russell-Brown defines as occurring when someone fabricates a crime and blames it on another person because of their race or when an actual crime has been committed and the perpetrator falsely blames someone because of their race. It gives the cases of Susan Smith, Jesse Anderson, and Charles Stuart as examples of racial hoaxes. She proposes six principles to achieve fairness in the criminal justice system:

1. Criminal penalties apply to everyone, regardless of the race of the offender.
2. Criminal penalties apply to everyone, regardless of the race of the victim.
3. The race of the offender is not relevant in determining whether his actions constitute a crime. The offender's actions would have been considered criminal, even if he were another race.
4. The race of the victim is not relevant in determining whether the offender's action constitutes a crime.
5. The offender's racial pedigree (e.g., "degree of Blackness") is not used to determine punishment.
6. There are checks and balances that mitigate against racial bias within the legal system.

== Reception ==
The Color of Crime has been widely cited since its publication and has been described as a pivotal book. NYUP states the book was "heralded as a path-breaking book". An edition of the American Journal of Sociology states that Russell-Brown makes an "indispensable, intelligent, and practical contribution" to the issues of race and crime. Erica Chito Childs in Fade to Black and White: Interracial Images in Popular Culture (2009) writes that the book provides an excellent analysis of the media reaction in the O. J. Simpson murder case.

However, Russell-Brown, who is African-American, and the book have been criticised for being biased. Critics have said the book downplays the level of black crime and that it over-attributes black crime to a discriminatory justice system.

== Sources ==
- Russell-Brown, Katheryn (1998). The Color of Crime: Racial Hoaxes, White Fear, Black Protectionism, Police Harassment and Other Macroaggressions. New York University Press. ISBN 0-8147-7471-7
