= Racial hoax =

False claim about a crime

A racial hoax occurs when a person (usually the purported victim) falsely claims that a crime was committed by a member of a specific race. The crime may be fictitious, or may be an actual crime.

The term was popularised by Katheryn Russell-Brown in her book The Color of Crime: Racial Hoaxes, White Fear, Black Protectionism, Police Harassment and Other Macroaggressions (1998). A racial hoax can be performed by a person of any race, against a person of any race.

== Concept ==
Patricia L. Brougham argued that the common stereotype of criminal black men has enabled the use of racial hoaxes against this group. Brougham writes that these stereotypes cause law enforcement agencies to believe that a black perpetrator exists when in reality the allegation is false.

Russell-Brown argues that racial hoaxes are devised, perpetrated, and successful because they take advantage of fears and stereotypes. According to her, white-on-black hoaxes are the most likely to receive media attention and to cause social and economic problems. She argues that anyone performing a racial hoax should face criminal charges, particularly if a black person is targeted, and that hoaxes targeting black people create more severe problems than those against other racial groups. Letha A. See in Violence as Seen Through a Prism of Color (2001) sees the hoax as a unique method used against specific racial groups, rather than against individuals. Sally S. Simpson and Robert Agnew suggest that the unusual nature of some racial hoaxes can cause them to be dismissed.

Between 1987 and 1996 in the United States, Russell-Brown documented 67 racial hoax cases and noted that 70% were white-on-black hoaxes, more than half were exposed within a week, hoaxes are most frequently used to allege assault, rape, or murder, and hoax perpetrators were charged with filing a false report in about 45% of cases. These cases represent only a fraction of the total number of cases because racial hoaxes are not reported as such and most crimes are not covered in the media. According to Russell-Brown, a high proportion of the white-on-black hoaxes were perpetrated by police and judicial officers; she documents seven such cases. Historically the most common type of hoax perpetrated against black males was rape. Because of fears over the 'black rapist', Russell-Brown suggests "it is not surprising that so many White women have created Black male rapists as their fictional criminals".

An alternative type of hoax occurs when a member of a disadvantaged group pretends to be a victim of a hate crime often in order to inflame societal racial tensions, gain social capital through legitimizing grievance and gaining victim status or to distract attention from their own misconduct in another activity.

In the United States there has been little legislative response to racial hoaxes. Russel-Brown wrote that (at the time of the book written) only New Jersey considered new laws to criminalize racial hoaxes.

== Cases ==
=== Abraham Surasky ===
Jewish peddler Abraham Surasky was killed in an anti-Semitic attack by two white Christian men in 1903. The perpetrators invented a story accusing Surasky of sexually assaulting a white woman in order to justify their crime.

=== Scottsboro Boys ===
In 1931, two white women falsely accused nine African-American teenagers of raping them on a train in Alabama. All but one were convicted and sentenced to death by all-white juries.

=== Lois Thompson ===
On March 27, 1935, 19-year-old Lois Thompson, who was white, shot a Chinese-American man named Daniel Shaw in Tahlequah, Oklahoma, accusing him of being responsible for a month-long extortion campaign against her. It was soon established that Thompson and her sister had concocted the extortion plot themselves as a ploy for attention and had attempted to frame Shaw for the crimes by exploiting racial stereotypes. Thompson was convicted of attempted murder and spent thirty days in jail.

=== Murder of Florence Castle ===
A white woman named Florence Thompson Castle was murdered in her sleep in a hotel room in Chicago in June 1936. The killer wrote the words "Black Legion Game" on the wall, referencing a white supremacist terror group known as the Black Legion. The killer was later revealed to be a black man, Robert Nixon, who had written the message on the wall in an attempt to implicate white supremacist groups in the crime.

=== Emmett Till ===
Emmett Till was a 14-year-old African-American who was accused of "offending" a white woman in Money, Mississippi, in 1955. He was abducted and lynched several days later. In 2017, author Timothy Tyson released details of a 2008 interview with Carolyn Bryant. He claimed that during the interview she had disclosed that she had fabricated parts of her testimony at the trial of his accused killers. Tyson said that during the interview, Bryant retracted her testimony that Till had grabbed her around her waist and uttered obscenities, saying "that part's not true". However, the "recanting" claim made by Tyson was not on his tape-recording of the interview. "It is true that that part is not on tape because I was setting up the tape recorder" Tyson said. Donham's daughter-in-law, Marsha Bryant, who was present for the two interviews, said her mother-in-law "never recanted." The support Tyson provided to back up his claim was a handwritten note that he said had been made at the time.

=== Kissing Case ===
In October 1958, a white girl in Monroe, North Carolina, told her mother that she had kissed two black boys on their cheeks while playing with them. Her mother became enraged and falsely accused the boys of molesting her daughter, leading to both of them being sentenced to reform school until the age of 21. They were pardoned three months later by Governor Luther H. Hodges under international pressure.

=== Manson Family ===
Between July 27 and August 9, 1969, members of Charles Mansons cult known as the Manson Family committed eight murders, supposedly as part of a plot to trigger a race war known as the Helter Skelter scenario. The killers left graffiti at the crime scenes implicating Black Power groups in the murders.

=== William Henry Hance ===
During the 1978 wave of murders of white women in Columbus, Georgia by the African-American Stocking Strangler, a letter was sent to the local police purporting to be from a group of white vigilantes calling themselves the "Forces of Evil" and claiming to be holding an African-American woman named Gail Jackson hostage with the intention of killing her unless the Stocking Strangler was apprehended. She had in fact been murdered five weeks earlier. After her body was found, the "Forces of Evil" claimed responsibility for her murder and that of another black woman, Irene Thirkield, threatening to keep killing black women until the killer was found.

An investigation soon led police to William Henry Hance, a black man, who confessed to the "Forces of Evil" murders and the murder of a white woman the previous year. It was established that Hance had concocted a scheme to avoid suspicion for the Jackson and Thirkield murders by blaming them on white racist vigilantes outraged over the "Stocking Strangler" murders. Hance was executed for the murders in 1994.

=== Tawana Brawley ===
Tawana Brawley, an African-American teenager, was found in a trash bag covered in faeces after being missing from her home in Wappingers Falls, New York for four days. She claimed that she had been abducted and raped by four white men, and her legal team subsequently claimed that the authorities were protecting the assailants because they were white, sparking a debate about systemic racism in New York. A grand jury later concluded that Brawley had fabricated her story and had deliberately set things up to make it look like she had been assaulted. Brawley's legal team — Al Sharpton, Alton Maddox and Vernon Mason — were accused of having exploited the story to trigger racial outrage and advance their careers, and one of the men accused successfully sued Brawley, Sharpton, Maddox and Mason for defamation.

=== Charles Stuart ===
The case of Charles Stuart is often cited as an example of a racial hoax. On October 23, 1989, in Boston, Stuart and his pregnant wife Carol were driving when, according to Stuart, a black gunman forced his way into the car and shot them both, hitting Carol in the head and Stuart in the body. Still alive, Stuart drove away and called the police, who conducted a search of Mission Hill, Boston, a mostly black area. Carol died later that night; the baby, delivered by caesarean section, died 17 days later.

Stuart picked out Willie Bennett, a black man, from a photo lineup. The police shifted their attention onto Stuart when Stuart's brother Matthew told them that Stuart had committed the murder, and when they noted inconsistencies in Stuart's account. On January 4, 1990, Stuart committed suicide. The police later learned that Stuart had committed the murder to cash in on his wife's insurance policy.

=== Jesse Anderson ===
In 1992, Jesse Anderson became infamous for stabbing his wife Barbara E. Anderson thirty-seven times while in the parking lot of a T.G.I. Friday's in Milwaukee. Anderson blamed two African-American men for attacking him and his wife, and even presented police with a Los Angeles Clippers basketball cap he claimed to have knocked off the head of one of the assailants.

When details of the crime were made public, a university student told police Anderson had purchased the hat from him a few days earlier. According to employees at a military surplus store, the red-handled fishing knife which was used to murder Barbara was sold to Anderson only a few weeks earlier. Police stated that the store was the only one in Milwaukee that sold that type of knife. Anderson was shortly thereafter charged with murder, found guilty, and sentenced to life imprisonment.

=== Susan Smith ===
In October 1994, in South Carolina, Susan Smith drowned her sons by putting them in her car and letting it roll into John D. Long Lake. She called the police and stated that an armed black man had hijacked her car with her two sons inside. After an extensive manhunt, Smith confessed that she had killed her sons, and, in July 1995, was sentenced to life imprisonment.

=== Jennifer Wilbanks ===
Jennifer Wilbanks was a white woman who ran away from home on April 26, 2005, in order to avoid her upcoming wedding with John Mason, her fiancé. Her disappearance from Duluth, Georgia, sparked a nationwide search and intensive media coverage, including media speculation that Mason had killed her. On April 29, Wilbanks called Mason from Albuquerque, New Mexico, and falsely claimed that she had been kidnapped and sexually assaulted by a Hispanic man and a white woman. Wilbanks told investigators that she was abducted while running, and tied-up with rope in the back of a van, and was raped by a Hispanic man and forced to perform sexual acts with a white woman. Wilbanks pled no contest to a felony charge of providing false information to law enforcement, and served no time in jail.

=== Duke University lacrosse case ===
The Duke lacrosse case was a criminal investigation into a 2006 false accusation of rape made against three white members of the men's lacrosse team at Duke University in Durham, North Carolina by Crystal Mangum, an African-American student at North Carolina Central University who worked as a stripper, dancer and escort.

Many people involved in, or commenting on, the case, including Durham prosecutor Mike Nifong (who was later disbarred), called the alleged assault, or suggested that the alleged assault was, a hate crime.

In December 2024 Mangum admitted it was a fabrication and asked for forgiveness.

=== Ashley Todd mugging hoax ===
In October 2008, Ashley Todd, a volunteer for the U.S. presidential campaign of Republican John McCain, falsely claimed to have been the victim of robbery and politically motivated physical assault by a supporter of McCain's Democratic opponent Barack Obama.

The story broke less than two weeks before the 2008 United States presidential election on November 4. Todd later confessed to inventing the story after surveillance photos and a polygraph test were presented. She was charged with filing a false police report, and entered a probation program for first-time offenders.

=== Maria Daly BLM burglary hoax ===
In October 2016, Maria Daly, the wife of a police officer, reported a burglary at her family home. She stated that jewelry and money had been stolen, and that her house was tagged with graffiti referencing the Black Lives Matter movement. Police determined that the entire account was false, and charged Daly with filing a false police report and misleading a police investigation. Daly eventually pleaded guilty, essentially confirming that she had staged the burglary and spray-painted the house herself.

=== Sherri Papini disappearance hoax ===
Sherri Papini disappeared from her husband and family on November 2, 2016, reportedly while out jogging a mile from her home in Redding, California. Papini was 34 years old at the time. She reappeared three weeks later on Thanksgiving Day, November 24, claiming that she was freed by her captors at 4:30 that morning still wearing restraints. According to Shasta County Sheriff Tom Bosenko, in interviews Papini said she was held by two Hispanic women who took steps to keep their faces hidden from her, either by wearing masks or by keeping Papini's head covered. On March 3, 2022, Sherri Papini was arrested by the FBI, accused of lying to federal agents and faking her kidnapping to spend time with her ex-boyfriend away from her husband and family. In September 2022 Papini pleaded guilty to making false statements and was sentenced to 18 months in prison.

=== Yasmin Seweid Trump fans subway harassment ===
In December 2016, Yasmin Seweid, an 18-year-old Muslim woman, claimed that a group of white men approached her on a New York City subway and stated "Donald Trump! Donald Trump! Fucking terrorist, get out of this country, you don't belong here, terrorist, get out of this country." She also claimed one of the men grabbed her bag and broke the strap. Seweid later admitted that she lied about the incident because she did not want her strict father to find out that she was out past her curfew drinking alcohol. Seweid was arrested and pleaded guilty to falsely reporting an incident and disorderly conduct.

=== Breana Harmon abduction hoax ===
In 2017, 19-year-old white woman Breana Harmon from Denison, Texas, falsely claimed that she was abducted and gang-raped by three black men. She initially was in an argument with her boyfriend, then ran away and intentionally cut herself to give the appearance of an assault. She then stripped-down to a T-shirt and underwear, went into a church and told the people there that she had been raped by three masked black men. She later pleaded guilty to filing a false police report.

=== Jussie Smollett hate-crime hoax ===
In January 2019, Jussie Smollett, an African-American actor and singer on the Fox drama series Empire, made national news for fabricating a racially motivated attack against himself. On January 22, 2019, a letter arrived at the Chicago studio of Smollett's employer that was addressed to Smollett and depicted a stick figure hanging from a tree with a gun pointing towards it. It read "Smollett, Jussie you will die" and "MAGA" and contained a white powder determined to be Tylenol. On January 29, 2019, Smollett told Chicago police that he was attacked in the early morning of that day in the 300 block of East Lower North Water Street in Chicago's Streeterville neighborhood by two men in ski masks who called him racial and homophobic slurs in what was initially investigated as a hate crime. Smollett was indicted on February 20, 2019, for disorderly conduct consisting of paying two Nigerian-American brothers to stage a fake hate crime assault on him and filing a false police report. Smollett's defense team reached a deal with prosecutors on March 26, 2019, in which all charges were dropped in return for Smollett performing community service and forfeiting his $10,000 bond. On March 27, 2019, it was announced that the FBI would be investigating as to why the charges were dismissed. On February 11, 2020, Smollett was re-indicted by Special Prosecutor Dan Webb on six counts of disorderly conduct for lying to the police. A jury delivered its verdict on December 9, 2021, finding Smollett guilty on five of the six counts. However in November 2024, the Illinois Supreme Court reversed that conviction holding that retrying Smollett after he had paid $10,000 and served community service in exchange for dismissal of all charges violated Smollett's constitutional due process rights.

=== Amari Allen dreadlock cutting hoax ===
In September 2019, Amari Allen, a black middle-school student in Virginia, claimed that three male white classmates pinned her down on the playground and cut off "chunks" of her dreadlocks. According to Allen, the boys called her "ugly" and her hair "nappy." Her grandmother asked on national TV for the boys to be dismissed from the school. However, security camera footage did not corroborate her story, and Allen eventually confessed that she had cut her hair herself.

=== Gil Ofarim Star of David hoax ===
In October 2021, Gil Ofarim, a German-Israeli singer-songwriter, posted a video on Instagram stating that staff at the Leipzig Westin hotel told him he'd only be admitted if he didn't wear his Star of David pendant. After dissemination of the video and protests outside the hotel, security footage showed Ofarim without such a pendant during the confrontation, and employees regarded him as antagonistic. Charges were filed against Ofarim for libel and false suspicion. These charges were dropped in November 2023 after Ofarim admitted in court that he had made up the allegations against the hotel and agreed to pay 10,000 euros to the Jewish Community of Leipzig.

=== Sherita Dixon-Cole Rape Hoax ===
In May 2018 Sherita Dixon-Cole, a black human resources professional, accused a white Texas state trooper of kidnapping and sexually assaulting her during a DUI arrest. The story got international attention and was amplified by tweets and articles made by civil rights activist Shaun King who published the Officers name. The trooper arrested Dixon-Cole for drunk driving, during which she claimed during the arrest he pulled to an alley and force him on to her. The Texas Department of Public Safety released 2 hours of body camera footage, the entire arrest, proving that there was no assault. Dixons attorney published a statement admitting that the charges were false and apologizing to the officer. However, while Shaun King wrote an article admitting that he was lied to and the charges were false, no apologies were made.

== See also ==
- Blood libel, a false accusation against the Jews
- False accusation of rape
- Racial bias in criminal news in the United States
- To Kill a Mockingbird, a novel and subsequent film and play centering on racially charged accusations of a crime

== Sources ==
- Russell-Brown, Katheryn (1998). The Color of Crime: Racial Hoaxes, White Fear, Black Protectionism, Police Harassment and Other Macroaggressions see Google Books. New York University Press. ISBN 0-8147-7471-7
- Simpson, Sally S.; Agnew, Robert. (2000). Of Crime and Criminality: The Use of Theory in Everyday Life. Pine Forge Press. ISBN 0-7619-8638-3
- Henry, Stuart; Lanier, Mark. (2001). What Is Crime?: Controversies Over the Nature of Crime and What to Do about It. Rowman & Littlefield. ISBN 0-8476-9807-6
- See, Letha A. (Lee) (2001). Violence as Seen Through a Prism of Color. Haworth Press. ISBN 0-7890-1393-2
- Markovitz, Jonathan (2004). Legacies of Lynching: Racial Violence and Memory. University of Minnesota Press. ISBN 0-8166-3995-7
