= Consensus model (criminal justice) =

Theory that that parts of a criminal justice system should work together

The Consensus Model or Systems Perspective of criminal justice argues that the organizations of a criminal justice system either do, or should, work cooperatively to produce justice, as opposed to competitively. A criminal justice model in which the majority of citizens in a society share the same values and beliefs. Criminal acts conflict with these values and beliefs.

== See also ==
- Conflict Model
