= Crime in the United States =

United States
- Crime rates* (2022)

Violent crimes
- Homicide: 6.3
- Rape: 40
- Robbery: 66.1
- Aggravated assault: 268.2
- Total violent crime: 380.7

Property crimes
- Burglary: 269.8
- Motor vehicle theft: 282.7
- Arson: 11.6
- Total property crime: 1,954.4
- Note: Reported crimes per 100,000 population Source: Federal Bureau of Investigation Crime Data Explorer

Crime has been recorded in the United States since its founding and has fluctuated significantly over time. Most available data underestimate crime before the 1930s (due to incomplete datasets and other factors), giving the false impression that crime was low in the early 1900s and had a sharp rise after. Instead, violent crime during the colonial period was likely three times higher than the highest modern rates in the data currently available, and crime had been on the decline since colonial times. Within the better data for crime reporting and recording available starting in the 1930s, crime reached its broad, bulging modern peak between the 1970s and early 1990s. After 1992, crime rates have generally trended downwards each year, with the exceptions of a slight increase in property crimes in 2001 and increases in violent crimes in 2005–2006, 2014–2016 and 2020–2021. Final FBI estimates for 2025 showed that violent crime offenses fell 9.3% from 2024, including an 18.1% decline in murder and nonnegligent manslaughter.

As the Marshall Project notes, "By 2020, almost every law enforcement agency was included in the FBI's database." But the new system, which went into effect in 2021, is missing a lot of data. In 2022, 32% of police departments stopped reporting crime data, and another 24% of departments only reported crime data for some months during the year. This results in the omitted data not being counted, leading to an artificially lower crime rate. Federal data for 2020–2021 and limited data from select U.S. cities collected by the nonpartisan Council on Criminal Justice showed significantly elevated rates of homicide and motor vehicle theft in 2020–2022. Although both overall crime rates and the homicide rate have fallen far below the peak of crime seen in the United States during the late 1980s and early 1990s, the homicide rate in the U.S. is high relative to other "high income"/developed nations, with eight major U.S. cities ranked among the 50 cities with the highest homicide rate in the world in 2022. The aggregate cost of crime in the United States is significant, with an estimated value of $4.9 trillion reported in 2021. Data from the first half of 2023, from government and private sector sources show that the murder rate has dropped, as much as 12% in as many as 90 cities across the United States. The drop in homicide rates is not uniform across the country however, with some cities such as Memphis, TN, showing an uptick in murder rates.

The two major sources of national crime data are the Federal Bureau of Investigation's (FBI) Uniform Crime Reports (which indexes eight types of offenses recorded by law enforcement) and the Bureau of Justice Statistics's National Crime Victimization Surveys (which may cover offenses not reported to police). In addition to the primary Uniform Crime Report known as Crime in the United States, the FBI publishes annual reports on the status of law enforcement in the United States. The report's definitions of specific crimes are considered standard by many American law enforcement agencies. According to the FBI, index crime in the United States includes violent crime and property crime. Violent crime consists of five criminal offenses: murder and non-negligent manslaughter, rape, robbery, aggravated assault, and gang violence; property crime consists of burglary, larceny, motor vehicle theft, and arson.

The basic aspect of a crime considers the offender, the victim, type of crime, severity and level, and location. These are the basic questions asked by law enforcement when first investigating any situation. This information is formatted into a government record by a police arrest report, also known as an incident report. These forms lay out all the information needed to put the crime in the system and it provides a strong outline for further law enforcement agents to review. Society has a strong misconception about crime rates due to media aspects heightening their fear factor. The system's crime data fluctuates by crime depending on certain influencing social factors such as economics, the dark figure of crime, population, and geography.

== Crime over time ==
Property crime rates in the United States per 100,000 population beginning in 1960. Source: Bureau of Justice Statistics.

Total incarceration in the United States by year

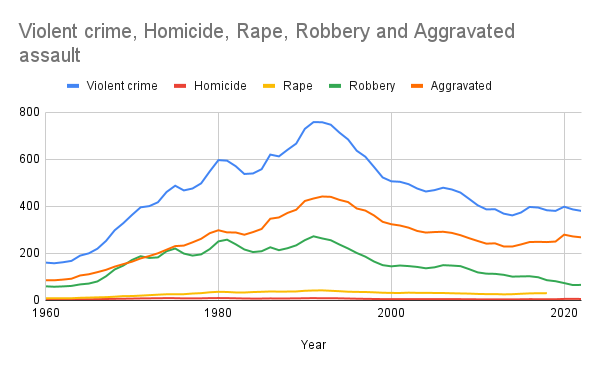
Violent crime in the United States 1960-2022

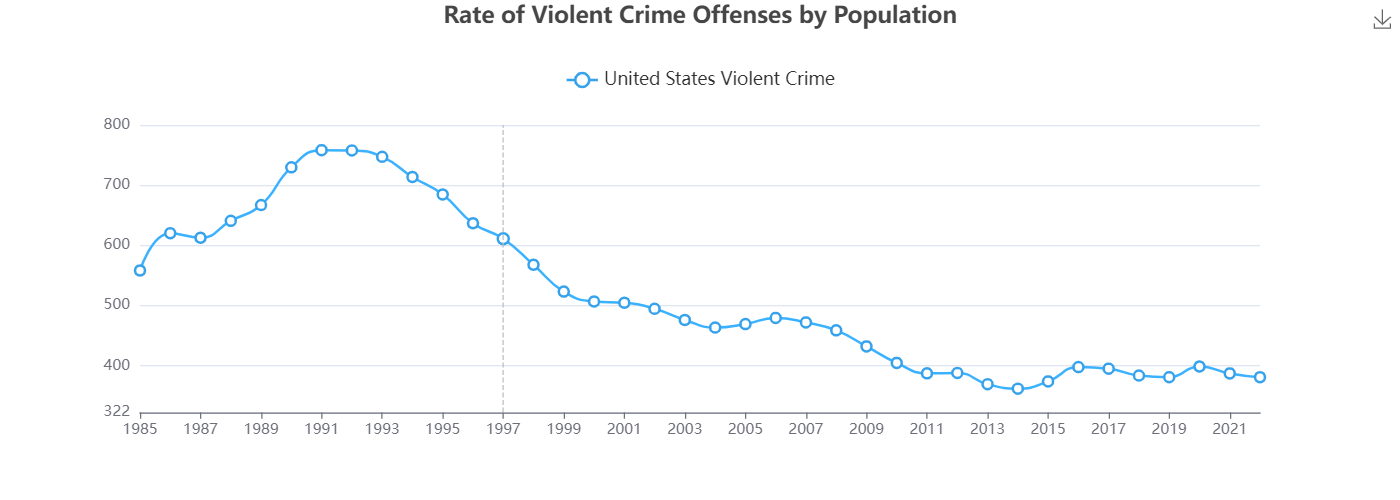
Rate of violent crime offenses per 100,000 people, by year, in the United States 1985-2022

After a slow decline, the number of hate crimes increased since the mid 2010s.

Despite accusations of a "crime crisis" of soaring violent crime under President Joe Biden, FBI data indicated the violent crime rate had declined significantly during the president's first two years in office, after a spike in 2020 during the COVID pandemic. By 2022, the violent crime rate was near a 50-year low, and preliminary data released in early 2024 indicated continuing declines in 2023. The FBI estimated that the violent crime rate fell 9.7% in 2025, the largest year-to-year decrease since national estimates began in 1936. The murder and nonnegligent manslaughter rate was 4.1 per 100,000 inhabitants, tying 1955 and 1956 for the lowest rate in the national estimate series.

In the early 1980s, a study (using data from the years 1978 to 1982) estimated that the cumulative lifetime risk of becoming a homicide victim (ie. the risk of dying due to homicide throughout one's life, rather than the commonly cited statistics of annual homicide risk) was 1 in 133. However, the study found considerable differences by race and gender, with the risks being 1 in 21 for black males, 1 in 104 for black females, 1 in 131 for white males, and 1 in 369 for white females. Since then, this risk has been decreasing, it was 1 in 240 in 1997, and 1 in 287 in 2009.

After World War II, crime rates increased in the United States, peaking from the 1970s to the early-1990s. Violent crime nearly quadrupled between 1960 and its peak in 1991. Property crime more than doubled over the same period. Since the 1990s, however, contrary to common misconception, crime in the United States has declined steadily, and has significantly declined by the late 1990s and also in the early 2000s. Not only did crime decrease overall nationally in the United States in the 1990s but also in major cities during that decade and continuing into the following decades. Several theories have been proposed to explain this decline:

- The lead–crime hypothesis suggests the removal of lead from gasoline and paint reduced crime rates. A 2022 meta-analysis of 24 studies found that there is substantial evidence linking lead exposure to a heightened risk of criminal behavior, particularly violent crimes. This aligns with earlier research suggesting lead exposure may foster impulsive and aggressive tendencies, potential precursors to violent offenses. While a correlation between declining lead pollution and declining criminality is supported by research, it is likely not a significant factor in reduced crime rates, and the link is generally overstated in lead-crime literature.
- The number of police officers hired and employed to various police forces increased considerably in the 1990s.
- On September 16, 1994, President Bill Clinton signed the Violent Crime Control and Law Enforcement Act into law. Under the act, over $30 billion in federal aid was spent over a six-year period to improve state and local law enforcement, prisons and crime prevention programs. Proponents of the law, including the President, touted it as a lead contributor to the sharp drop in crime which occurred throughout the 1990s, while critics have dismissed it as an unprecedented federal boondoggle.
- The rate of incarceration has significantly increased since the mid-1970s.
- Starting in the mid-1980s, crack cocaine use grew rapidly before declining again a decade later. Some authors have suggested a link between violent crimes and crack use.
- Legalized abortion following Roe v. Wade in 1973 reduced the number of children born to mothers in difficult circumstances, and a difficult childhood makes children more likely to become criminals.
- The changing demographics of an aging population has been cited for the drop in overall crime.
- Rising income
- The introduction of the data-driven policing practice CompStat (management system created in 1994) is claimed to have significantly reduced crimes in cities that adopted it.
- The quality and extent of use of security technology both increased around the time of the crime decline, after which the rate of car theft declined; this may have caused rates of other crimes to decline as well.
- Increased rates of immigration to the United States

A few of these factors are superimposed against the homicide rate chart under the "Homicide" heading of the International comparison section.

=== Select crimes reported by year ===
This table looks at data nationally and is from the FBI crime data explorer. It can be accessed either via downloadable CSV files or directly through the interface itself.

Crime	Violent			Property and nonviolent crimes		
Year	Homicide	Rape	Aggravated Assault	Arson	Motor vehicle theft	Shoplifting
2025	11,721	101,648	672,892	27,628	569,384	952,303
2024	16,924	125,354	842,290	36,318	846,233	1,116,700
2023	19,677	131,033	873,773	37,744	1,055,283	994,948
2022	21,846	137,689	886,546	39,969	925,270	765,242
2021	17,924	113,008	662,202	30,239	620,307	602,085
2020	17,985	129,857	884,609	45,972	786,661	521,507
2019	16,696	142,341	791,348	36,182	702,747	507,162
2018	16,853	144,049	797,282	39,361	742,463	415,713 (Note: Data availability is low as it was under 50% for every month.)
2017	17,466	135,941	795,176	42,992	758,273	390,950 (Note: Data availability is low as it was under 50% for every month.)
2016	17,123	126,395	789,157	45,729	756,353	165,609 (Note: Data availability is low as it was under 50% for every month.)
2015	15,643	119,604	749,044	40,827	698,387	148,340 (Note: Data availability is low as it was under 50% for every month.)
2014	13,966	108,388	718,857	46,195	674,711	128,784 (Note: Data availability is low as it was under 50% for every month.)
2013	14,114	96,316	713,480	47,204	690,039	109,124 (Note: Data availability is low as it was under 50% for every month.)
2012	14,828	83,439	752,258	55,336	715,900	98,200 (Note: Data availability is low as it was under 50% for every month.)
2011	14,552	82,607	742,224	54,546	708,975	76,943 (Note: Data availability is low as it was under 50% for every month.)
2010	14,576	84,190	769,510	55,986	729,035	68,702 (Note: Data availability is low as it was under 50% for every month.)
2009	15,166	84,304	793,915	59,860	783,763	64,028 (Note: Data availability is low as it was under 50% for every month.)
2008	16,171	83,758	825,112	65,789	944,535	58,000 (Note: Data availability is low as it was under 50% for every month.)
2007	16,878	84,735	845,370	68,091	1,081,065	47,549 (Note: Data availability is low as it was under 50% for every month.)
2006	16,931	87,378	849,368	72,969	1,175,354	36,841 (Note: Data availability is low as it was under 50% for every month.)
2005	16,179	87,308	824,560	68,508	1,198,513	37,664 (Note: Data availability is low as it was under 50% for every month.)
2004	15,607	88,245	819,493	69,300	1,200,270	33,219 (Note: Data availability is low as it was under 50% for every month.)
2003	15,814	85,763	814,835	72,809	1,214,298	21,081 (Note: Data availability is low as it was under 50% for every month.)
2002	15,617	87,334	851,015	77,148	1,203,467	27,054 (Note: Data availability is low as it was under 50% for every month.)
2001	15,316	82,766	857,356	79,040	1,176,379	18,588 (Note: Data availability is low as it was under 50% for every month.)
2000	14,728	81,213	858,797	69,466	1,104,060	13,682 (Note: Data availability is low as it was under 50% for every month.)
1999	14,360	79,042	846,559	78,495	1,084,637	5,707 (Note: Data availability is low as it was under 50% for every month.)
1998	15,763	83,033	909,698	80,150	1,172,803	2,521 (Note: Data availability is low as it was under 50% for every month.)
1997	16,930	85,210	941,050	87,260	1,279,586	1,755 (Note: Data availability is low as it was under 50% for every month.)
1996	17,978	82,296	915,417	91,697	1,278,446	1,388 (Note: Data availability is low as it was under 50% for every month.)
1995	20,365	87,550	1,016,579	96,536	1,278,446	439 (Note: Data availability is low as it was under 50% for every month.)

According to a mid‑year report from the Council on Criminal Justice (CCJ), which tracks crime trends in a sample of large American cities, the first half of 2026 saw a continuation of the broad decline in crime that began in previous years. Compared with the same period in 2025, homicide fell by 18 percent, robbery by 17 percent, and motor vehicle theft by 20 percent. Carjacking experienced the steepest drop among all offenses measured, plunging 47 percent. At the same time, however, not all categories followed the downward trajectory. Drug‑related offenses rose by 12 percent, domestic violence increased by 8 percent, and reported sexual assaults edged up by 3 percent over the six‑month window.

=== Crime rate in select cities by year ===
==== New York City ====
This table shows the number of select crimes in New York City, New York by year. Data from the FBI Crime Data Explorer can be found in downloaded CSV files. Table source:

Year	Violent		Non-violent/property
Year	Homicide	Rape	Arson (Note: Data is according to the FBI Crime Data Explorer)
2024	382	1,748	868
2023	391	1,455	911
2022	438	1,617	34
2021	488	1,491	0 (Note: No data was reported for this year.)
2020	468	1,427	0 (Note: No data was reported for this year.)
2019	319	1,755	0 (Note: No data was reported for this year.)
2018	295	1,794	0 (Note: No data was reported for this year.)
2017	292	1,449	0 (Note: No data was reported for this year.)
2016	335	1,438	0 (Note: No data was reported for this year.)
2015	352	1,438	0 (Note: No data was reported for this year.)
2014	333	1,352	0 (Note: No data was reported for this year.)
2013	335	1,378	0 (Note: No data was reported for this year.)
2012	419	1,445	0 (Note: No data was reported for this year.)
2011	515	1,420	0 (Note: No data was reported for this year.)
2010	536	1,373	0 (Note: No data was reported for this year.)
2009	471	1,205	0 (Note: No data was reported for this year.)
2008	523	1,299	0 (Note: No data was reported for this year.)
2007	496	1,351	0 (Note: No data was reported for this year.)
2006	596	1,525	0 (Note: No data was reported for this year.)
2005	539	1,858	0 (Note: No data was reported for this year.)
2004	570	1,905	0 (Note: No data was reported for this year.)
2003	597	2,070	0 (Note: No data was reported for this year.)
2002	587	2,144	0 (Note: No data was reported for this year.)
2001	649	1,981	0 (Note: No data was reported for this year.)
2000	673	2,068	0 (Note: No data was reported for this year.)
1999	644	1,702 (Note: This comes from the FBI Crime Data Explorer and is data reported from the New York City Police Department.)	0 (Note: No data was reported for this year.)
1998	633	2,046 (Note: This comes from the FBI Crime Data Explorer and is data reported from the New York City Police Department.)	0 (Note: No data was reported for this year.)
1997	770	2,157 (Note: This comes from the FBI Crime Data Explorer and is data reported from the New York City Police Department.)	0 (Note: No data was reported for this year.)
1996	983	2,332 (Note: This comes from the FBI Crime Data Explorer and is data reported from the New York City Police Department.)	0 (Note: No data was reported for this year.)
1995	1,177	2,374 (Note: This comes from the FBI Crime Data Explorer and is data reported from the New York City Police Department.)	2,307 (Note: Data is only reported for the first seven months of the year in the FBI Crime Data Explorer.)
1994	1,561	2,666 (Note: This comes from the FBI Crime Data Explorer and is data reported from the New York City Police Department.)	4,992 (Note: Data is only reported for the first seven months of the year in the FBI Crime Data Explorer.)

==== Los Angeles ====
This table lists the number of select crimes reported in the city of Los Angeles, California by year. The data shown comes from the Los Angeles Police Department and is found from the FBI Crime Data Explorer's downloaded CSV files. Table source:

Year	Violent		Non-violent/property	
Year	Homicide	Rape	Arson	Motor vehicle theft
2024	265	1,570	410	9,902
2023	324	1,945	179	25,594
2022	387	2,083	1,881	25,493
2021	N/A	N/A	N/A	N/A
2020	351	1,983	2,994	21,169
2019	258	2,274	1,672	15,642
2018	258	2,528	1,654	17,316
2017	281	2,455	1,414	19,193
2016	293	2,343	1,241	18,591
2015	282	2,209	1,131	16,152
2014	260	1,126	1,137	13,788
2013	251	764	1,430	14,382

==== Chicago ====
This table lists the number of select crimes reported in the city of Chicago, Illinois by year. The data shown comes from the Chicago Police Department and is found from the FBI Crime Data Explorer's downloaded CSV files. Table source:

Year	Violent		Non-violent/property	
Year	Homicide	Rape	Arson	Motor vehicle theft
2025	346	1,651	364	18,027
2024	461	1,551	462	22,663
2023	499	1,244	169	26,483
2022	604	1,374	152	21,191
2021 (Note: There is a gap in data from the FBI Crime Data Explorer for the first 6 months of 2021.)	370	668	110	6,743
2020	771	1,346	636	10,053
2019	495	1,785	420	9,092
2018	567	1,857	425	10,115
2017	653	1,762	514	11,578
2016	768	1,662	587	11,436
2015	481	1,482	536	10,200
2014	415	1,388	461	9,997
2013	416	1,338	431	12,683
2012	500	N/A (Note: No data is reported on the FBI Crime Data explorer under this category for this year in Chicago.)	N/A (Note: No data is reported on the FBI Crime Data explorer under this category for this year in Chicago.)	17,001
2011	431	N/A (Note: No data is reported on the FBI Crime Data explorer under this category for this year in Chicago.)	N/A (Note: No data is reported on the FBI Crime Data explorer under this category for this year in Chicago.)	19,446
2010	432	N/A (Note: No data is reported on the FBI Crime Data explorer under this category for this year in Chicago.)	N/A (Note: No data is reported on the FBI Crime Data explorer under this category for this year in Chicago.)	19,078
2009	458	N/A (Note: No data is reported on the FBI Crime Data explorer under this category for this year in Chicago.)	610	15,469
2008	510	N/A (Note: No data is reported on the FBI Crime Data explorer under this category for this year in Chicago.)	1,247	18,969
2007	443	N/A (Note: No data is reported on the FBI Crime Data explorer under this category for this year in Chicago.)	700	18,604
2006	468	N/A (Note: No data is reported on the FBI Crime Data explorer under this category for this year in Chicago.)	712	21,828
2005	448	N/A (Note: No data is reported on the FBI Crime Data explorer under this category for this year in Chicago.)	682	22,496
2004	448	N/A (Note: No data is reported on the FBI Crime Data explorer under this category for this year in Chicago.)	782	22,799
2003	598	N/A (Note: No data is reported on the FBI Crime Data explorer under this category for this year in Chicago.)	947	22,799 (Note: In the FBI Crime Explorer the data for this year is listed as being the same as last year.)
2002	648	N/A (Note: No data is reported on the FBI Crime Data explorer under this category for this year in Chicago.)	1,022	25,245
2001	666	N/A (Note: No data is reported on the FBI Crime Data explorer under this category for this year in Chicago.)	1,004	27,694
2000	631	N/A (Note: No data is reported on the FBI Crime Data explorer under this category for this year in Chicago.)	1,062	29,727
1999	641	N/A (Note: No data is reported on the FBI Crime Data explorer under this category for this year in Chicago.)	1,267	36,075
1998	703	N/A (Note: No data is reported on the FBI Crime Data explorer under this category for this year in Chicago.)	1,289	31,826
1997	757	N/A (Note: No data is reported on the FBI Crime Data explorer under this category for this year in Chicago.)	1,544	33,607
1996	789	N/A (Note: No data is reported on the FBI Crime Data explorer under this category for this year in Chicago.)	1,560	34,091
1995	824	N/A (Note: No data is reported on the FBI Crime Data explorer under this category for this year in Chicago.)	1,241	36,197
1994	928	N/A (Note: No data is reported on the FBI Crime Data explorer under this category for this year in Chicago.)	1,626	40,016
1993	845	N/A (Note: No data is reported on the FBI Crime Data explorer under this category for this year in Chicago.)	1,676	40,438
1992	939	N/A (Note: No data is reported on the FBI Crime Data explorer under this category for this year in Chicago.)	1,852	44,988
1991	925	N/A (Note: No data is reported on the FBI Crime Data explorer under this category for this year in Chicago.)	2,069	47,396
1990	851	N/A (Note: No data is reported on the FBI Crime Data explorer under this category for this year in Chicago.)	2,656	48,626
1989	742	N/A (Note: No data is reported on the FBI Crime Data explorer under this category for this year in Chicago.)	2,558	45,898
1988	660	N/A (Note: No data is reported on the FBI Crime Data explorer under this category for this year in Chicago.)	2,891	45,012
1987	687	N/A (Note: No data is reported on the FBI Crime Data explorer under this category for this year in Chicago.)	2,804	39,715
1986	744	N/A (Note: No data is reported on the FBI Crime Data explorer under this category for this year in Chicago.)	2,225	48,511
1985	666	1,792	2,026	44,892

==== San Francisco ====
This table lists the number of crimes reported in San Francisco, California by year. Data prior to 2017 comes from the FBI Crime Data Explorer and covers data coming from or supplied by the San Francisco Police Department. Table sources:

Year	Violent		Non-violent/property	
Year	Homicide	Rape	Arson	Motor vehicle theft
2025	28	234	207	3,086
2024	35	255	228	5,440
2023	51	257	286	6,751
2022	56	268	293	6,335
2021	56	243	318	6,098
2020	48	235	319	6,105
2019	40	412	227	4,451
2018	46	455	249	4,371
2017	56	457	257	4,958
2016	57	342	255	5,433
2015	53	344	272	6,915
2014	45	355	241	6,126
2013	48	161	227	5,866
2012	69	108	207	5,339
2011	50	131	161	4,174
2010	48	133	156	3,903

=== Arrests ===
The number of arrests in the US, "all crimes", as reported by the FBI, began a decrease in the early 2010s.

The U.S. has a low clearance rate—cases solved or arrests made. Murder clearance rates of Australia, Britain and Germany are in the 70s and 90s percent range, compared to the U.S. in the 50s.

Each state has a set of statutes enforceable within its own borders. A state has no jurisdiction outside of its borders, even though still in the United States. It must request extradition from the state in which the suspect has fled. In 2014, there were 186,873 misdemeanor suspects outside specific states jurisdiction against whom no extradition would be sought. Philadelphia has about 20,000 of these since it is near a border with four other states. Extradition is estimated to cost a few hundred dollars per case.

Analysis of arrest data from California indicates that the most common causes of felony arrest are for violent offenses such as robbery and assault, property offenses such as burglary and auto theft, and drug offenses. For misdemeanors, the most common causes of arrest were traffic offenses, most notably impaired driving, drug offenses, and failure to appear in court. Other common causes of misdemeanor arrest included assault and battery and minor property offenses such as petty theft.

== Arrests by gender ==
In 2024 according to the FBI Crime Data Explorer males made up most arrests; 73% of all arrests came from males and females made up 27% nationally.

Between 1985 and 2024 males made up the majority of arrests as well; with 78% being male and 22% being female.

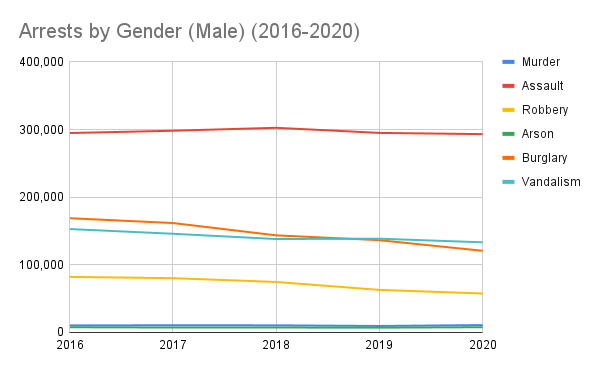
Arrests by Gender (Male) (2016–2020)

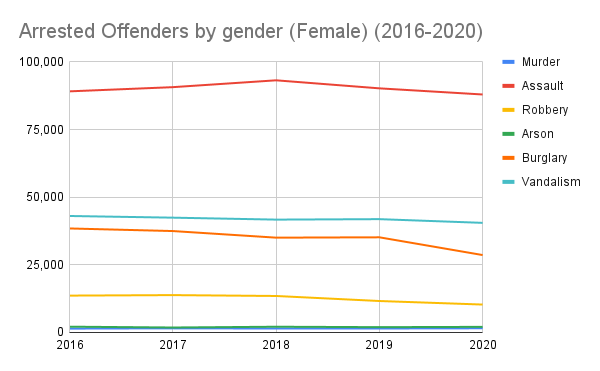
Arrested Offenders by gender (Female) (2016–2020)

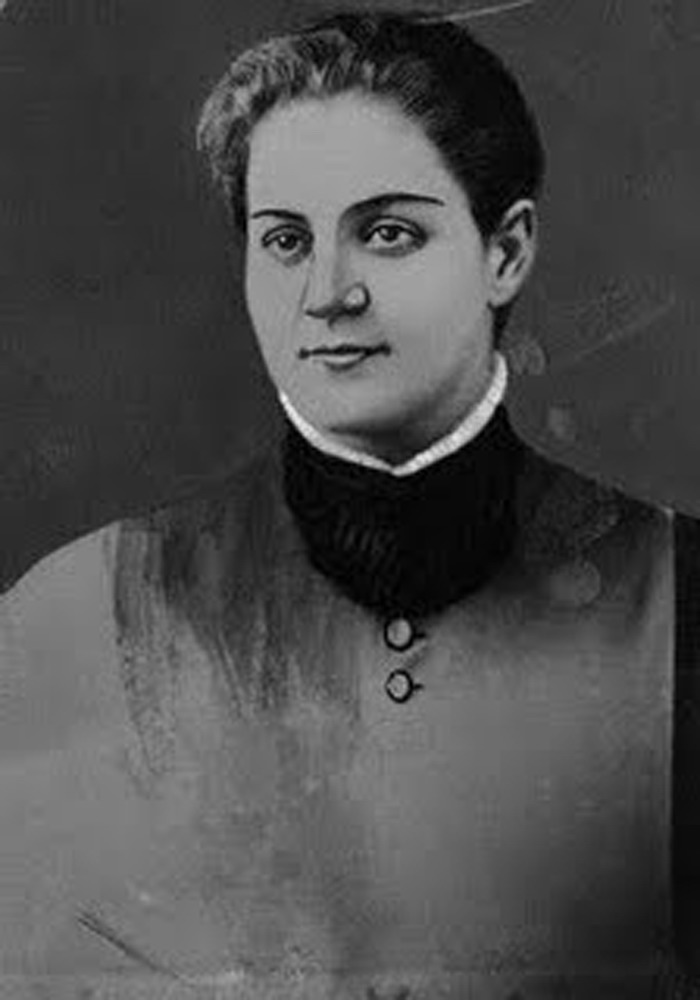
Under questioning, Jane Toppan stated she derived a sexual thrill from patients being near death.

== Arrests by age ==
In 2020, out of the 7,632,470 crimes documented that year, 5,721,190 of them were committed by someone who was at least 25 years of age. 4,225,140 of them were committed by men and 1,496,050 being committed by women.

=== Youth arrests ===
In 2024, 322,406 people who were 17 and under were arrested nationally regardless of offense.

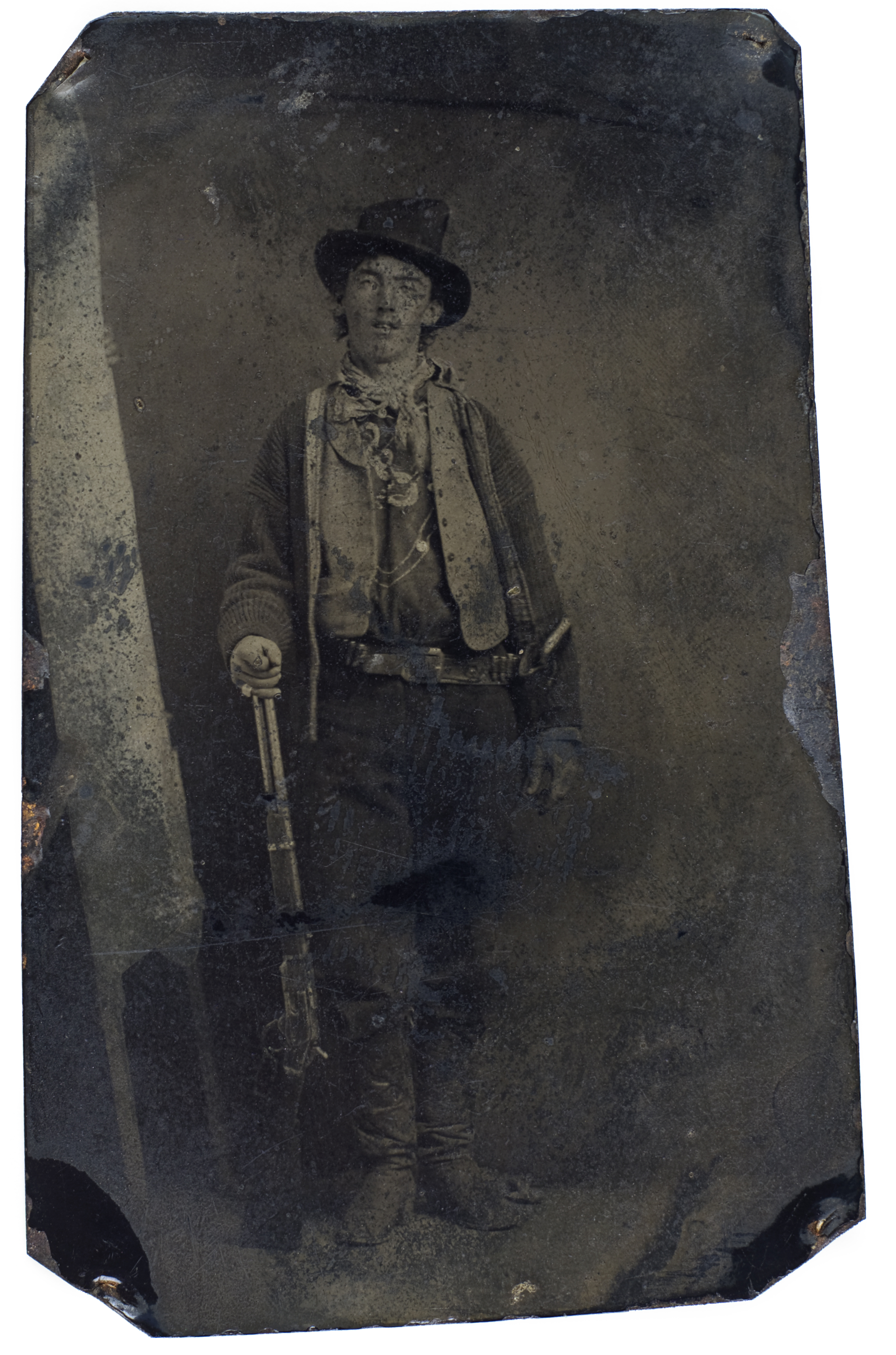
Tintype of Henry McCarty, alias William H. Bonney, better known as Billy the Kid

== Arrests by immigration status ==
Although many Americans believe that immigrants are more likely to commit crimes, undocumented immigrants have substantially lower crime rates than native-born citizens. Compared to undocumented immigrants, US-born citizens are over twice as likely to be arrested for violent crimes, 2.5 times more likely to be arrested for drug crimes, and over 4 times more likely to be arrested for property crimes. Furthermore, there is no evidence that the rate of criminality among undocumented immigrants has increased in recent years. The numbers above are from Texas, which is the only state that collects arrests by immigration status. However, according to researchers at the CATO Institute, there is evidence that a similar relationship holds nationwide.

Using incarceration rates as a proxy for criminality, immigrants are 60% less likely to be incarcerated than U.S. born citizens. According to the last 150 years of U.S. Census data, immigrants have been incarcerated at a consistently lower rate than US-born citizens throughout this time period, and this gap has widened since 1960.

According to the Migration Policy Institute, a study showed U.S.-born citizens as "ten times more likely than immigrants to be incarcerated for committing weapons-related offenses, five times more likely for violent offenses, more than twice as likely for property crimes, and nearly twice as likely for drug offenses".

== Influences on crime ==
=== Childhood exposure to violence ===
A 1997 report from the US Department of Justice states that "Most violent behavior is learned behavior. Early exposure to violence in the family may involve witnessing either violence or physical abuse.", with exposure to this violence in childhood linked to an increase in violent behaviour as an adolescent by as much as 40%. Gangs and illegal markets provide high levels of exposure to violence, and violent role models and positive rewards for criminal and violent activity, such as drug distribution. Gangs are more likely to be active in poor, minority and disorganized neighborhoods; which have further effects on violent crime; as in those communities there are usually fewer or limited opportunities for employment and evidence suggests these neighbourhoods inhibit the normal progression of adolescent development.

According to the FBI Uniform Crime Reporting statistics in 2019, juveniles (0–17 years) represented 7.13% of arrests (adults: 92.87%); this is down from 12.65% in 2010, with the total number of arrests of juveniles down by 55.5%; this is explained by the drop in arrests of all ages by 21.0%. When controlled for age, (Note: Using Office of Juvenile Justice and Delinquency Prevention (OJJDP) statistics, juvenile population in 2010 was 74,122,633, and in 2019 was 73,088,675) the rate of juveniles arrests in 2010 was 1,296 per 100,000, and in 2019 was 586 per 100,000. Data shows that total arrests increase tenfold from ages 12–14 and then double roughly every 3 years in age from age 14 reaching a peak by age 19 that remains relatively constant until 35.

=== Crime type and severity ===
People are more likely to fear and be less sympathetic toward offenders with a history of violent or sexual crime. Violent criminal history is defined by the FBI as any offense, of a violent felony, including rape, homicide, aggravated assault, and robbery. People tend to express more negative attitude towards violent offenders in comparison to those with a history of non-violent crime, misdemeanors, and no sexual crimes.

== Crime victimology ==
The U.S. accounts for 97% of gun-related child deaths among similar countries, despite making up only 46% of this group's overall population (2020).

Homicide victimization rate for whites and blacks, according to the US Bureau of Justice Statistics

Gun-related suicides and homicides in the United States (1999-2023)

In 2011, surveys indicated more than 5.8 million violent victimizations and 17.1 million property victimizations took place in the United States; according to the Bureau of Justice Statistics, each property victimization corresponded to one household, while violent victimizations is the number of victims of a violent crime.

Patterns are found within the victimology of crime in the United States. Overall, people with lower incomes, those younger than 25, and non-whites were more likely to report being the victim of crime. Income, gender, and age had the most dramatic effect on the chances of a person being victimized by crime, while the characteristic of race depended upon the crime being committed.

In terms of gender, the BJS National Crime Victimization Survey (NCVS) published in 2019 that "the percentage of violent victimizations reported to police was higher for females (46%) than for males (36%)". This difference can largely be attributed to the reporting of simple assaults, as the percentages of violent victimizations reported to police, excluding simple assault, were similar for females (47%) and males (46%). The victim-to-population ratio of 1.0 for both males and females shows that the percentage of violent incidents involving male (49%) or female (51%) victims was equal to males' (49%) or females' (51%) share of the population.

In regards to rape, the National Incident-Based Reporting System (NIBRS) indicates females are disproportionately more affected than males. According to the data collected from 2010 to 2020, women make 89% of victims of rape, while men make 11%. Perpetrators are 93% men.

Concerning age, those younger than twenty-five were more likely to fall victim to crime, especially violent crime. The chances of being victimized by violent crime decreased far more substantially with age than the chances of becoming the victim of property crime. For example, 3.03% of crimes committed against a young person were theft, while 20% of crimes committed against an elderly person were theft.

Bias motivation reports showed that of the 7,254 hate crimes reported in 2011, 47.7% (3,465) were motivated by race, with 72% (2,494) of race-motivated incidents being anti-black. In addition, 20.8% (1,508) of hate crimes were motivated by sexual orientation, with 57.8% (871) of orientation-motivated incidents being anti-male homosexual.

The third largest motivation factor for hate crime was religion, representing 18.2% (1,318) incidents, with 62.2% (820) of religion-motivated incidents being anti-Jewish.

As of 2007, violent crime against homeless people is increasing.

The likelihood of falling victim to crime relates to both demographic and geographic characteristics.

In 2010, according to the UNODC, 67.5% of all homicides in the United States were perpetrated using a firearm. The costliest crime in terms of total financial impact on all of its victims, and the most underreported crime is rape, in the United States.

== Incarceration ==
Incarceration rates by state. From various years; latest available as of June 2024. State, federal, and local inmates.

This article has lists of U.S. states and U.S. territories by incarceration and correctional supervision rates. There are also counts of inmates for various categories. The data is from the United States Department of Justice and other sources. The incarceration numbers include sentenced and unsentenced inmates from many categories.

The United States has the highest incarceration rate in the world (which includes pre-trial detainees and sentenced prisoners). As of 2009, 2.3 million people were incarcerated in the United States, including federal and state prisons and local jails, creating an incarceration rate of 793 persons per 100,000 of national population. During 2011, 1.6 million people were incarcerated under the jurisdiction of federal and state authorities. At the end of 2011, 492 persons per 100,000 U.S. residents were incarcerated in federal and state prisons. Of the 1.6 million state and federal prisoners, nearly 1.4 million people were under state jurisdiction, while 215,000 were under federal jurisdiction. Demographically, nearly 1.5 million prisoners were male, and 115,000 were female, while 581,000 prisoners were black, 516,000 were white, and 350,000 were Hispanic.

Among the 1.35 million sentenced state prisoners in 2011, 725,000 people were incarcerated for violent crimes, 250,000 were incarcerated for property crimes, 237,000 people were incarcerated for drug crimes, and 150,000 were incarcerated for other offenses. Of the 200,000 sentenced federal prisoners in 2011, 95,000 were incarcerated for drug crimes, 69,000 were incarcerated for public order offenses, 15,000 were incarcerated for violent crimes, and 11,000 were incarcerated for property crimes.

== International comparison ==
Among 15 high-income countries, the U.S. has both the highest homicide rate, and the largest number of homicides (chart shows homicide data for 2021 in selected countries).

The manner in which the United States' crime rate compares to other countries of similar wealth and development depends on the nature of the crime used in the comparison. Overall crime statistic comparisons are difficult to conduct, as the definition and categorization of crimes varies across countries. Thus an agency in a foreign country may include crimes in its annual reports which the U.S. omits, and vice versa.

However, some countries such as Canada have similar definitions of what constitutes a violent crime, and nearly all countries had the same definition of the characteristics that constitutes a homicide. Overall the total crime rate of the United States is higher than developed countries, specifically Europe and East Asia, with South American countries and Russia being the exceptions. Some types of reported property crime in the U.S. survey as lower than in Germany or Canada, yet the homicide rate in the United States is substantially higher as is the prison population.

The difference in homicide rate between the U.S. and other high income countries has widened in recent years especially since the 30% rise in 2020 was not replicated elsewhere, and is also above many developing countries such as China, India and Turkey. In the European Union, homicides fell 32% between 2008 and 2019 to 3,875 while rising by 4,901 in the U.S. in 2020 alone, leaving the U.S. with a homicide rate 7x higher. In reputable estimates of crime across the globe, the U.S. generally ranks slightly below the middle, roughly 70th lowest or 100th highest.

=== Violent crime ===
The reported U.S. violent crime rate includes murder, rape and sexual assault, robbery, and assault, whereas the Canadian violent crime rate includes all categories of assault, including Assault level 1 (i.e., assault not using a weapon and not resulting in serious bodily harm). A Canadian government study concluded that direct comparison of the two countries' violent crime totals or rates was "inappropriate".

France does not count minor violence such as punching or slapping as assault, whereas Austria, Germany, Finland and the United Kingdom do count such occurrences.

The United Kingdom similarly has different definitions of what constitutes violent crime compared to the United States, making a direct comparison of the overall figure flawed. The FBI's Uniform Crime Reports defines a "violent crime" as one of four specific offenses: murder and non-negligent manslaughter, forcible rape, robbery, and aggravated assault. The British Home Office, by contrast, has a different definition of violent crime, including all "crimes against the person", including simple assaults, all robberies, and all "sexual offenses", as opposed to the FBI, which only counts aggravated assaults and "forcible rapes".

Crime rates are necessarily altered by averaging neighborhood higher or lower local rates over a larger population which includes the entire city. Having small pockets of dense crime may increase a city's average crime rate. It is estimated that violent crime accounts for as much as $2.2 trillion by the Pacific Institute for Research and Evaluation, accounting for about 85% of the total cost of crime in the United States.

Police-recorded violent crime rates per 100,000 population
Country	Homicide	Rape	Sexual assault	Robbery	Assault
Australia	1.0 (0.8) ^{2022}*	—^{†}	123.7^{2022}^{†}	36.75 ^{2022}	1017.6^{#} ^{2022}
Germany	0.8	9.4^{2010}	56.9^{2010}	60	630
England/Wales	1.1	28.8^{2010}	82.1^{2010}	137	730
Scotland	1.6	17.0^{2009}	124.6^{2009}	48	1487
United States	5.0	44.4^{2018 UCR}	270.0 ^{2018 NCVS}^{^}	133	241
Sweden	1.0	63.5^{2010}	183.0^{2010}	103	927

*Australian homicide statistics include murder, and manslaughter (attempted murder is excluded). Murder rate in brackets.

†Australian statistics record only sexual assault, and do not have separate statistics for rape only. Sexual assault is defined to include rape, attempted rape, aggravated sexual assault (assault with a weapon), indecent assault, penetration by objects, forced sexual activity that did not end in penetration and attempts to force a person into sexual activity; but excludes unwanted sexual touching.

^{#}Australian assault statistics calculated using per state/territory statistics, excluding Victoria as assault data is not collected.

^{^UCR rape statistics do NOT include sexual assault, while the NCVS does, furthermore NCVS define sexual assault to include as well sexual touching with/without force, and verbal threats of rape or sexual assault, as well as rape, attempted rape, and sexual assault that isn't rape.}

==== Homicide ====
Since 1900, US homicide rates have varied by a factor of more than 2.

2019 Intentional homicide rate per 100,000 residents by state, including District of Columbia, 2019

Violent crime in the United States has been in decline since colonial times. The homicide rate has been estimated to be over 30 per 100,000 people in 1700, dropping to under 20 by 1800, and to under 10 by 1900, though these estimates, particularly the older ones, should be regarded as highly speculative.

According to a 2013 report by the United Nations Office on Drugs and Crime (UNODC), between 2005 and 2012, the average homicide rate in the U.S. was 4.9 per 100,000 inhabitants compared to the average rate globally, which was 6.2. However, the U.S. had much higher murder rates compared to four other selected "developed countries", which all had average homicide rates of 0.8 per 100,000. In 2004, there were 5.5 homicides for every 100,000 persons, roughly three times as high as Canada (1.9) and six times as high as Germany and Italy (0.9).

In 2018, the US murder rate was 5.0 per 100,000, for a total of 15,498 murders. The United States has experienced crime dynamics similar to many other Western countries, including a marked increase in violent crime in the 1970s and 1980s, followed by a crime drop since then, also a common pattern in Western Europe. This crime dynamics was somewhat different in Eastern Europe, where the peak in violent crime was reached in the 1990s, after the fall of the Iron Curtain, where the Revolutions of 1989 and the dissolution of the Soviet Union were followed by a period of socioeconomic turmoil, and crime in the 1990s in post-Soviet states reached high levels. Russia reached a homicide peak of 32.16 per 100,000 in 1994. In the United States, the highest homicide rate in recent history was reached in 1980, at 10.2 per 100,000.

Homicide rates vary considerably by country. According to UNDOC, the homicide rate per 100,000 (data from 2022 or 2023) is above 40 per 100,000 in Jamaica, Ecuador, South Africa and Haiti, but lower than 0.2 per 100,000 in Singapore, Qatar and Oman. In the European Union, the homicide rate is 0.9 per 100,000 (as of 2020), but it varies by country, with Latvia having the highest homicide rate at 4.9 per 100,000. In Europe, outside the European Union, the highest homicide rate is in Russia (6.7 per 100,000, as of 2021).

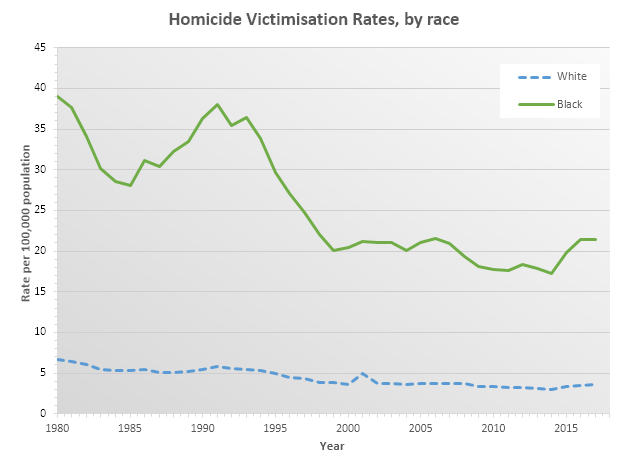
US homicide victims by race, 1980–2017

In the United States, the number of homicides where the victim and offender relationship was undetermined has been increasing since 1999 but has not reached the levels experienced in the early 1990s. In 14% of all murders, the victim and the offender were strangers. Spouses and family members made up about 15% of all victims, about one-third of the victims were acquaintances of the assailant, and the victim and offender relationship was undetermined in over one-third of homicides. Gun involvement in homicides were gang-related homicides which increased after 1980, homicides that occurred during the commission of a felony which increased from 55% in 1985 to 77% in 2005, homicides resulting from arguments which declined to the lowest levels recorded recently, and homicides resulting from other circumstances which remained relatively constant. Because gang killing has become a normal part of inner cities, many including police hold preconceptions about the causes of death in inner cities. When a death is labeled gang-related it lowers the chances that it will be investigated and increases the chances that the perpetrator will remain at large. In addition, victims of gang killings often determine the priority a case will be given by police. Jenkins (1988) argues that many serial murder cases remain unknown to police and that cases involving Black offenders and victims are especially likely to escape official attention.

According to the FBI, "When the race of the offender was known, 53.0 percent were black, 44.7 percent were white, and 2.3 percent were of other races. The race was unknown for 4,132 offenders. (Based on Expanded Homicide Data Table 3). Of the offenders for whom gender was known, 88.2 percent were male." According to the U.S. Bureau of Justice Statistics, from 1980 to 2008, 84 percent of white homicide victims were killed by white offenders and 93 percent of black homicide victims were killed by black offenders.

==== Gun violence ====
Gun homicide rate vs gun ownership rate in developed countries

Civilian guns per capita by country, Small Arms Survey 2017

The United States has the highest rate of civilian gun ownership per capita. According to the CDC, between 1999 and 2014 there were 185,718 homicides from use of a firearm and 291,571 suicides using a firearm. The U.S. gun homicide rate in 2019 was 18 times the average rate in other developed countries. Despite a significant increase in the sales of firearms since 1994, the US has seen a drop in the annual rate of homicides using a firearm from 7.0 per 100,000 population in 1993 to 3.6 per 100,000 in 2013.

=== Property crime ===
Burglary rates, select industrialized countries, U.S. Bureau of Justice Statistics

According to a 2004 study by the Bureau of Justice Statistics, looking at the period from 1981 to 1999, the United States had a lower surveyed residential burglary rate in 1998 than Scotland, England, Canada, the Netherlands, and Australia. The other two countries included in the study, Sweden and Switzerland, had only slightly lower burglary rates. For the first nine years of the study period the same surveys of the public showed only Australia with rates higher than the United States. The authors noted various problems in doing the comparisons including infrequent data points. (The United States performed five surveys from 1995 to 1999 when its rate dipped below Canada's, while Canada ran a single telephone survey during that period for comparison.)

=== Crimes against children ===
Violence against children from birth to adolescence is considered a "global phenomenon that takes many forms (physical, sexual, emotional), and occurs in many settings, including the home, school, community, care, and justice systems, and over the Internet."

According to a 2001 report from UNICEF, the United States has the highest rate of deaths from child abuse and neglect of any industrialized nation, at 2.4 per 100,000 children; France has 1.4, Japan 1, UK 0.9 and Germany 0.8. According to the US Department of Health, the state of Texas has the highest death rate, at 4.1 per 100,000 children, New York has 2.5, Oregon 1.5 and New Hampshire 0.4. A 2018 report from the Congressional Research Service stated, at the national level, violent crime and homicide rates have increased each year from 2014 to 2016.

In 2016, data from the National Child Abuse and Neglect Data System (NCANDS) revealed that approximately 1,750 children died from either abuse or neglect; further, this is a continuing trend with an increasing 7.4% of crimes against children from 2012 to 2016 and these statistics can be compared to a rate of 2.36 children per 100,000 children in the United States general population. In addition, 44.2% of these 2016 statistics are specific to physical abuse towards a child.

A 2016 report from the Child Welfare Information Gateway also showed that parents account for 78% of violence against children in the United States.

==== Human trafficking ====
Human trafficking is categorized into the following three groups: (1) sex trafficking; (2) sex and labor trafficking; and (3) labor trafficking; In addition, the rate of domestic minor sex trafficking has exponentially increased over the years. Sex trafficking of children also referred to as commercial sexual exploitation of children, is categorized by the following forms: pornography, prostitution, child sex tourism, and child marriage. Profiles of traffickers and types of trafficking differ in the way victims are abducted, how they are treated, and the reason for the abduction.

In the year 2016, the vast majority (84.9%) of traffickers were men, with an average age of 36. Approximately 70% of the offenders were citizens of the United States, and nearly half (49.4%) had minimal or no previous criminal record.

According to a 2017 report from the National Human Trafficking Hotline (NHTH), out of 10,615 reported survivors of sex trafficking, 2,762 of those survivors were minors.

The U.S. Department of Justice defines Commercial Sexual Exploitation of Children (CSEC) as a range of crimes and activities involving the sexual abuse or exploitation of a child for the financial benefit of any person or in exchange for anything of value (including monetary and non-monetary benefits) given or received by any person. These crimes against children, which may occur at any time or place, rob them of their childhood and are extremely detrimental to their emotional and psychological development.

===== Types of human sex trafficking =====
In pimp-controlled trafficking, the pimp typically is the only trafficker involved who has full physical, psychological and emotional control over the victim. In gang-controlled trafficking, a large group of people has power over the victim, forcing the victim to take part in illegal or violent tasks for the purpose of obtaining drugs. Another form is called Familial trafficking, which differs the most from the two mentioned above because the victim is typically not abducted. Instead, the victim is forced into being sexually exploited by family members in exchange for something of monetary value, whether that's paying back debt, or obtaining drugs or money. This type of sexual exploitation tends to be the most difficult to detect, yet remains as the most prevalent form of human sex trafficking within the United States.

In 2009, the Office of Juvenile Justice and Delinquency Prevention reported that the average age when children first fall victim to CSEC is between ages 12 and 14. However, this age has become increasingly younger due to exploiters' fear of contracting HIV or AIDS from older victims.

In 2018, the Office of Public Affairs within the Department of Justice released a report from operation "Broken Heart" conducted by Internet Crimes Against Children (ICAC) task forces, stating that more than 2,300 suspected online child sex offenders were arrested on the following allegations:

1. produce, distribute, receive and possess child pornography
2. engage in online enticement of children for sexual purposes
3. engage in the sex trafficking of children
4. travel across state lines or to foreign countries and sexually abuse children

A 2011 report by the Bureau of Justice Statistics examining the characteristics of suspected human trafficking incidents from 2008-10 noted that roughly 94% of confirmed victims identified as female and over half were 17 years old or younger.

== Geography of crime ==
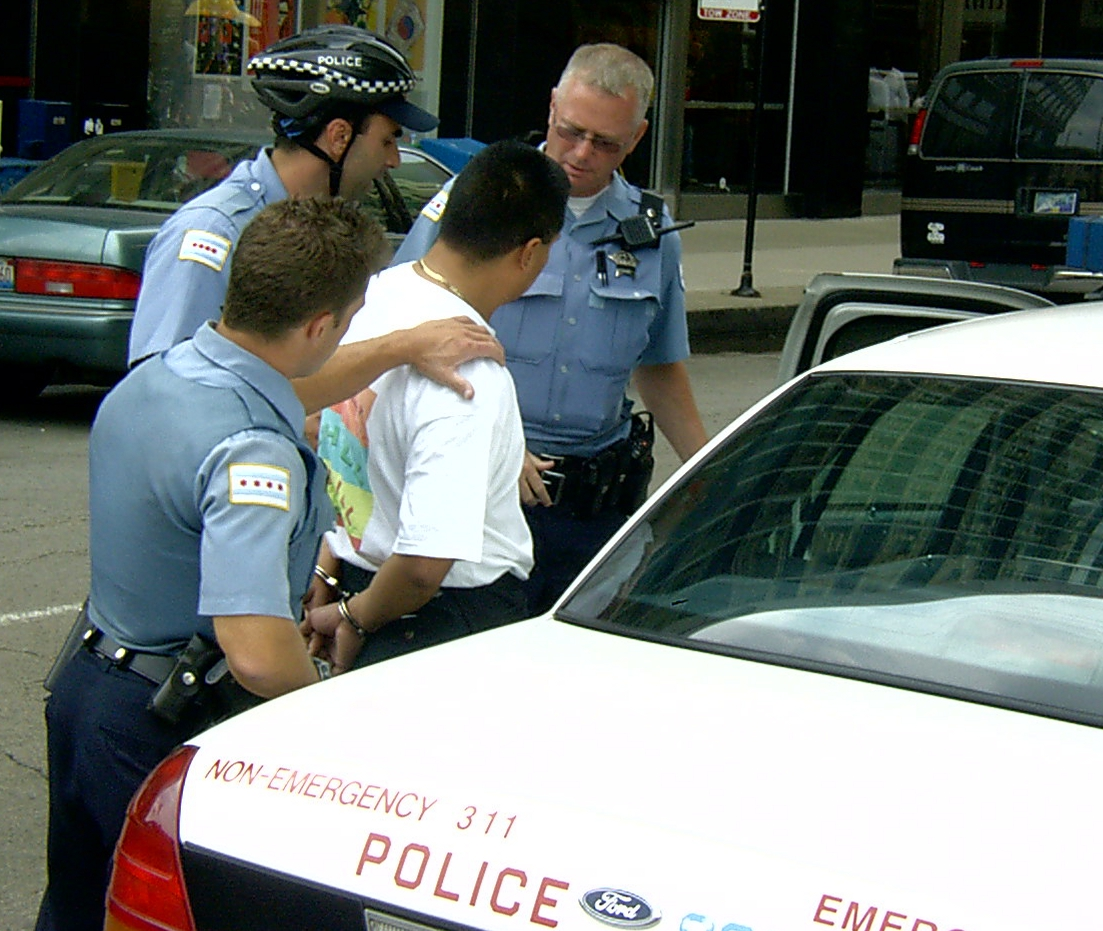
Police officers arresting a man in Chicago, 2004

Crime rates vary in the United States depending on the type of community. Within metropolitan statistical areas, both violent and property crime rates are higher than the national average; in cities located outside metropolitan areas, violent crime was lower than the national average, while property crime was higher. For rural areas, both property and violent crime rates were lower than the national average.

=== Regions ===
For regional comparisons, the FBI divides the United States into four regions: Northeast, Midwest, South, and West. For 2019, the region with the lowest violent crime rate was the Northeast, with a rate of 292.4 per 100,000 residents, while the region with the highest violent crime rate was the West, with a rate of 413.5 per 100,000. For 2019, the region with the lowest property crime rate was the Northeast, with a rate of 1,350.4 per 100,000 residents, while the region with the highest property crime rate was the West, with a rate of 2,411.7 per 100,000.

=== States ===
Crime rates vary among U.S. states. In 2019, the state with the lowest violent crime rate was Maine, with a rate of 115.2 per 100,000 residents, while the state with the highest violent crime rate was Alaska, with a rate of 867.1 per 100,000. However, the District of Columbia, the U.S. capital district, had a violent crime rate of 1,049.0 per 100,000 in 2019. In 2019, the state with the highest property crime rate was Louisiana, with a rate of 3,162.0 per 100,000, while the state with the lowest property crime rate was Massachusetts, with a rate of 1,179.8 per 100,000. However, Puerto Rico, an unincorporated territory of the United States, had a property crime rate of 702.7 per 100,000 in 2011.

=== Metropolitan areas ===
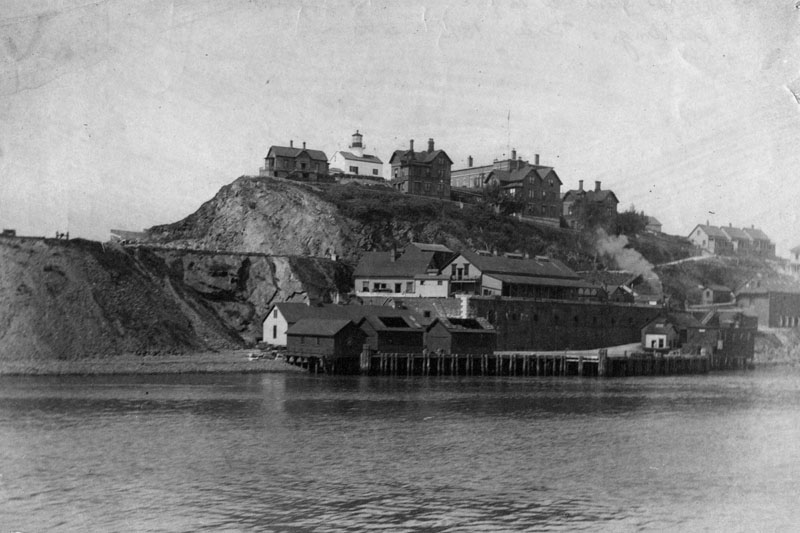
Alcatraz Island, 1895

Crime in metropolitan statistical areas tends to be above the national average; however, wide variance exists among and within metropolitan areas. Some responding jurisdictions report very low crime rates, while others have considerably higher rates; these variations are due to many factors beyond population. FBI crime statistics publications strongly caution against comparison rankings of cities, counties, metropolitan statistical areas, and other reporting units without considering factors other than simply population. For 2017, the metropolitan statistical area with the highest violent crime rate was the Memphis, Tennessee, metropolitan area, with a rate of 1168.3 per 100,000 residents, while the metropolitan statistical area with the lowest violent crime rate was Bangor, Maine, metropolitan area, with a rate of 65.8.

According to Jeffrey Ross, isolated, underserved urban communities tend to perpetuate criminality and gang violence. In the United States, it is common for crime to be concentrated in a small number of economically disadvantaged areas, which may remain persistently afflicted by crime no matter which ethnic group is living there.

Crime in ten largest metropolitan areas (2017)
Metropolitan statistical area	Violent crime rate (per 100,000)	Property crime rate (per 100,000)
Atlanta-Sandy Springs-Roswell, GA MSA	367.6	2,865.7
Boston-Cambridge-Newton, MA-NH MSA	305.3	1,308.5
Chicago-Naperville-Elgin, IL-IN-WI MSA	—N/a (Note: "The FBI determined that the agency's data were overreported for some parts of the metro area." And some agency(s) "submitted rape data classified according to the legacy UCR definition.")	2,024.6
Dallas-Fort Worth-Arlington, TX MSA	369.3	—N/a (Note: "The FBI determined that the agency's data were overreported for some parts of the metro area.")
Houston-The Woodlands-Sugar Land, TX MSA	593.1	—N/a (Note: "The FBI determined that the agency's data were underreported for some parts of the metro area.")
Los Angeles-Long Beach-Anaheim, CA MSA	496.7	2,350.3
Miami-Fort Lauderdale-West Palm Beach, FL MSA	458.2	3,076.4
New York-Newark-Jersey City, NY-NJ-PA MSA	332.9	1,335.6
Philadelphia-Camden-Wilmington, PA-NJ-DE-MD MSA	428.7	2,055.6
Washington-Arlington-Alexandria, DC-VA-MD-WV MSA	273.4	1,745.4

== Number and growth of criminal laws ==
There are conflicting opinions on the number of federal crime laws, with some arguing that there are now too many laws. In 1982, the U.S. Justice Department could not come up with a number, but estimated 3,000 crimes in the United States Code. In 1998, the American Bar Association (ABA) said that it was likely much higher than 3,000, but didn't give a specific estimate. In 2008, the Heritage Foundation published a report that put the number at a minimum of 4,450. When staff for a task force of the U.S. House Judiciary Committee asked the Congressional Research Service (CRS) to update its 2008 calculation of criminal offenses in the United States Code in 2013, the CRS responded that they lack the staffing and resources to accomplish the task.

== See also ==
- Corruption in the United States
- Fear of crime
- Illegal drug trade in the United States
- List of drug cartels in the United States
- Mass shootings in the United States
- Race and crime in the United States
  - Criminal stereotype of African Americans
- Interstate Identification Index
- List of United States cities by crime rate
- Strict liability (criminal) § United States
- Contempt of court § United States
- List of criminal enterprises, gangs and syndicates § United States
- Terrorism in the United States
