= Evening economy =

Public leisure in a local economy

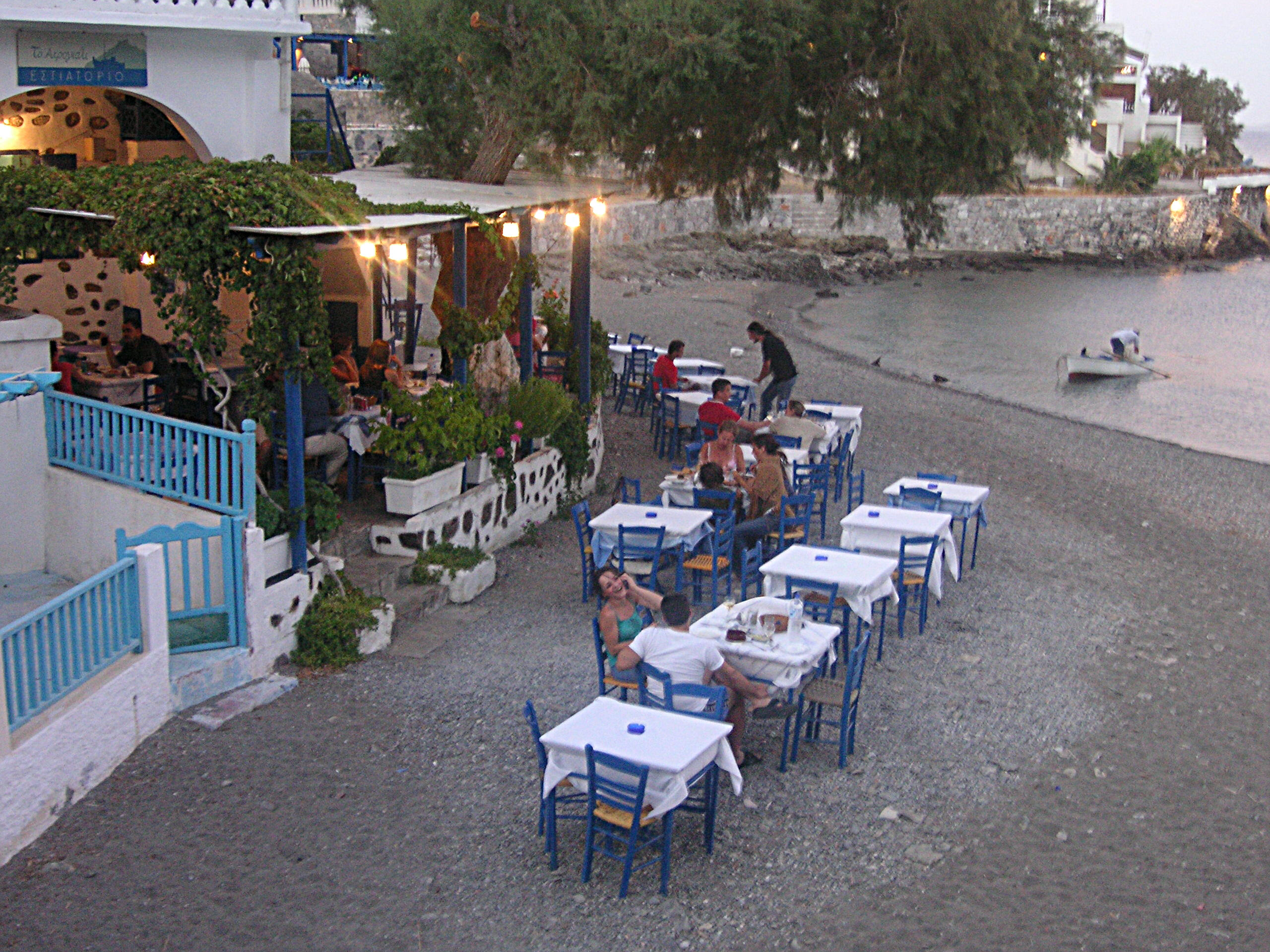
An example of evening economic activity - a restaurant in Greece.

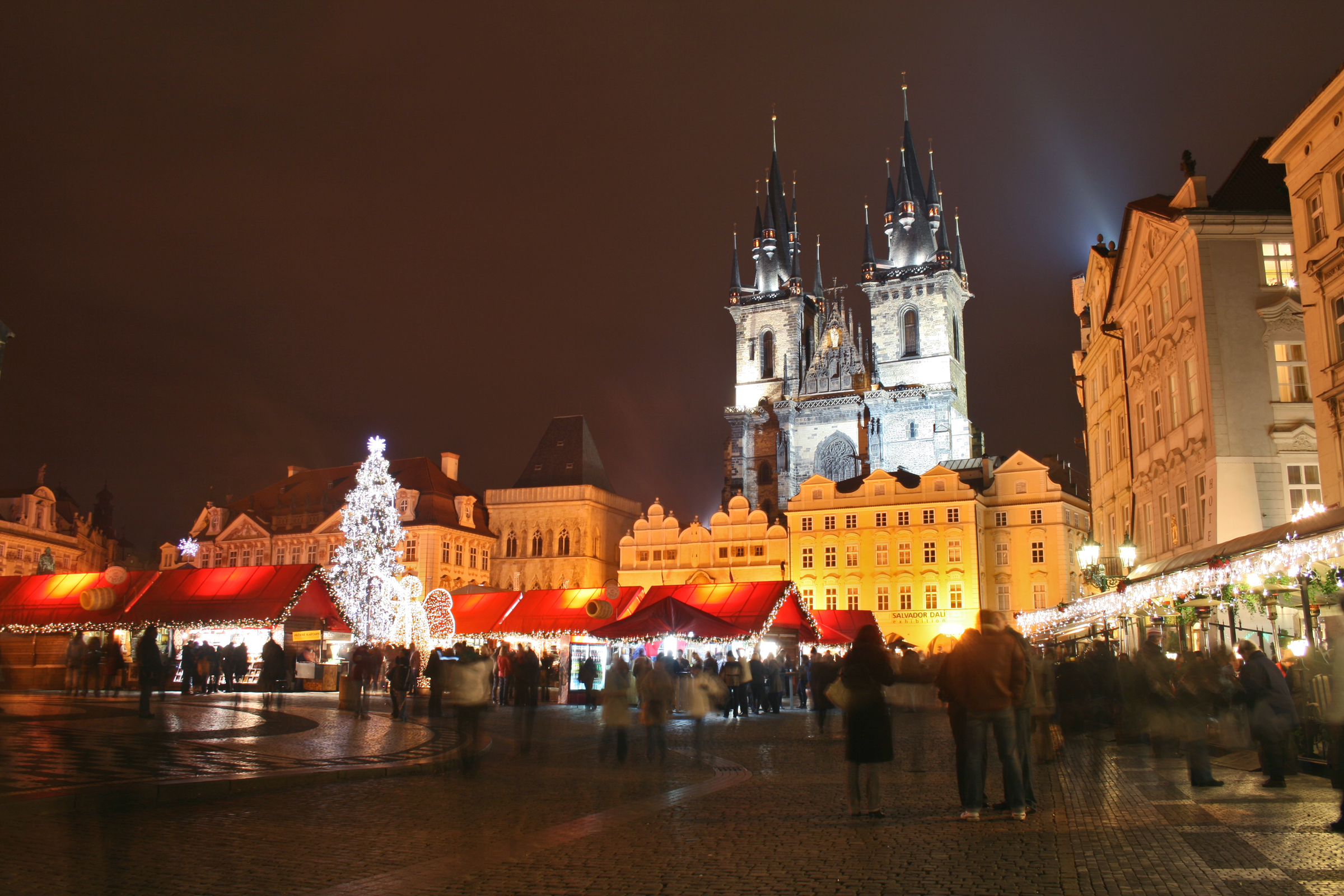
Prague has a strong evening economy. Shown here are the Christmas markets after dark.

In planning, the evening economy describes economic activity taking place in the evening after many people finish daytime employment or formal education, such as eating and drinking, entertainment, and nightlife (which may be described by the related term nighttime economy).

== Activities ==
The evening economy includes, but is not limited to:

- Eating out - restaurants, cafes, takeaways
- Drinking - pubs and bars
- Culture and entertainment - theatres, cinemas, live music and comedy events, ten pin bowling, ice skating
- Sport - spectator sports including football, rugby and greyhound racing often take place in the evening, especially during Mondays to Fridays.
- Healthcare, police and firefighting

== Benefits and drawbacks ==
The benefits of a significant evening economy can include:

- Recreation for people, which is often welcome after finishing work for the day
- Increased employment due to local spending
- Reduced social exclusion and increased urban vitality in towns

The drawbacks can include:

- Noise pollution
- Crime and/or anti-social behaviour, particularly where alcohol is involved
- Traffic congestion

== Regeneration ==
Evening economic activity has been used to drive urban regeneration in cities such as Manchester, Newcastle upon Tyne and Dublin.

== See also ==
- Night service (public transport)
