= Coramae Richey Mann =

Coramae Richey Mann (1931–2004) was a professor emeritus of criminal justice at the University of Illinois at Chicago. She argued vehemently that the United States criminal justice system was racist.

Mann criticized the arguments of William Wilbanks (in his book The Myth of a Racist Criminal Justice System (1987)), countering in her 1989 book Unequal Justice that Wilbanks' reliance on quantitative and statistical data hides the reality of racism.

== Early life ==
Coramae Richey-Mann was born in Chicago, Illinois on January 25, 1931. She gained undergraduate (1956) and graduate (1961) degrees in Clinical Psychology from Roosevelt University. Her doctorate in sociology (with an emphasis in Criminology) was awarded by the University of Illinois at Chicago in 1976.

== Bibliography ==
- Mann, Coramae Richey. Female Crime and Delinquency (Tuscaloosa: University of Alabama, 1984) ISBN 0-8173-0144-5
- Mann, Coramae Richey. Unequal Justice: A Question of Color (Bloomington: Indiana University, 1988) ISBN 0-253-33676-7
- Mann, Coramae Richey. When Women Kill (Albany: State University of New York, 1996) ISBN 0-7914-2812-5
- Mann, Coramae Richey; Zatz, Marjorie S. Images of Color, Images of Crime: Readings (Los Angeles: Roxbury, 1998) ISBN 1-891487-58-2

== Recognition ==
The Division on People of Color and Crime of the American Society of Criminology presents the annual Coramae Richey Mann Award recognizing professional members of the Division who have made outstanding contributions of scholarship on race/ethnicity, crime, and justice.
