= Conflict model (criminal justice) =

Criminal justice system

The conflict model of criminal justice, sometimes called the non-system perspective or system conflict theory, argues that the organizations of a criminal justice system either do, or should, work competitively to produce justice, as opposed to cooperatively.

== History ==
System conflict theory argues that worries over fame, promotions, wages, and success cause the criminal justice system to conflict with itself. This perspective argues that there is no true system and points to the role of adversarial processes, in particular, which are seen to be basic to the "system", and the fact that many criminal justice organizations habitually share as little information as possible. This school of thought is followed both by groups which argue that the conflict model is the reality of criminal justice, but the consensus model is the ideal; and groups which argue that the conflict model is both the reality and the ideal.

== See also ==
- Consensus model (criminal justice)
