= Katheryn Russell-Brown =

American social scientist and children's author (born 1961)

- Born: Katheryn K. Russell; September 17, 1961 (age 65)
- Occupations: Social scientist and children's author

Academic background
- Education: University of California at Berkeley (BA 1983); Hastings College of Law (JD 1986); University of Maryland, College Park (PhD 1992)

Academic work
- Discipline: Sociology of law
- Sub-discipline: Race and crime
- Institutions: Alabama State University (1987–1989); University of Maryland (1992–2003); University of Florida (2003–2021)

Katheryn Russell-Brown (born Katheryn K. Russell, September 17, 1961) is an American social scientist and children's author. She is emeritus professor of law and former director of the Center for the Study of Race and Race Relations at University of Florida Law School. Her main areas of expertise are race and crime, sociology of law and criminal law.

== Early life and education ==
Russell-Brown was born September 17, 1961 as Katheryn K. Russel. She received her Bachelor of Arts from the University of California at Berkeley (1983), her Juris Doctor from the Hastings College of Law (1986) and her Doctor of Philosophy from the criminology department of the University of Maryland, College Park (1992).

== Memberships ==
Russell-Brown is a member of the Academy of Criminal Justice Sciences and the American Bar Association, and has been an executive counselor to the American Society of Criminology. She also served on the editorial board of the Carolina Academic Press, as well the editorial boards of Critical Criminology and Justice Quarterly.

== Career ==
Russell-Brown became a professor in the University of Florida Levin College of Law in 2003 as professor of law and director of the Center for the Study of Race and Race Relations. She served in these positions for 18 years before retiring emeritus as a named chair, the Levin, Mabie & Levin Professor of Law. She previously taught at Alabama State University (1987–1989) and the University of Maryland (1992–2003). She held visiting appointments at Howard University (1991), the City University of New York School of Law (1994), and the Washington College of Law (1997).

Russell-Brown was cited by the Supreme Court of the United States in the case Harris v. Alabama (1995) in regard to her article "The Constitutionality of Jury Override in Alabama Death Penalty Cases" (Alabama Law Review, 1994). She was awarded a Soros Justice Advocacy Fellowship in 2009 for a project to integrate criminal justice issues into primary education curricula.

She began to write children's books later in her career, beginning with a picture book biography of Melba Liston: Little Melba and Her Big Trombone (2014). It was a finalist for the 2015 NAACP Image Award for Outstanding Literary Work in the children's category. Her later She Was the First: The Trailblazing Life of Shirley Chisholm (2020) won the 2021 Image Award.

== Works ==
=== As Katheryn K. Russell ===
- The Constitutionality of Jury Override in Alabama Death Penalty Cases (Alabama Law Review: 1994)
- The Color of Crime: Racial Hoaxes, White Fear, Black Protectionism, Police Harassment and Other Macroaggressions (New York University Press: 1998)
- Race and Crime: An Annotated Bibliography (Greenwood Press: 2000)
- Petit Apartheid in the U.S. Criminal Justice System: The Dark Figure of Racism with Dragan Milovanovic (Carolina Academic Press: 2001)

=== As Katheryn Russell-Brown ===
- Underground Codes: Race, Crime and Related Fires (New York University Press: 2004)
- Protecting Our Own: Race, Crime, and African Americans (Perspectives on Multiracial America) (Rowman & Littlefield: 2006)
- The Color of Crime (New York University Press: 2008)
- Criminal Law (SAGE: 2015)

==== Children's books ====
- Little Melba and Her Big Trombone, illustrated by Frank Morrison (Lee & Low Books: 2014)
- A Voice Named Aretha, illustrated by Laura Freeman (Bloomsbury: 2020)
- She Was the First: The Trailblazing Life of Shirley Chisholm, illustrated by Eric Velasquez (Lee & Low Books: 2020)

== See also ==
- Race and crime in the United States

== Sources ==
- Katheryn Russell-Brown at "Faculty and Staff", University of Florida Levin College of Law (Retrieved 4 October 2009) UF Levin College of Law | Faculty and Staff
- Spotlight: Katheryn Russell-Brown, University of Florida (Retrieved 4 October 2009) University of Florida Spotlight: Katheryn Russell-Brown
