= 2024–2025 Spanish anti-tourism protests =

- Date: 20 April 2024 – 15 June 2025
- Location: Canary Islands; Balearic Islands; Málaga; San Sebastián and Barcelona, Spain
- Cause: Demand legislation to stop and prevent overtourism

Beginning in April 2024, there have been protests in Spain against overtourism, specifically in the archipelagos of the Balearics and Canaries, and in the mainland cities of Barcelona, San Sebastián and Málaga. These first three locations are the top three most-visited in Spain by tourists. Following the COVID-19 pandemic limiting tourists' opportunities to travel, the numbers of visitors to Spanish destinations has significantly increased year-on-year. Local governments and residents believe that, rather than sustaining the locations, the overtourism has contributed to a reduced quality of life and increased cost of living for residents.

The BBC reported that while overtourism has concerned residents of the most-visited locations for a while, "[in 2024] it feels like something has changed. The anger among many locals is reaching a new level".

== Background ==
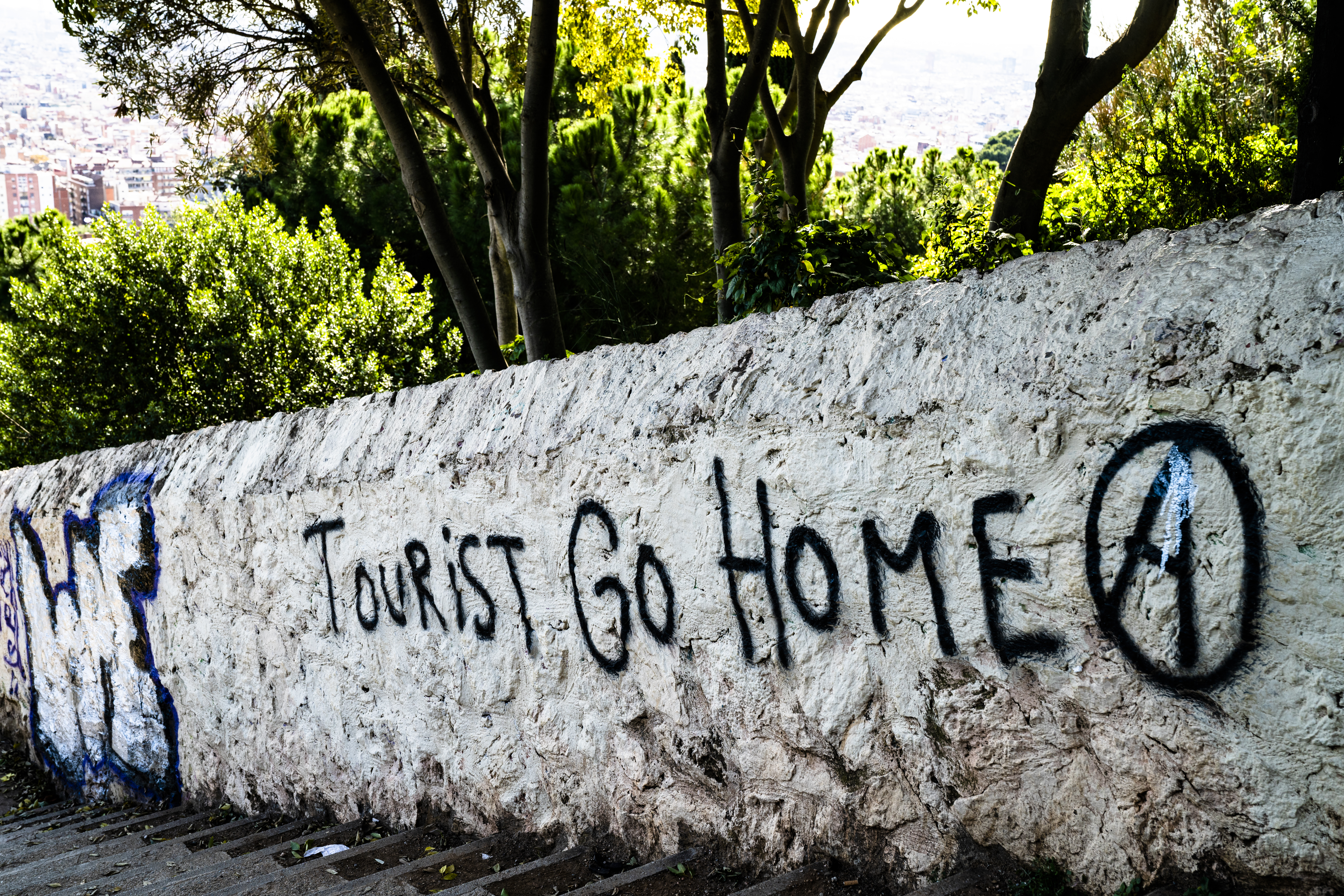
2019 graffiti in Barcelona, saying "tourist go home" followed by a circle A

Barcelona in particular is a city that has suffered from overtourism for many years. Concerns became elevated in 2018 and 2019, directed at both beach and cultural tourism, with protests and anti-tourist graffiti. Between 2007 and 2019, some areas of the city experienced a 45% decrease in resident population, largely attributed to the influence of Airbnb causing investors to purchase apartments to use as short-term rentals.

Following the COVID-19 pandemic preventing tourists from travelling, many popular tourist destinations have seen a surge in tourism and record visitor numbers as tourists return in large numbers all at once.

In April 2020, a proposal for radical change in the organisation of the city, the "Manifesto for the Reorganisation of the city after COVID-19", was published in Barcelona by architecture theorist Massimo Paolini and signed by 160 academics and 300 architects. The manifesto is radically critical towards the touristification and commodification of the city, proposing to: "eliminate cruise ships", "maintain the current dimensions of the airport", "stimulate touristic degrowth", and "eliminate any investment to promote the 'Barcelona brand'". In August 2021, Barcelona became the first city to ban short-term private room rentals.

Space is naturally limited on islands, with a growth in tourism – and the related renting of properties to tourists at inflated rates – has caused a housing crisis. By 2024, about 1,000 residents of Mallorca lived in their vehicles, as did an unspecified number of Ibiza residents. The government of the Balearic Islands since 2023 is conservative, and refused to implement the rent cap introduced by the Spanish government. In March 2024, the Balearics government began imposing severe fines for anti-social behaviour from tourists, bringing the restrictions in line with the laws on residents, as the number of tourists continued to grow and such incidents increased. In the Canary Islands in 2023, a third of residents were at risk of poverty. Since being designated European Capital of Culture in 2016, San Sebastián has experienced an accelerated process of touristification, which has had a particularly significant impact on rising housing prices and the resulting displacement of residents; among provincial capitals in the Spanish state, it has the most expensive housing market.

Some events seen as commodifying Barcelona's public spaces that were approved in 2024, including a fashion show at Park Güell and hosting the America's Cup, further increased residents' discontent.

Over the course of 2024, 94 million tourists visited Spain, compared to its 48 million population. The international tourist expenditure in 2024 was around 126 billion euros. Tourists to Spain can believe that their patronage is the main or only cause for the existence of local jobs in the areas they visit.

== Protests ==
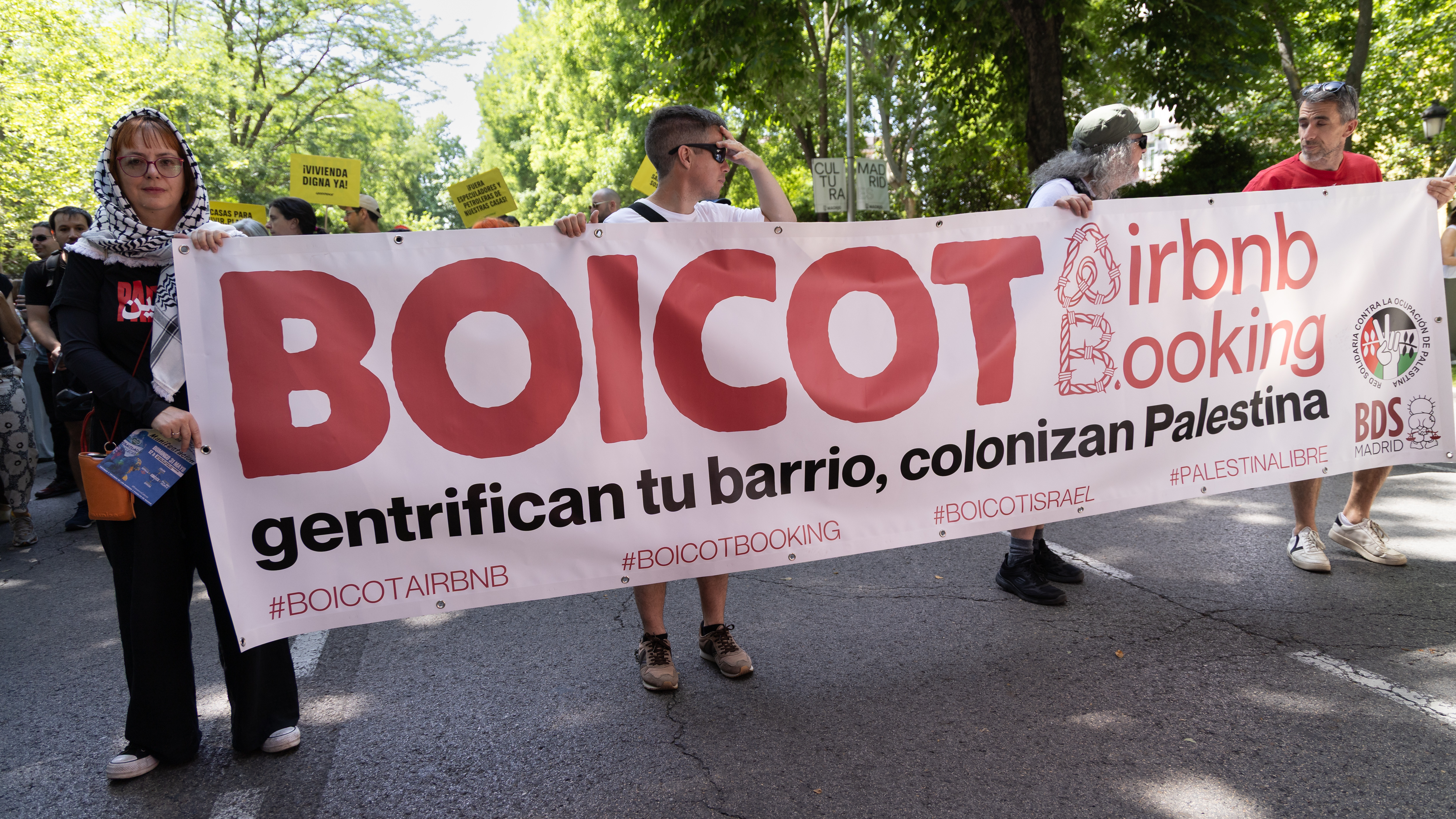
Demonstrators carry a banner calling for a boycott of Airbnb and Booking.com on the Paseo del Prado in Madrid during the housing rights march on 24 May 2026, reflecting growing public anger at the role of short-term rental platforms in reducing the supply of long-term housing in Spanish cities. The proliferation of tourist apartments listed on such platforms has been widely cited as a key driver of rent inflation and residential displacement in Madrid and other major urban centres.

In April 2024, mass protests began in the Canary Islands, with residents calling for a temporary limit on tourism until legislation to combat the negative effects of overtourism could be introduced. Between 20,000 and 50,000 people across the islands took part in coordinated protests against the excess tourism, which campaigners argue has damaged the welfare of the population and the islands' environment. The protests were backed by environmental organisations including Greenpeace and the WWF. A spokesperson for the coordination effort said that the balance of tourism and welfare had become chronically unsustainable, especially in the year before the protests. Eleven members of a protest group went on hunger strike over large luxury accommodation developments on Tenerife, which they also said were illegal. The group said they were not against tourism, but of a model of tourism that allows unsustainable growth.

On 26 May 2024, about 10,000 people protested in Palma de Mallorca, the capital of the island of Mallorca, with other protests occurring on 25 May in Mallorca as well as the smaller Balearic islands of Menorca and Ibiza. The president of the Balearic Islands, Marga Prohens, criticised relevant tourism authorities for trying to expand tourism volume instead of aiming for sustainable quality tourism. Protestors in Mallorca called on the government to prevent new residents from buying property and new tourist spots being opened. In Menorca, residents complained that the island government was ignoring the local concerns even while promoting their streets to tourists, and on Ibiza there were specific concerns about the island becoming a party hot-spot.

In July 2024, there was a protest in Barcelona of about 3,000 people. Some of the protestors used tape to seal hotel exits, and cordon-off restaurants and other tourist services in public squares, and some sprayed tourists with water guns, which the Spanish tourism minister criticised. Protestors said that the large number of visitors were the cause of price increases for goods across the city, as well as putting pressure on public services, and complained that wealth generated by tourism was not distributed and thus a cause of increased social inequality. The Assemblea de Barris pel Decreixement Turístic (Neighbourhood Association for Tourism Degrowth) published thirteen proposals to divest from tourism, including many from the 2020 manifesto.

Another large protest in Palma de Mallorca took place on the evening of 21 July, coinciding with the start of school summer breaks in England. Over 100 activist groups were set to take part in the protest, with France 24 reporting that 80 groups were involved and up to 50,000 (50,000 per the organisers, 12,000 per the island government, 20,000 per local police) protestors took part. Protestors asked for protection of natural resources, a limit on arriving flights and docking cruise ships, and to regulate non-resident accommodation, citing the escalating living costs; the overuse of resources, public spaces and public services by tourists; and a loss of cultural identity as the island becomes touristified, including things like previously traditional shops becoming multi-national chains selling (for example) ice-cream.

In 2024, residents of San Sebastián mobilised on multiple occasions to voice growing concern over the impacts of tourism and housing pressures in the city. In late May, several hundred people marched, with participation from a broad cross-section of neighbourhood associations and local groups, articulating widespread frustration that the city's economic model was prioritising short-term tourism and speculative investment over affordable housing and livability for long-term inhabitants. In autumn, participants in a larger demonstration walked through the old town and historic quarters, highlighting how rising visitor numbers and the proliferation of tourist accommodation options were exacerbating rent inflation and contributing to the displacement of residents.

These protests were part of a wider wave of actions across Spain in 2024 that saw communities in several cities take to the streets to demand more sustainable approaches to urban development, housing availability, and the social impacts of mass tourism.

In June 2025, protests against overtourism and touristification spread across several Spanish cities as part of coordinated actions in southern Europe. On 15 June 2025, large demonstrations were reported in Barcelona, where thousands of residents marched through central neighbourhoods chanting slogans such as “Your holidays, my misery”, with local police estimating around 600 participants at one demonstration and some protesters using water pistols and smoke devices to dramatise their message. Similar demonstrations occurred in other Spanish destinations, including Palma de Mallorca, Ibiza, San Sebastián and Granada, where residents voiced concerns that excessive tourism was driving up the cost of housing, straining public services and displacing local communities. Protesters in these cities joined broader actions in Portugal and Italy, arguing for stricter regulation of tourism levels and greater protections for affordable housing and community life. Organisers emphasised that their intent was not to oppose tourism per se, but to call for sustainable policy reforms in the face of what they regarded as unchecked growth in visitor numbers.

== Actions in response ==
In the Balearics in May 2024, the regional government approved 700 housing projects, including making public land available for housing development, and lowered tax on selling homes. Jaume Bauzà, tourism minister for the Balearics, said that they wanted to discourage anti-tourism, or "tourism-phobia", and that stopping illegal methods of procuring tourism would go a long way in solving this and overtourism.

In Barcelona, political measures have been taken to combat the negative effects of overtourism. In June 2024, Mayor Jaume Collboni said that he would end short-term rentals in Barcelona by 2028 – aiming to reduce the impact on the housing market of landlords renting properties at inflated rates intended for tourists – and following continued protests in July, Collboni announced plans to raise the tourist tax on cruise ship visitors to the city staying less than 12 hours. Earlier in 2024, Collboni had increased the nightly tourist tax and limited cruise ship visitors.

In response to growing concern about the impacts of tourism and housing pressure in 2024 and 2025, the San Sebastián City Council has implemented a series of municipal measures aimed at balancing tourism with residents’ quality of life. In official discourse and policy documentation, the concept of sustainable tourism has become predominant, framed by commitments to implement measures intended to be responsible towards the resident population. Measures under this framework have included limiting organised tourist group sizes to a maximum of 25 people in public spaces and associated guidelines for tour conduct to improve coexistence between visitors and locals. The municipality has also strengthened short-term rental regulation, including longstanding bans on issuing new licences in central residential districts. Despite these actions, many grassroots movements have criticised them as insufficient, arguing that they do not fully address the deepening housing crisis, rising rents, and other social effects.

== See also ==
- Tourismphobia
- 2026 Spanish housing protests
