= Touristification =

Process of a place becoming tourist-focused

Touristification is a process by which a place changes as it becomes an object of tourist consumption. It leads to negative implications for the touristified place and has received both informal and formal opposition.

Mild touristification by means of alternative tourism in rural areas and indigenous territories has been promoted by countries like Mexico as a development strategy that can be integrated with environmental conservation.

== Cause ==
Touristification has come about as transport has improved. In the modern age, it is quicker and cheaper to travel than ever, leading to more international (and national) trips such as city breaks.

== Housing ==
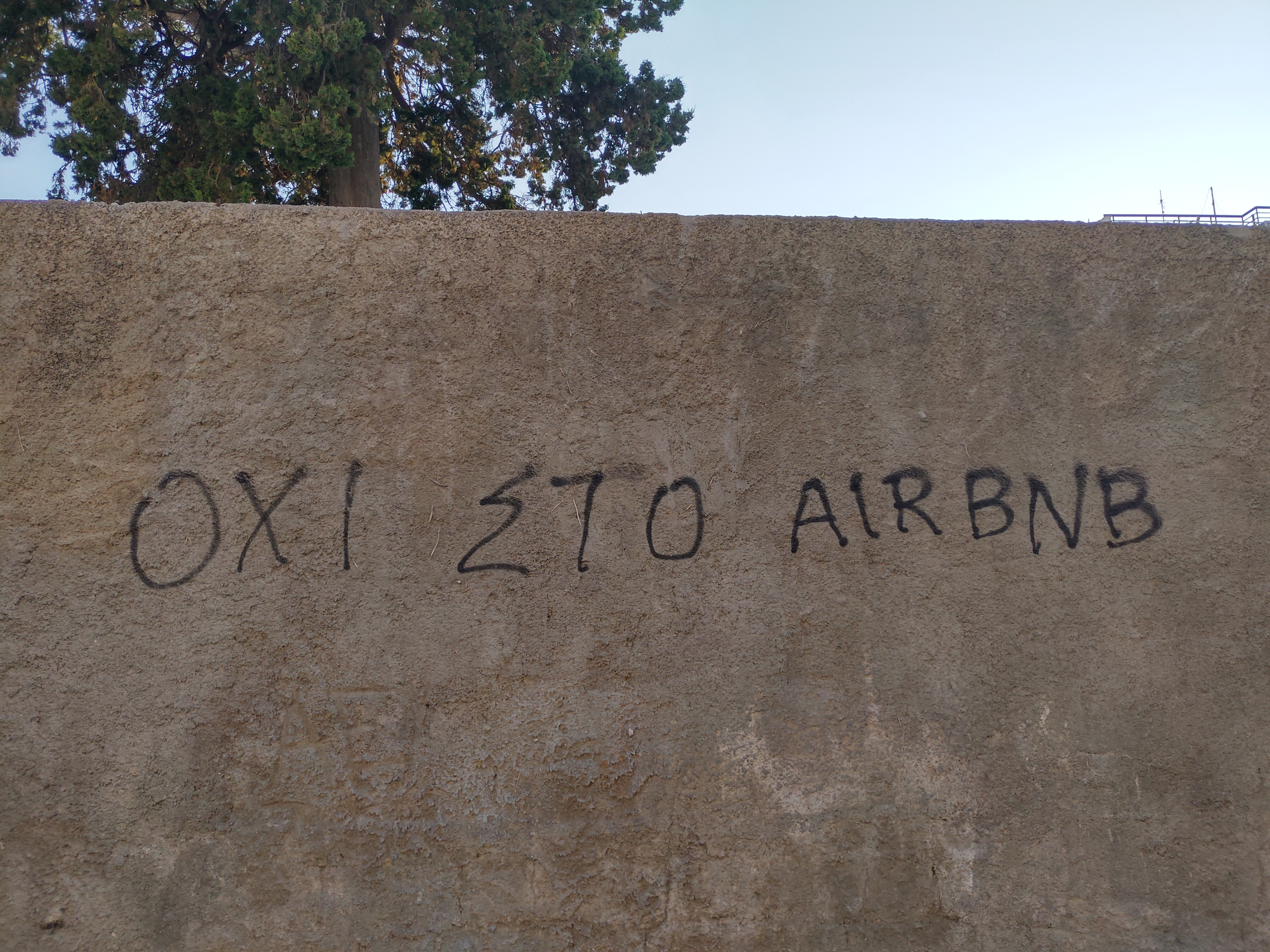
A sign in Greek saying "No to Airbnb"

The growth of the peer-to-peer rental market (platforms such as Airbnb) have led to the touristification of housing in many cities, with the peer-to-peer market now present in almost every European city. The growth in peer-to-peer holiday rentals is becoming a 'gentrification battlefront' both in the Global North and South.

In the peer-to-peer rental market, individuals can occasionally rent out the homes in which they live through a platform such as Airbnb. However, these platforms have been criticised for allowing investors and landlords to set up permanent holiday rentals in homes which would otherwise form part of the local housing stock. This is a form of gentrification, as local city dwellers are displaced from their homes (or districts) to cater for the needs of affluent (in this case, transient and mobile) people. Lestégas refers to districts which have become dominated by holiday rentals as airbnbarrios.

The production of a short-term rental housing market in cities became pivotal in the early 2000s. This came about due to the increasing importance of digital technologies in the economy, and a drive by capital to extract more value from the city.

== Solastalgia ==
Solastalgia is the collective melancholia that a community feels when its space is touristified. Solastalgic people feel deprived when their daily activities are altered or restricted to cater for a more affluent tourist class and yearn for the past pre-mass tourism.

== Opposition ==
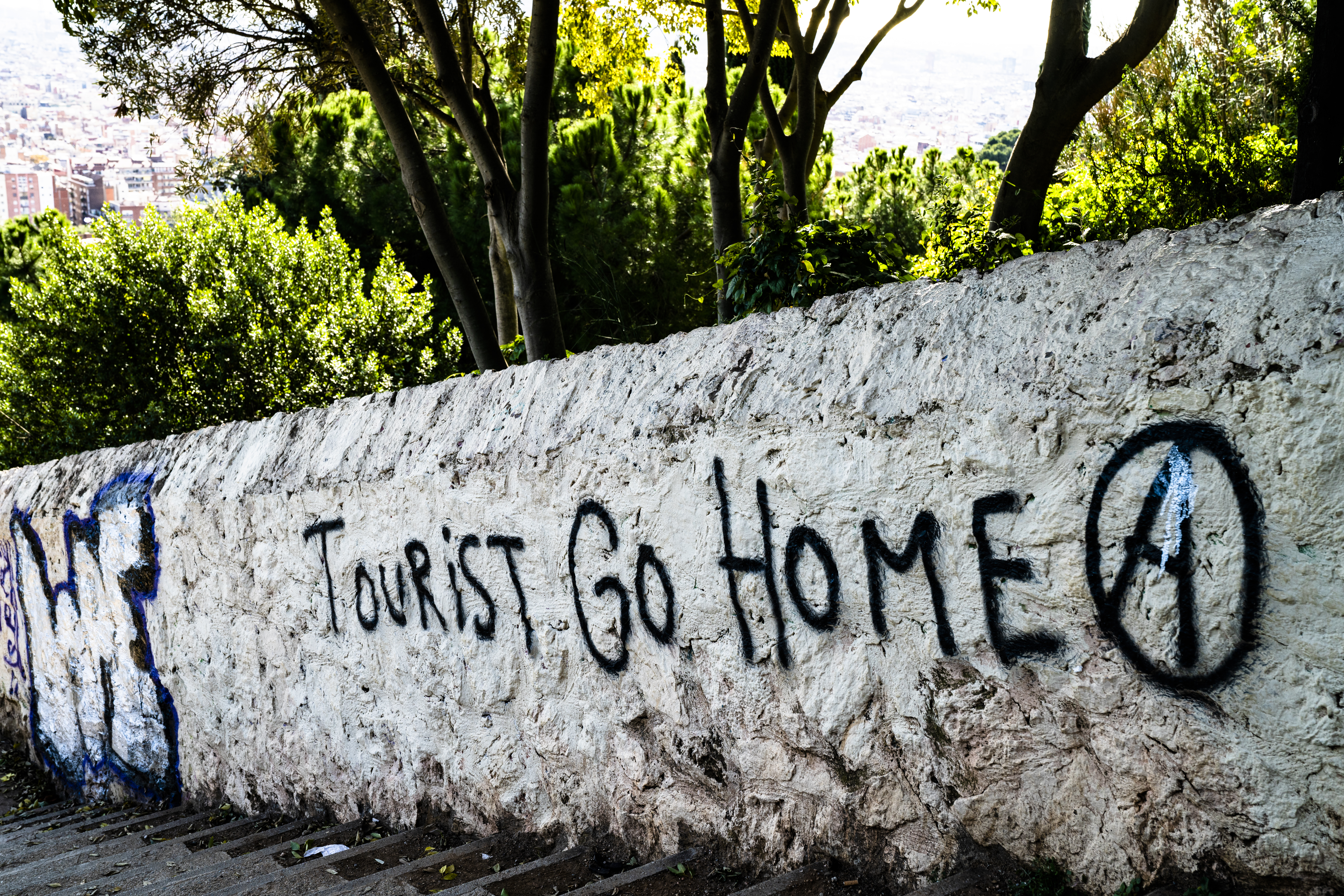
2019 graffiti in Barcelona, saying "tourist go home" followed by a circle A

Touristification has received protests from negatively affected groups. In some cities, anti-Airbnb billboards have appeared. In some cases, cities across the world have directly taken on Airbnb and similar organisations. In August 2021, Barcelona became the first city to ban short-term private room rentals. During 2024 and 2025, there were protests in Spain against overtourism.
