= Instagram tourism =

Mass tourism inspired by social media

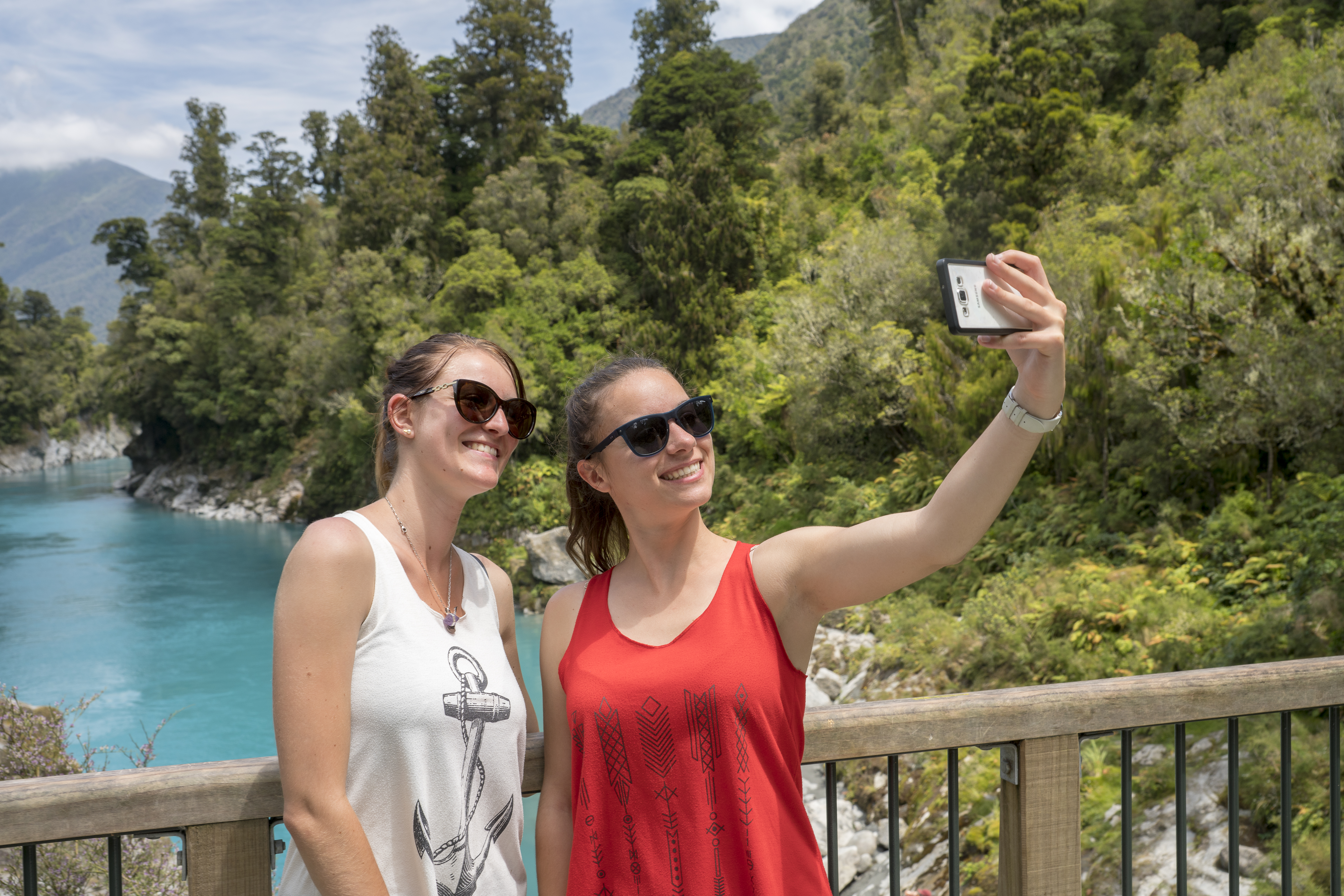
Tourists taking a selfie at Hokitika Gorge

Instagram tourism or selfie tourism is the phenomenon by which an area sees an increase in tourism, often to the point of overtourism, due to exposure on social media and the resulting desire created in others to recreate the images they've seen on Instagram or TikTok. Studies in 2018 and 2023 found that social media exposure affected tourism and connected it to the sociological concept of conspicuous consumption.

Instagram tourism is often seen in areas which lend themselves to the taking of selfies with a background of picturesque natural beauty or vibrant city scenes. It has been characterized as a superficial consumption of rather than sincere interest in a place, and those engaging in it characterized as "people coming to get a photo of the photos they've seen".

Municipalities have taken various strategies to limit the appeal of visiting to take selfies, such as erecting barriers, closing roads, and enacting fees.

== Background and analysis ==
Since around the 2010s, the growth of Instagram as a popular platform for sharing photos has fundamentally changed how travelers discover and choose travel destinations. Recent empirical research which analyzed over 139,000 Instagram posts between 2010 and 2022 for a major cultural tourism route found that photographs of "places of interest" lead to twice the engagement compared to hospitality services. Posts that featured attractive or visually striking spots that also included people had more traction as they suggested that these places were a must see destination. This created a positive feedback loop where the more photogenic a place looks, or the "Instagrammability" of a place, the more it gets shared and the more people want to visit making it a powerful factor in what destinations become popular.

According to one 2023 study, 98% of US millennials are influenced by images on social media when making travel plans. As of the early 2020s, some social media was focused on an "Instagram vs. reality" trend, which contrasts Instagram photos with ones of the "crowds and chaos common at tourism hotspots often omitted from influencers' perfectly composed images and videos".

Tourists influenced by the images on social media often make travel plans that will allow them to photograph themselves in the same way. Typically the term Instagram tourism is used in reference to those visiting primarily to take such photos and then leave, such as those on bus tours, and among day trippers and those arriving on cruise ships. In some cases those engaging in Instagram tourism are looking to recreate the exact photo they've seen on social media. According to the Irish Independent, the term Instagram tourism is "a rallying cry for those protesting the besiegement of their picturesque cities and towns by iPhone-wielding influencers".

The phenomenon has been characterized as an interest in getting a photo rather than an interest in exploring the area. The BBC has characterized Instagram tourism as "a superficial, drive-by consumption of culture and local life". NZZ characterized it as "superficial consumption and not as a true interest in the host country". According to Steve Taylor of the University of the Highlands and Islands' Centre for Recreation and Tourism Research, it is a result of "the Instagram-able nature of certain destinations, with so many people coming to get a photo of the photos they've seen".

The term "bucket list" is sometimes associated with Instagram tourism. Taylor called Instagram tourism "an aspect of bucket-list culture".

A 2018 study published in Tourism Management found that "social return" or social proof, the amount of positive feedback generated on social media by posts about travel, could be expected to predict US travelers' intentions to visit a particular location. The same study connected social media travel posts to the sociological concept of conspicuous consumption. A 2023 study published in Advances in Tourism Studies found that "social media platforms significantly influence tourists' destination choice".

== Examples ==
In the US the phenomenon has been seen at Horseshoe Bend in Arizona, Joshua Tree National Park, and Zion National Park. Pomfret, Vermont, experienced an overwhelming increase in slow-moving traffic, including tour buses that unloaded groups for brief selfie stops and influencers setting up changing booths to allow for outfit changes, after images of a local farm during leaf-peeping season went viral.

In Spain the phenomenon has been noted in the Balearic Islands. One example was Caló des Moro, which after being featured in the feed of a social media influencer became overwhelmed with thousands of visitors in an area that can accommodate approximately 100. The mayor held a press conference "plead[ing] with journalists and tour operators never to mention the cove again" and the local authority stripped its website of images of the small cove.

Social media images of Hallstatt, Austria, captioned "the most Instagrammable town in the world," went viral in Eastern and Southeastern Asia. In 2013, it was rumored in China to be the model for the movie Frozen's Arendelle village. Hallstatt in 2020 had 780 citizens and more than 10,000 visitors a day, primarily arriving via tour bus, stopping briefly for photographs, and moving on quickly. Citizens complained about tourists entering homes and private gardens to take photos.

Images of a housing-and-retail development in Menorca, Binibeca Vell, built in 1964 to resemble a traditional Greek village, went viral on Instagram and TikTok in the 2020s, resulting in an influx of tour buses and other tourists anxious to replicate the photos they'd seen on social media.

In Scotland, the North Coast 500, marketed by Scotland as a scenic route, has experienced an influx of Instagram tourism. The Isle of Skye's Fairy Pools have experienced an influx after photos went viral on Instagram. Images of the Jacobite steam train, which was used as the Hogwarts Express in the Harry Potter films, have become a subject for Instagram tourism.

Norway's Trolltunga, which had 800 visitors in 2010, experienced 80,000 in 2016, a change which was attributed to social media exposure.

== Consequences ==
The phenomenon and resulting overtourism has been implicated in issues of conservation of natural areas, waste management, crowd control and public safety, and housing shortages for local residents.

In a study done in 2024 analyzing "tourism-related content" across several Gulf-region destinations found a direct correlation between the consumption of content and actual tourist inflows. Social-media exposure is not just a reflection of tourist interest but has also driven the flow of tourism. These studies suggest that destinations that become popular on social media may experience an increase in visitation even if the destination was previously obscure. Over time this can contribute to overcrowding, overtourism, and strain on infrastructure.

Critics of Instagram tourism point to increases in numbers of visitors putting pressure on infrastructure but not increasing revenues that stay in the local area, due to the brief time spent by most engaging in the behavior. Some commenters have characterized travel posts on Instagram as a democratization of travel that provides information to less-affluent travelers. Lauren A. Siegel, lecturer in Tourism and Events at the University of Greenwich in London, has argued that influencers can minimize the downsides of posting about travel to social media by providing balance. Kim Jong-Yoon, CEO of South Korean travel and leisure platform Yanolja, argued that it was creating more equitable and inclusive travel.

Additionally, public safety issues have also emerged from Instagram tourism. This has caused places to erect barriers to prevent tourists falling over canyon edges or otherwise endangering themselves while snapping a selfie to post to social media. Instagram tourism has been implicated in some municipalities in increased rescue callouts.

== Management ==
Some municipalities and locations have restricted the number of Instagram tourism and other very short-stay visitors contributing to overtourism pressures, such as day trippers and cruise ship passengers, using various strategies.

Some municipalities have closed roads to non-residents to prevent heavy traffic caused by those visiting to take specific selfies. In 2020, Halstatt, Austria, implemented a system to limit entry of buses. Barcelona in 2024 announced an increased tax on cruise passengers disembarking for fewer than 12 hours.

In 2023 Venice imposed a €5 tax on those who weren't staying overnight, who make up approximately two-thirds of the city's 30 million visitors per year. After a South Korean Netflix series, Crash Landing on You, was filmed there, Iseltwald on Lake Brienz began charging an entrance fee of CHF5 for the town pier, the preferred selfie-spot for tourists.

In the Balearics, authorities had created a program rewarding social influencers for posting about less-popular destinations, but the strategy backfired and was ended after those areas, some of which are remote and environmentally sensitive, also became overwhelmed with "visitors who take selfies, post them on social media and leave", according to The Guardian.

In Japan, a barrier was erected to prevent photos being taken by tourists of Mt. Fuji behind a convenience store after such images went viral on social media; it was later removed.
