= Horseshoe Bend (Arizona) =

Landform in the Colorado River, Coconino County, Arizona

Coordinates: 36°52′46″N 111°30′50″W

Horseshoe Bend

Horseshoe Bend is a horseshoe-shaped incised meander of the Colorado River located near the town of Page, Arizona, United States.

Horseshoe Bend is located 5 miles (8 km) downstream from the Glen Canyon Dam and Lake Powell within Glen Canyon National Recreation Area, about 4 miles (6 km) southwest of Page.

It is accessible via hiking a 1.5-mile (2.4 km) round trip from a parking area just off U.S. Route 89 within southwestern Page. The land south of the Bend's parking area, trail, and overlook are on the Navajo Nation territory.

Horseshoe Bend can be viewed from the steep cliff above.

The overlook is 4,200 feet (1,300 m) above sea level, and the Colorado River is at 3,200 feet (1,000 m) above sea level, making it a 1,000-foot (300 m) drop.

== Geology ==
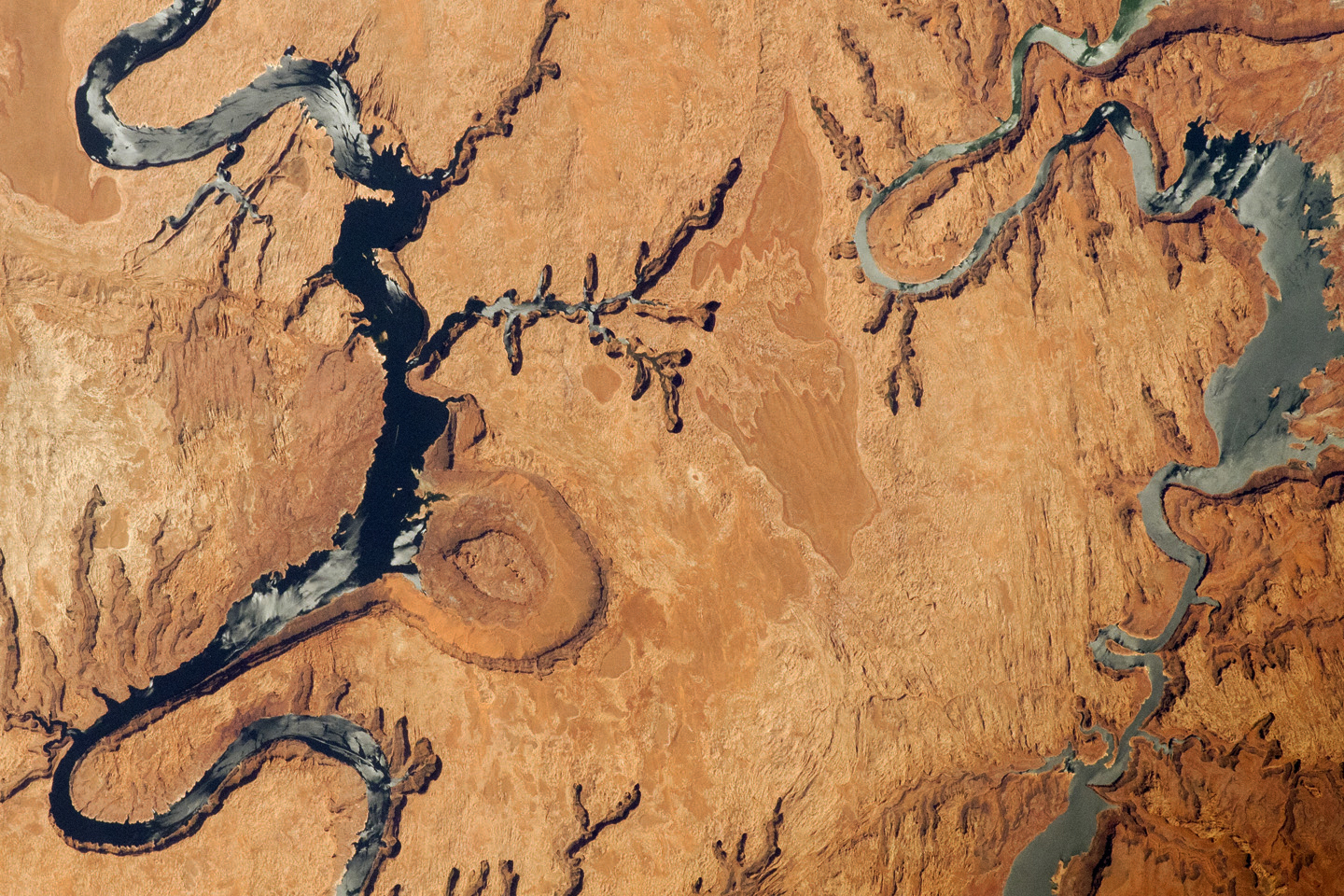
The Rincon on Lake Powell in southern Utah. It is an incised cutoff (abandoned) meander.

Horseshoe Bend is a superb example of an entrenched meander. Six million years ago, the region around Horseshoe Bend was much closer to sea level, and the Colorado River was a meandering river with a nearly level floodplain. Between six and five million years ago, the region began to be uplifted. This trapped the Colorado River in its bed, and the river rapidly cut downwards to produce Horseshoe Bend as we see it today.

The cause of this uplift is still a matter of research. One hypothesis is that it was a result of delamination, where the lowest layer of the North American tectonic plate below the Colorado Plateau detached and sank into the underlying mantle. This would have allowed hotter rock from the asthenosphere, the part of the Earth's mantle that underlies its tectonic plates, to rise and lift the overlying crust. Another possibility is that the uplift was the result of heating at the base of the crust. This transformed the lowest crustal rock from eclogite, a relatively dense rock (3.6 g/cm^{3}) to garnet granulite, which is significantly less dense (2.9 g/cm^{3}). This would have produced the buoyant forces needed to uplift the region.

Whatever the cause of the uplift, it resulted in the erosion of up to a mile of overlying sediments from the eastern Grand Canyon. This exposed the Navajo Sandstone, the surface rock found throughout the Horseshoe Bend area, which also forms the entire depth of the canyon walls of the Grand Canyon at Horseshoe Bend. This sandstone is notable for its crossbedding and iron concretions.

It is likely that the Colorado River will eventually cut through the neck of the bend, producing a natural bridge like those found at Natural Bridges National Monument in Utah. The river will then abandon Horseshoe Bend, leaving a cutoff meander resembling The Rincon further north along the Colorado River in Utah.

== Tourism ==
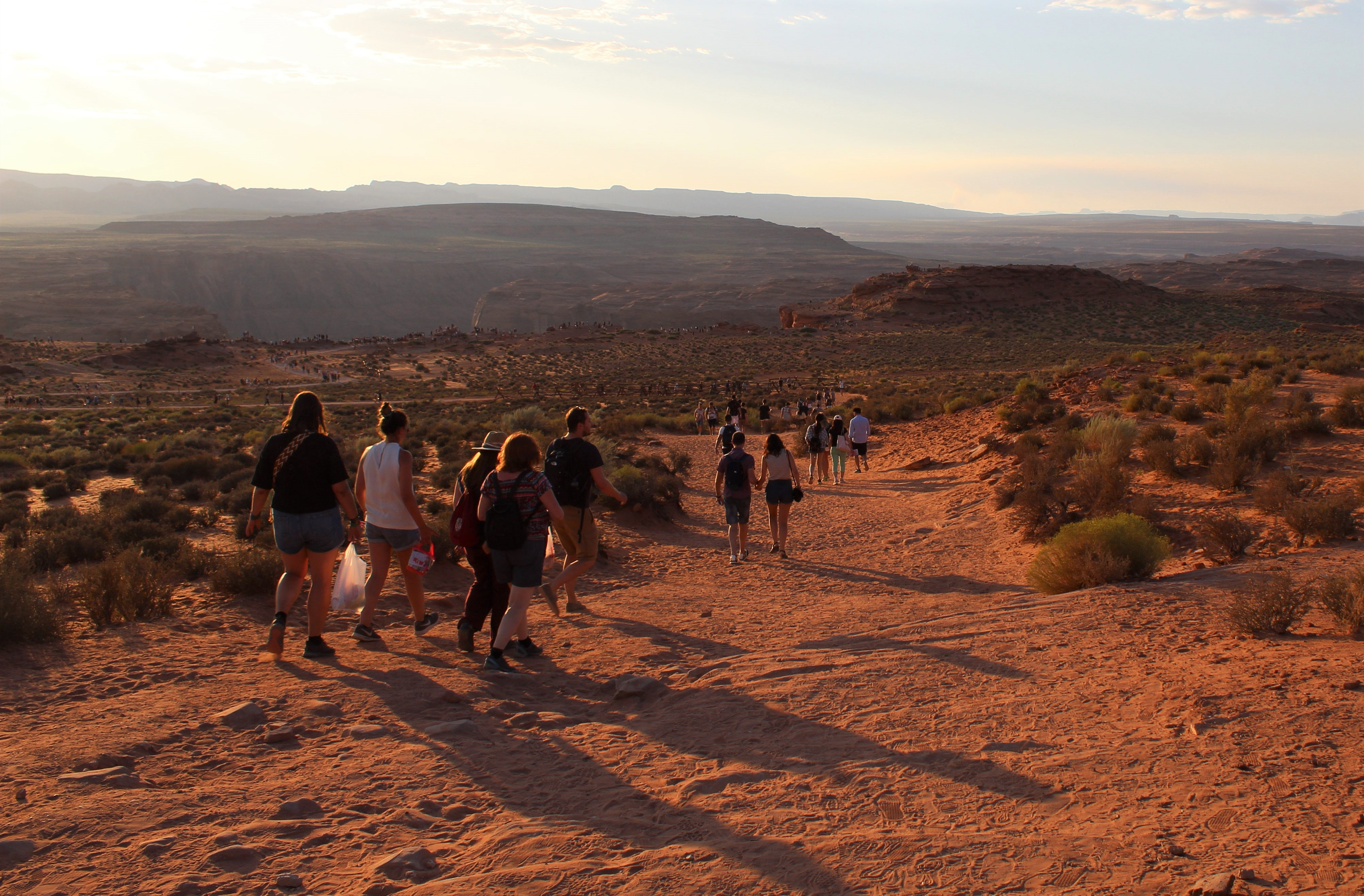
Tourists hiking Horseshoe Bend, 2019

For a long time Horseshoe Bend was mostly popular with nearby residents, but the yearly visitor count sharply increased with exposure through social media. Currently the lookout is a major tourist destination with more than 2 million visitors a year.

The city government of Page in 2019 started charging a fee to use the U.S. Route 89 parking area and preventing drivers from parking on the highway nearby. As of 2025, the fee is $10 per passenger car. Page brought in $20.3 million from the fees between 2019 and May 2024, some of which helped fund city services.

== See also ==
- Instagram tourism
