= Tourismphobia =

Negative attitudes towards tourists

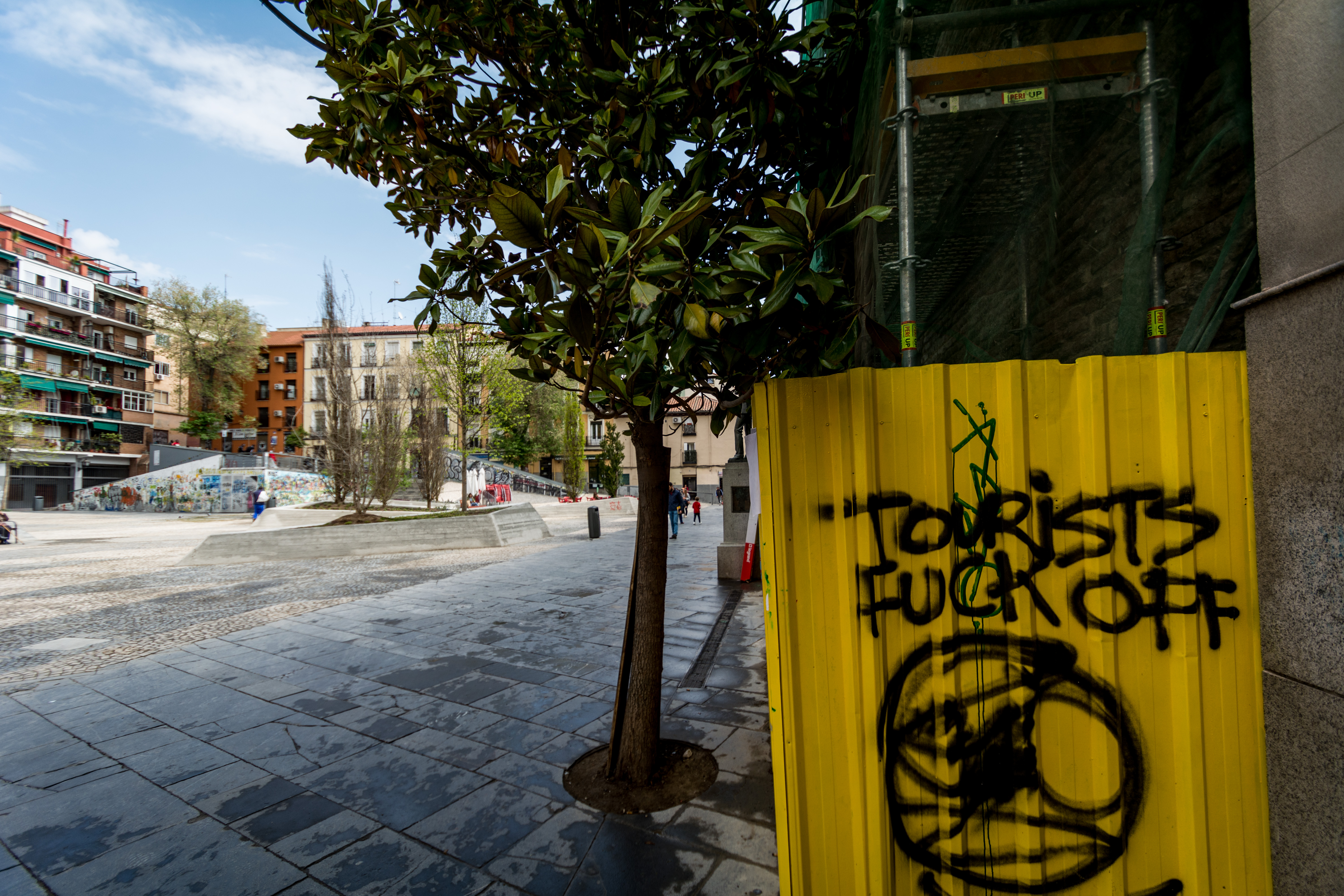
Graffiti "Tourists fuck off" in Madrid.

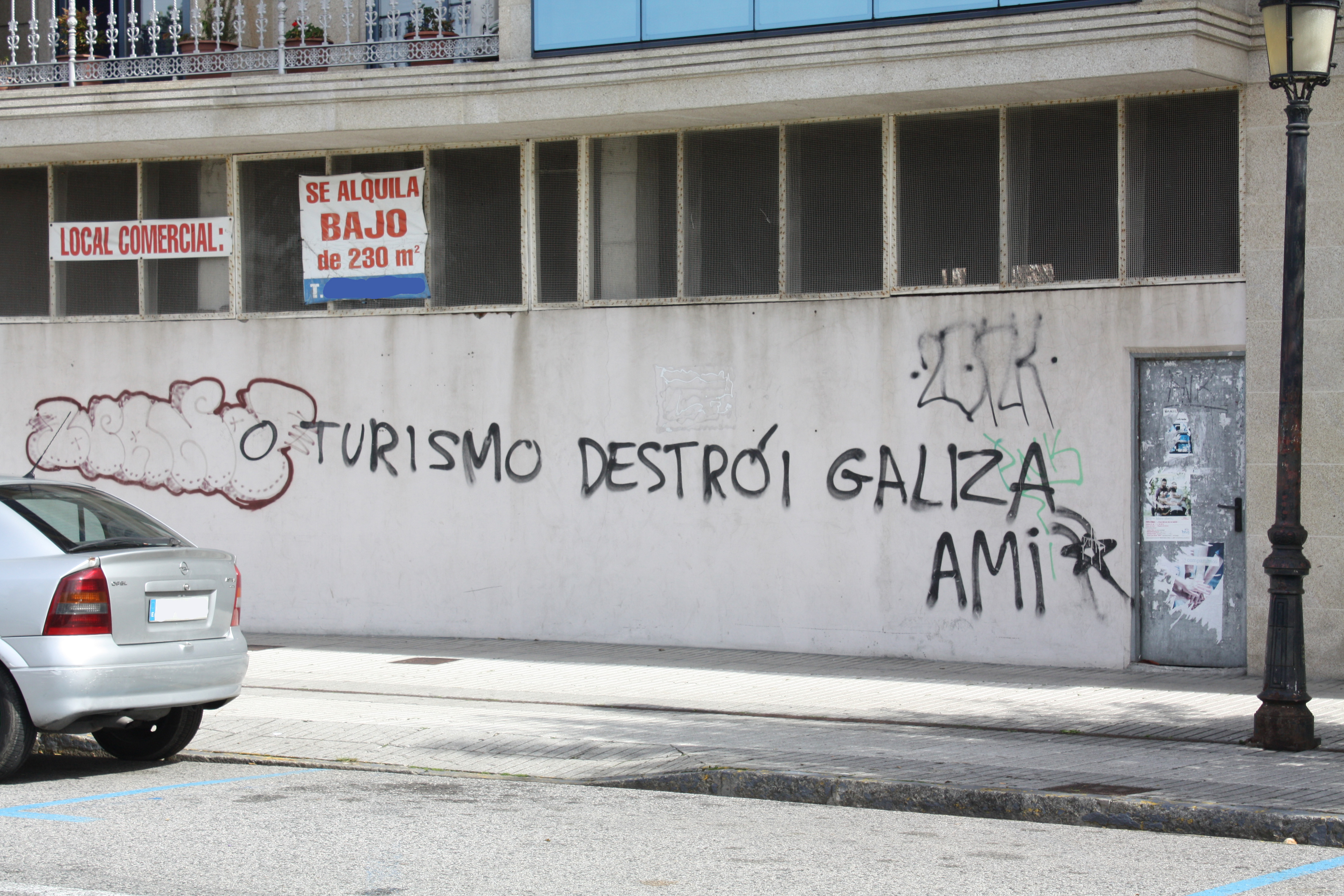
Graffiti against overtourism in Vilagarcía de Arousa.

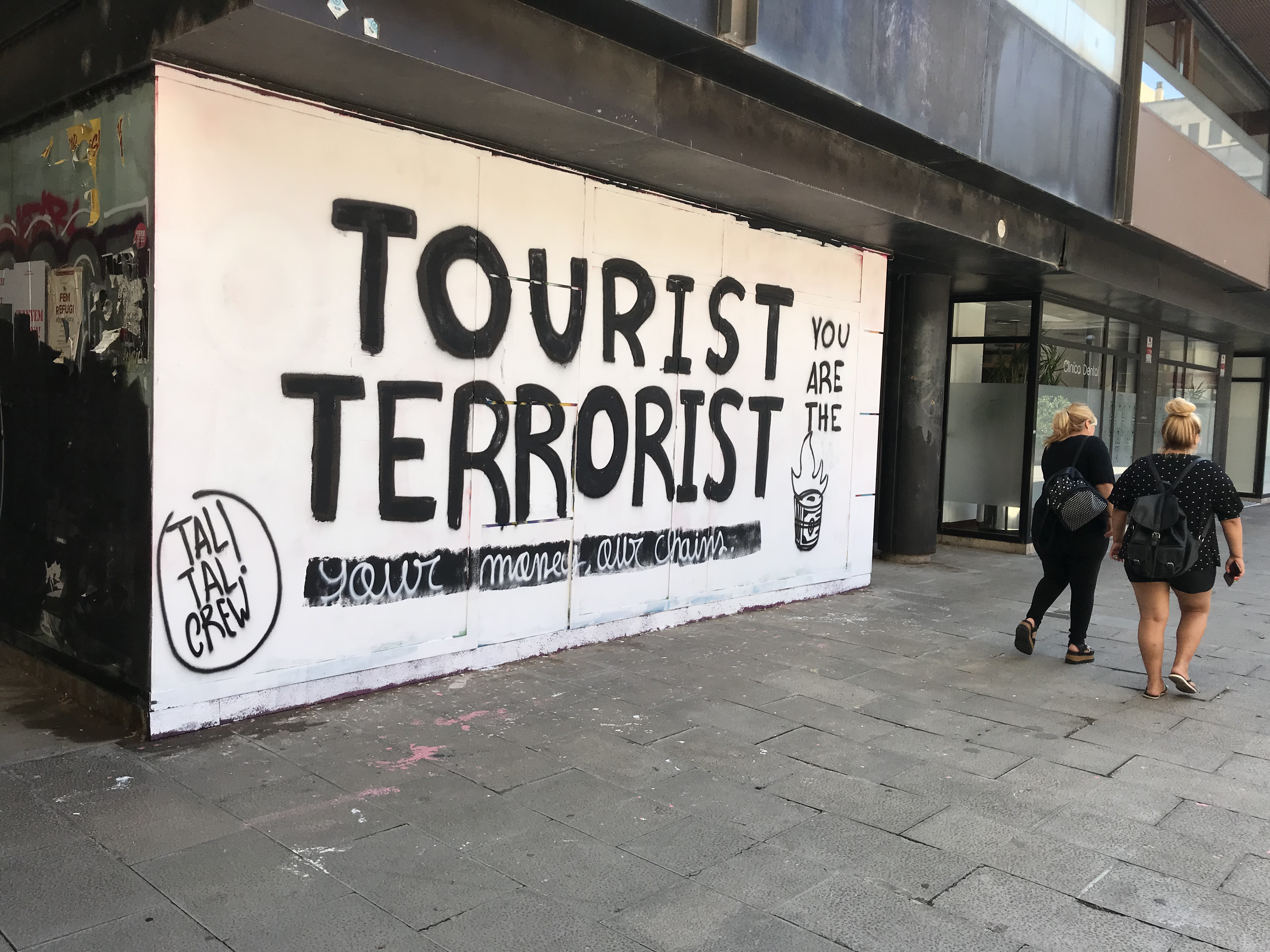
"Tourist terrorist" (Girona)

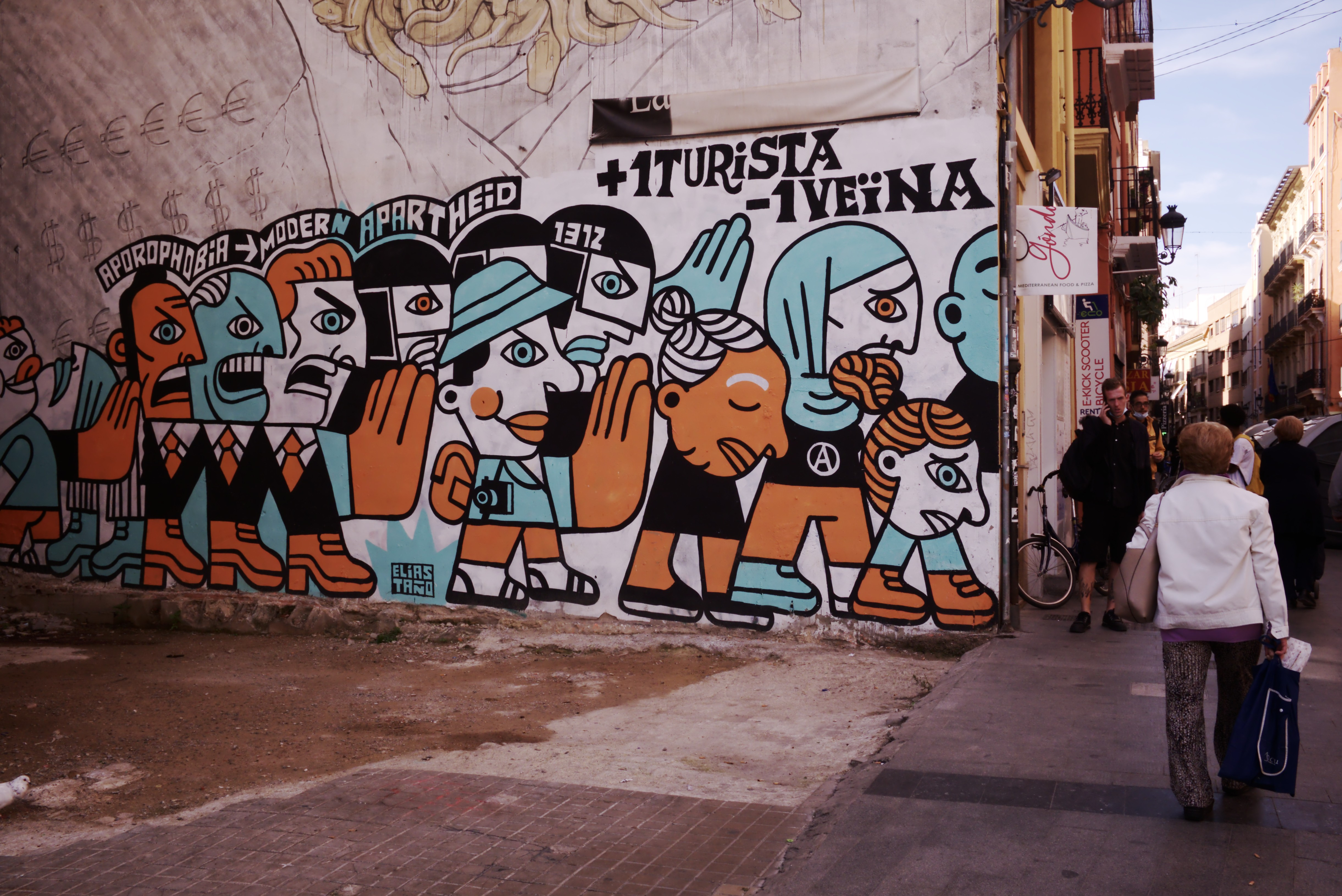
+1 Turista −1Veïna ("one more tourist, one neighbour less") (Valencia)

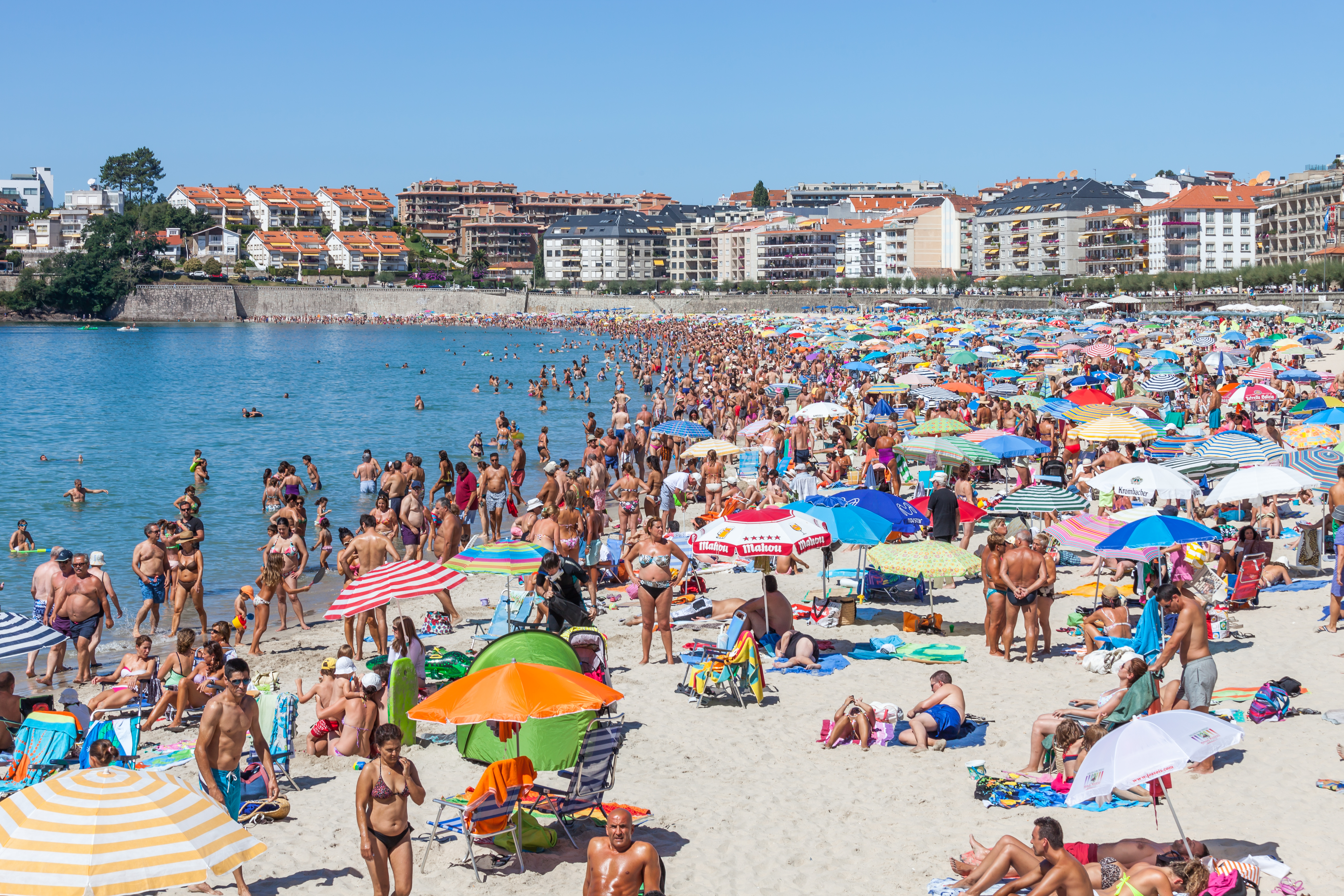
Praia de Silgar, crowded, in Sanxenxo

Anti-tourist sentiment are negative attitudes toward tourism and can include discrimination. Tourismphobia can be used in the context of the rejection of overtourism, a tourism model characterised by massification and its negative consequences for the local population and workers.

== Characterization ==
Since the 2010s a criticism against tourist saturation led – in many cases – by activism and political parties has begun to spread in several tourist destinations, especially urban ones. Starting in the second half of the 20th century, the dissemination of tourism in neighborhoods and urban centers has generated a social claim based on the idea that overtourism is the direct cause of negative impacts such as unstable, seasonal and low salaries, degradation of the natural areas, difficulties to access rental properties with increasing prices, environmental pollution, traffic problems and noise.

The neologism has also been used in the media to tag the acts of vandalism, protests and incidents with tourists during protests in South Europe against overtourism.

== Chronology of the neologism ==
The conflict represented by the neologism has been studied in academia since the '70s such as by George Doxey, who covered it from the root of the tourist destination. The problem has not stopped being studied since then and the term overtourism became popular in academia after the launch of some journals' special issues in 2017. In parallel the protests in several cities of Southern Europe introduced the neologism tourismphobia as well in the academia and the political argumentation of several parties in Europe.

== See also ==
- Gentrification
- Instagram tourism
- Overtourism
- Short-term rental
