= Overcrowding =

Excess of people in a space

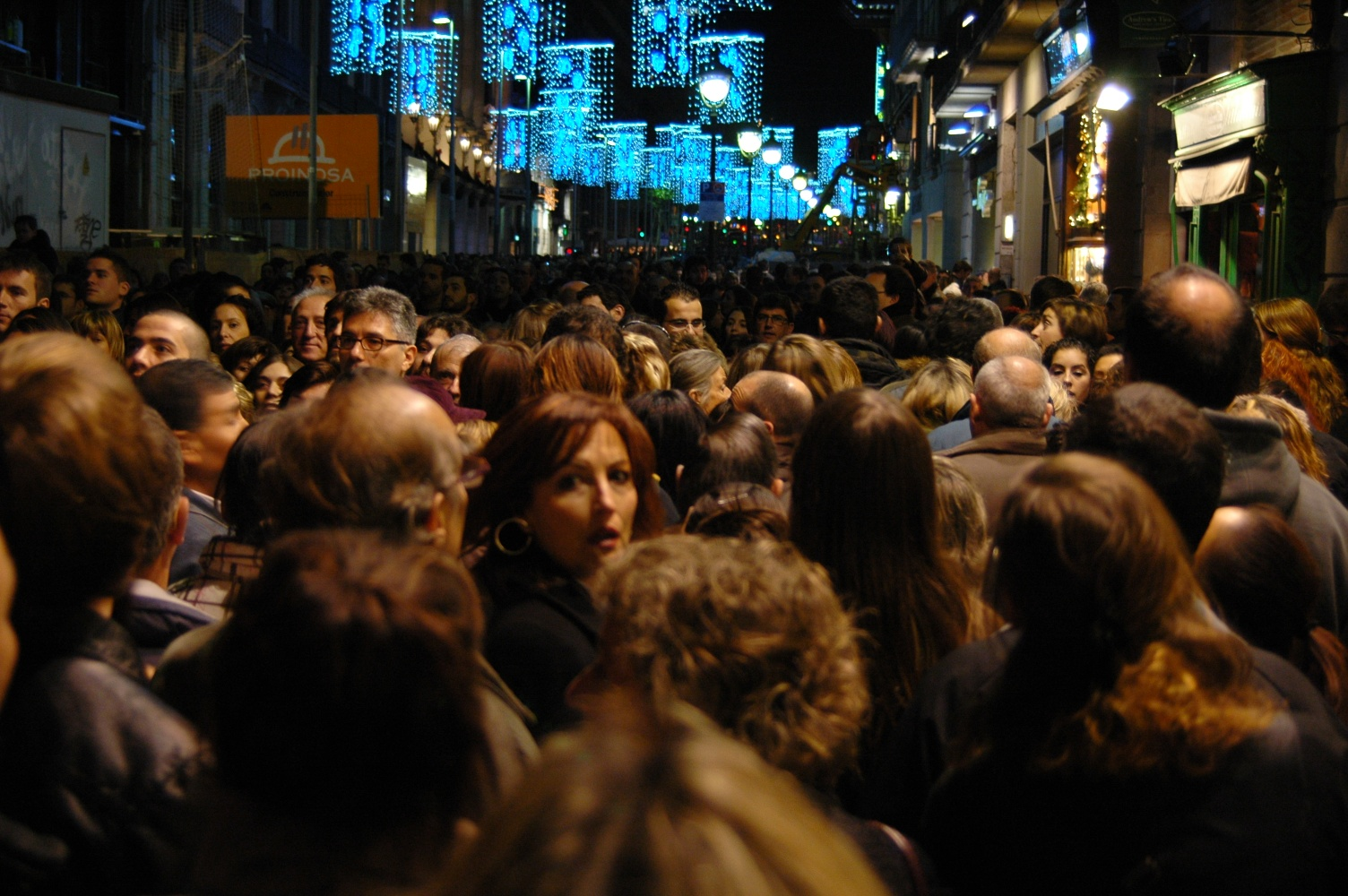
An overcrowded street in Catalonia, Spain during Christmas season

Overcrowding or crowding is the condition where more people are located within a given space than is considered tolerable from a safety and health perspective. Safety and health perspectives depend on current environments and on local cultural norms. Overcrowding may arise temporarily or regularly, in the home, in public spaces or on public transport. Overcrowding in the home can cause particular concern, since the home is an individual's place of shelter.

Effects on quality of life due to crowding may include increased physical contact, lack of sleep, lack of privacy and poor hygiene practices. While population density offers an objective measure of the number of people living per unit area, overcrowding refers to people's psychological response to density. However, definitions of crowding used in statistical reporting and for administrative purposes depend on density measures and do not usually incorporate people's perceptions of crowding.

== Measures of overcrowding ==
=== United States ===
The American Housing Survey is conducted by the United States Department of Housing and Urban Development (HUD) every two years. A 2007 literature review conducted for HUD's Office of Policy Development and Research found that the most commonly used measures of overcrowding are persons-per-room or persons-per-bedroom. The United States uses persons per room, and considers a household crowded if there is more than one person per room, and severely crowded if more than 1.5 persons share a room.

=== World Health Organization ===
The World Health Organization is concerned with overcrowding of sleeping accommodation primarily as a risk for the spread of tuberculosis and has attempted to develop measurement indicators.

=== United Kingdom ===
The Housing Act 1985 states:

"The room standard is contravened when the number of persons sleeping in a dwelling and the number of rooms available as sleeping accommodation is such that two persons of opposite sex who are not living together as husband and wife must sleep in the same room. For this purpose, children under the age of ten shall be left out of account, and a room is available as sleeping accommodation if it is of a type normally used in the locality either as a bedroom or as a living room."

The Housing Act describes how many persons are permitted per room, as well as amount of floor space per room as outlined in the table below. Children under 1 year are not counted, and children between 1 and 10 years are counted as half a unit.

Area (in sq. ft)	No. of persons
110 or more	2 persons
90 to 110	1.5 persons
70 to 90	1 person
50 to 70	0.5 persons

=== European Union ===
Eurostat uses a stricter definition of overcrowding, known as 'the Bedroom Standard'. An overcrowded household is defined as one which has fewer rooms than the sum of:

- one room for the household;
- one room per couple in the household;
- one room for each single person aged 18 or more;
- one room per pair of single people of the same gender between 12 and 17 years of age;
- one room for each single person between 12 and 17 years of age and not included in the previous category;
- one room per pair of children under 12 years of age.

For example, a household of a single person living alone is considered overcrowded unless he or she has a living room which is separate from the bedroom (points 1 and 3 apply). However, while the Bedroom Standard is generally advocated by policy advocates, statutory space and occupancy standards are usually either less generous, partial (for instance they apply to social housing only) or non-existent.

According to Eurostat, in 2011, 17.1% of EU population lived in overcrowded households by the above definition, with the number varying strongly between countries: the overcrowding rate stood at 43.1% in 12 newest member states compared to only 10.1% in 15 oldest members. Within the EU post-communist states, the extent to which the commodification of housing has improved occupancy standards appeared to be modest. For instance, during 2005-2010 the percentage of overcrowded population in Romania and Latvia remained the highest in the EU (55%). Conversely, the Czech Republic showed the best performance in 2010, with overcrowding falling from 33% to 22% over the period, becoming lower than in Italy and Greece. In the remaining EU post-communist states, overcrowding fell moderately over the period, accounting for 35-49% in 2010. Lifecycle has remained a powerful determinant of overcrowding. Eastern Europeans aged under 18 are on average 2.5 times more likely to experience overcrowding than those aged over 65. Affordability problems of young adults, who had to delay home leaving, contributed to unrelenting overcrowding, but so did the legacy of a housing stock composed of many small dwellings. In the EU post-communist states, between 51 and 87% of dwellings had no more than three rooms. A 2026 study using data from the German Socio-Economic Panel found that the share of people living in overcrowded housing in Germany increased from around 8% in 2012 to 11% in 2022, according to the Eurostat definition. The study also reported that 19% of respondents considered their homes too small, while 39% lived in objectively underoccupied housing, highlighting the unequal distribution of housing space.

=== Sweden ===
Swedish statistics and politics have used three different definitions over the years:

Definition	Defined when	Exempt from calculation	Inhabitants per bedroom	Percentage of households that are overcrowded				
Definition	Defined when	Exempt from calculation	Inhabitants per bedroom	1945	1960	1975	1985	2002
Norm 1	1940s	Kitchen, bathroom	2	30%	13%	1%	-	-
Norm 2	mid 1960s	Kitchen, bathroom, one living room	2	-	43%	7%	4%	-
Norm 3	1974	Kitchen, bathroom, one living room	1 individual or a couple	-	-	-	15%	15%

The most dramatic change took place according to "norm 2" between 1960 and 1975 because of the Million Programme. Of the households that are regarded as overcrowded according to "norm 3", two thirds are single persons living in 1-room apartments without a separate living room.

== Risks due to overcrowding ==
- Spread of infectious diseases
- Psychological distress
- Violence
- Break down of relationships
- Poor sleep
- Slow development

== Solutions ==
In response to overcrowding on public transport, cities and transport operators are turning to technology for solutions. For example, the London Assembly is exploring modern carriage designs and apps that guide commuters to less crowded carriages. Technologies like Wi-Fi tracking and mobile signal analysis are being trialed to monitor passenger flows and optimize train capacity. These initiatives aim to improve commuter experience by reducing overcrowding and enhancing the efficiency of public transport systems.

Cities like New York and Boston are leveraging open data and cross-agency collaboration to tackle overcrowding. By gathering detailed data on housing, occupancy, and zoning violations, cities can preemptively address potential overcrowding and efficiently allocate resources for inspections and enforcement. This approach also includes innovative measures like monitoring illegal conversions and using predictive analytics to identify at-risk properties.

== See also ==
- Housing
- Human overpopulation
- Overtourism
- Prison overcrowding
- Social Determinants of Health
