= Overtourism =

Excessive number of tourists

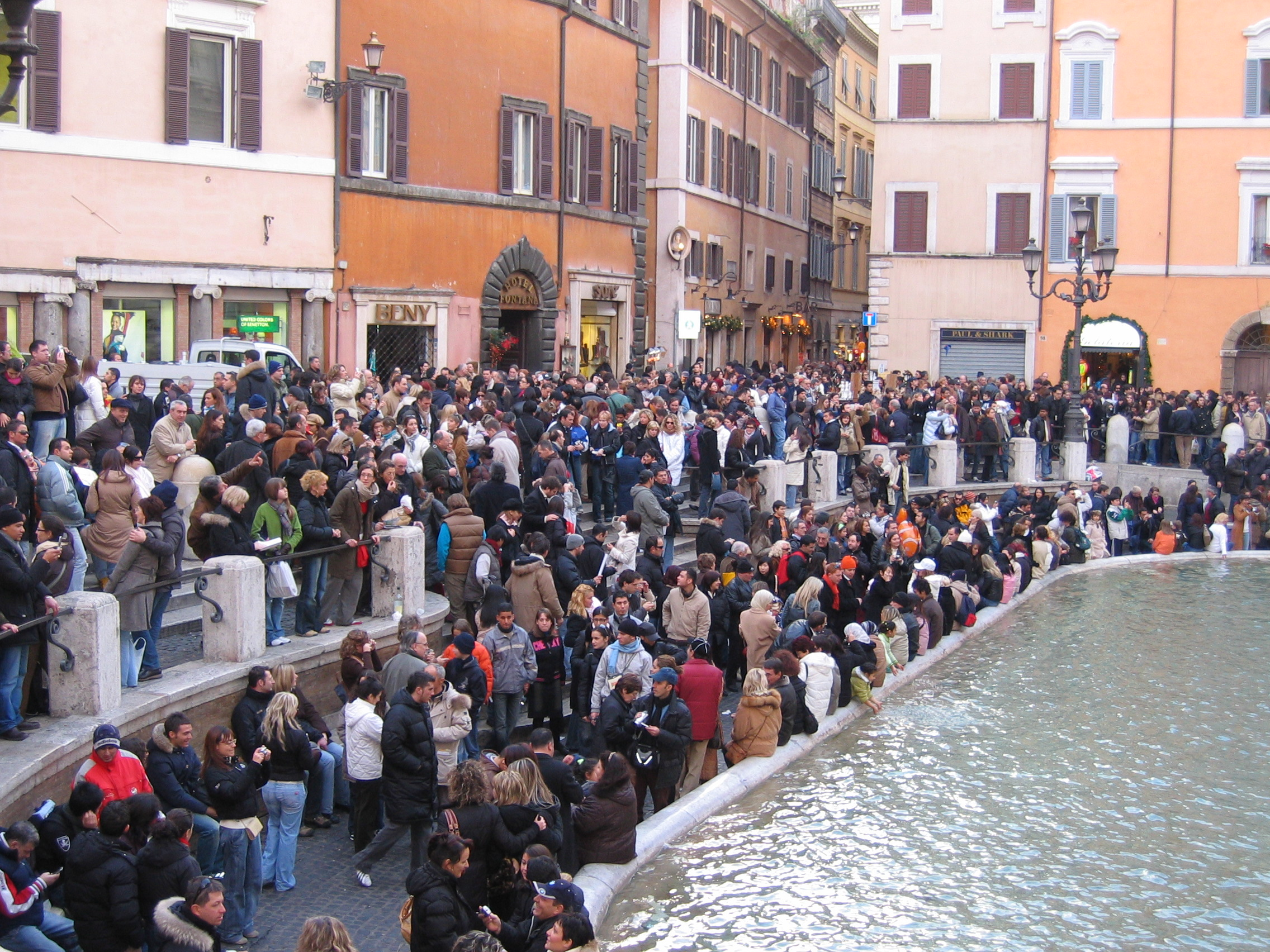
Crowds at the Trevi Fountain in Rome

Overtourism is congestion or overcrowding from an excess of tourists, resulting in conflicts with locals. The World Tourism Organization defines overtourism as "the impact of tourism on a destination, or parts thereof, that excessively influences perceived quality of life of citizens and/or quality of visitor experiences in a negative way". This definition shows how overtourism can be observed both among locals, who view tourism as a disruptive factor that increasingly burdens daily life, as well as visitors, who may regard high numbers of tourists as a nuisance. Instagram tourism has been implicated as a cause.

The term was only used infrequently before 2017, but is now the most commonly used expression to describe the negative impacts ascribed to tourism.

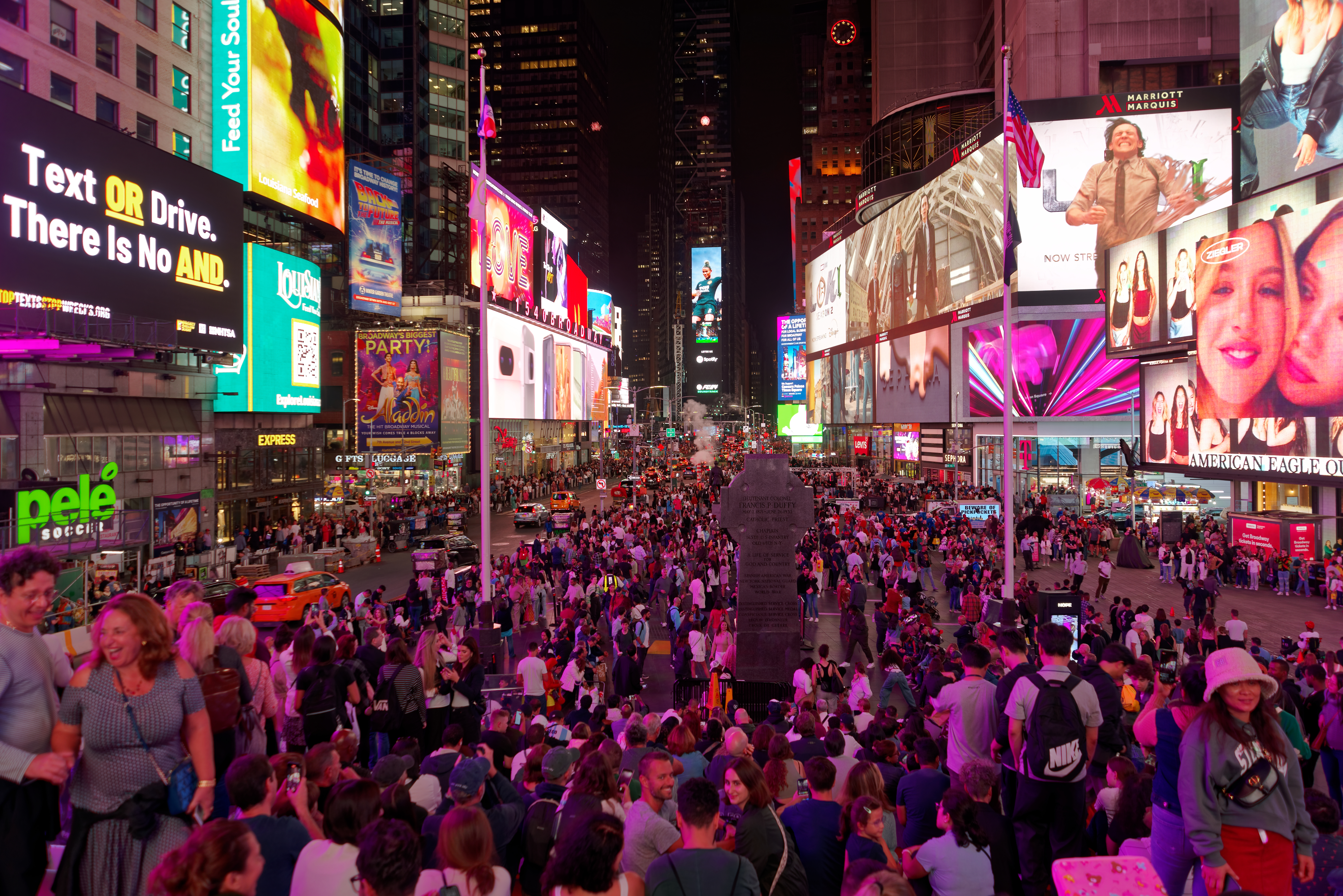
New York City has received more than 50 million tourists in 2022. Times Square (pictured) receives around 300,000 visitors each day.

== Characterisation ==
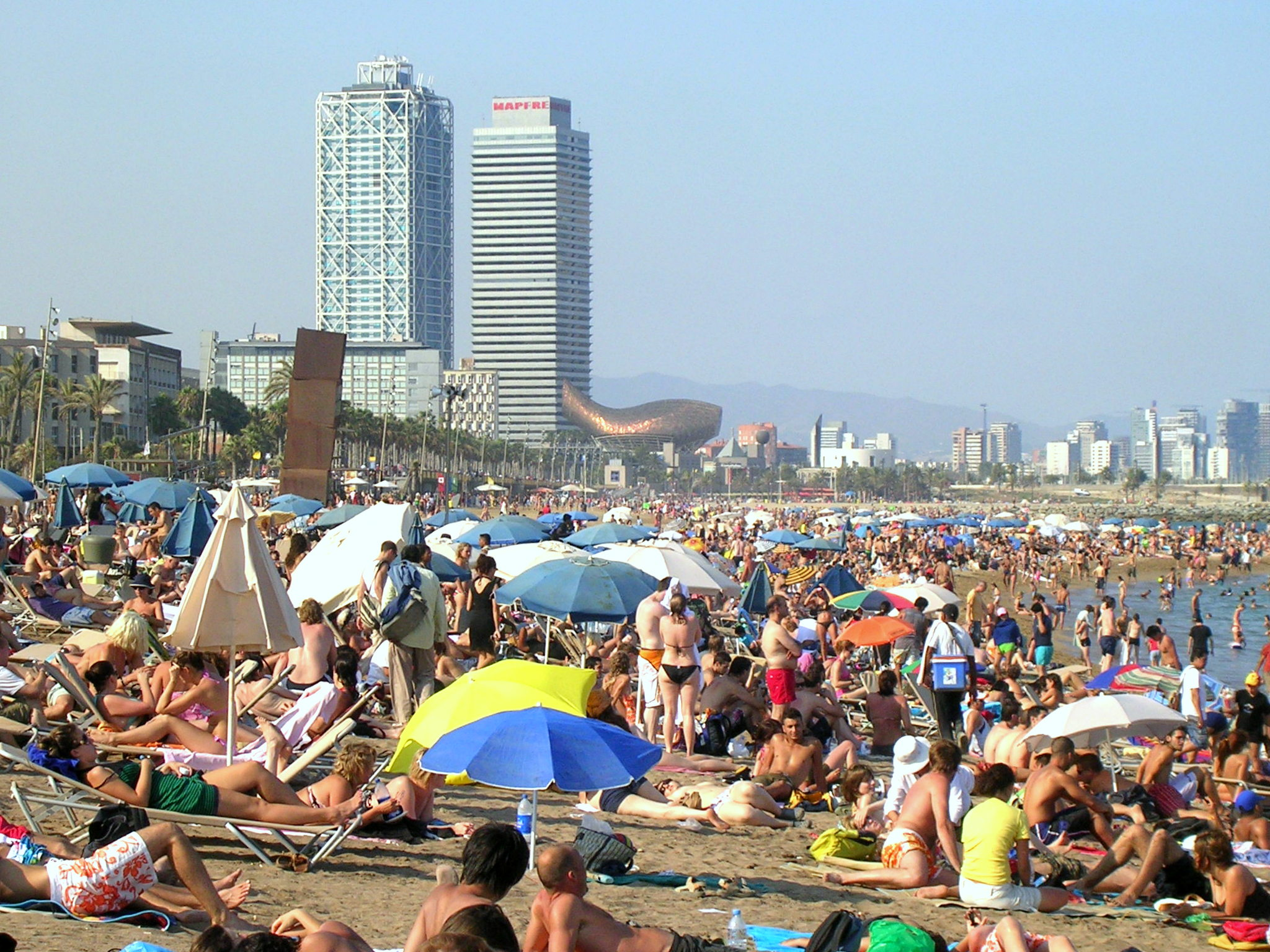
Tourists on the Mediterranean Coast of Barcelona, 2007

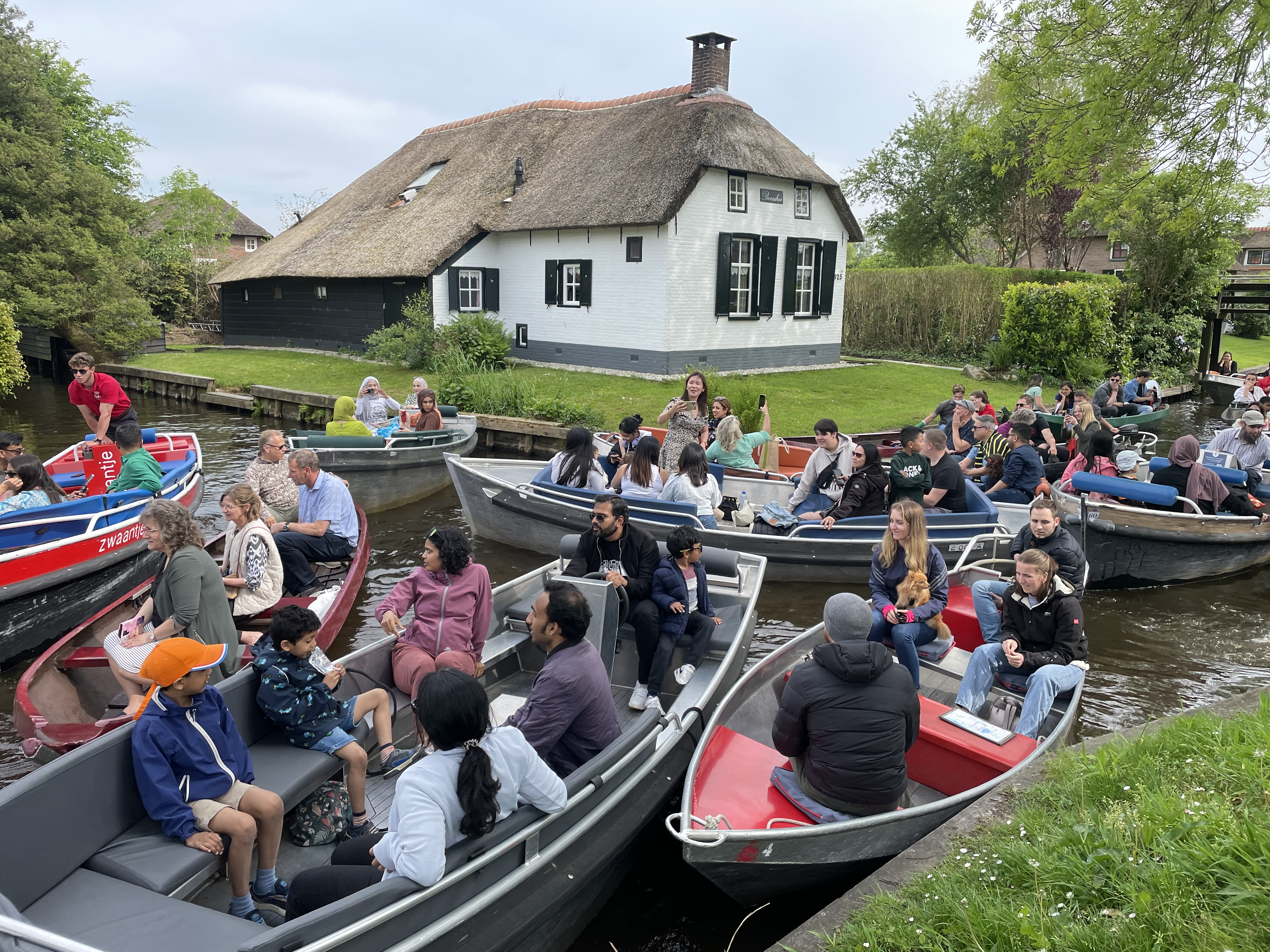
Giethoorn is a picturesque village in the Netherlands of some 2900 inhabitants. It receives about 1.5 million tourists per year.

The growth of tourism can lead to conflicts between residents, commuters, day-visitors and overnight tourists. Although much attention is currently given to overtourism in cities, it can also be observed in rural destinations, or on islands. The World Tourism Organization (UNWTO) found that a perception of overcrowding can prompt local residents to protest against tourism. The excessive growth of visitors can lead to negative effects for local residents, especially during temporary or seasonal tourism peaks. Therefore, the carrying capacity of a tourist destination is also measured in terms of social carrying capacity, and the behaviour of the tourists.

Overtourism is sometimes incorrectly equated with mass tourism. Mass tourism entails large groups of tourists coming to the same destination. While this can lead to overtourism, there are many destinations that host millions of visitors, yet are not seen as suffering from overtourism (e.g., London). Tourists usually use infrastructure and services designed for residents. If the carrying capacity is exceeded of the infrastructure and services tourists need to use as well, the service provision focuses on the priorities of the tourists. Residents may be forced to use the service provision intended for tourists.

== Opposition to tourism ==
Resistance to overtourism is not a recent phenomenon. In mid-July 1926, individuals and small groups of Frenchmen in Paris began attacking American tourists in the Left Bank and Montmartre protesting against the American invasion with its loud, arrogant, and ignorant behaviour, aggravated by widespread aversion in France to the repayment of war debts and the Mellon-Berenger Agreement. In the words of historian Harvey Levenstein: "What would later be called 'the Ugly American' phenomenon had reared its head". U.S. President Calvin Coolidge felt obliged to rebuke the "bumptious" behaviour of tourists, while balancing his message with a warning that badly treated Americans would stay home.

Crowds began to harass and purposely block the passage of "Paris by Night" tours in large charabancs—high open buses seating about thirty people that had popularized tours of Paris "Night Life." On one occasion a policeman was even forced to fire shots in the air when he came to the tourists' aid. As the French franc plummeted in value against the U.S. dollar, some tourists started sticking them on the walls of railway compartments and onto their luggage, as they did with hotel and steamship labels. Some even threw money on the streets and laughed at the French that went after them. The American habit of asking, "How much is that in real money?" was seen as especially offensive. The obeisance to the dollar and going along with outrageous American demands angered much of the French press.

In the 1990s local residents in Spain, Greece, Malta, and France started to oppose mass tourism, which was perceived as Fordist. In rural areas of Latin America, environmental concerns were the key driver for rising discontent and social campaigns against tourist real estate developments. In Mexico and Central America vehement protests were triggered by tourist real estate speculation alongside the exploitation of workers, and even dispossession or displacement of local residents.

In 2017 Europe saw a wave of residents' protests in cities, including Barcelona, Venice, and Palma de Mallorca. The problems arising from overtourism began to be discussed in academic publications, but no commonly accepted definition of the phenomenon has been agreed on.

Throughout 2025, a second wave of protests is growing in Southern Europe, including Portugal. In December 2025, the Spanish government, in efforts to curve overtourism, fined Airbnb $75 million for advertising unlicensed rentals to tourists.

Opposition to tourism has been described as discriminatory.

== Causes ==
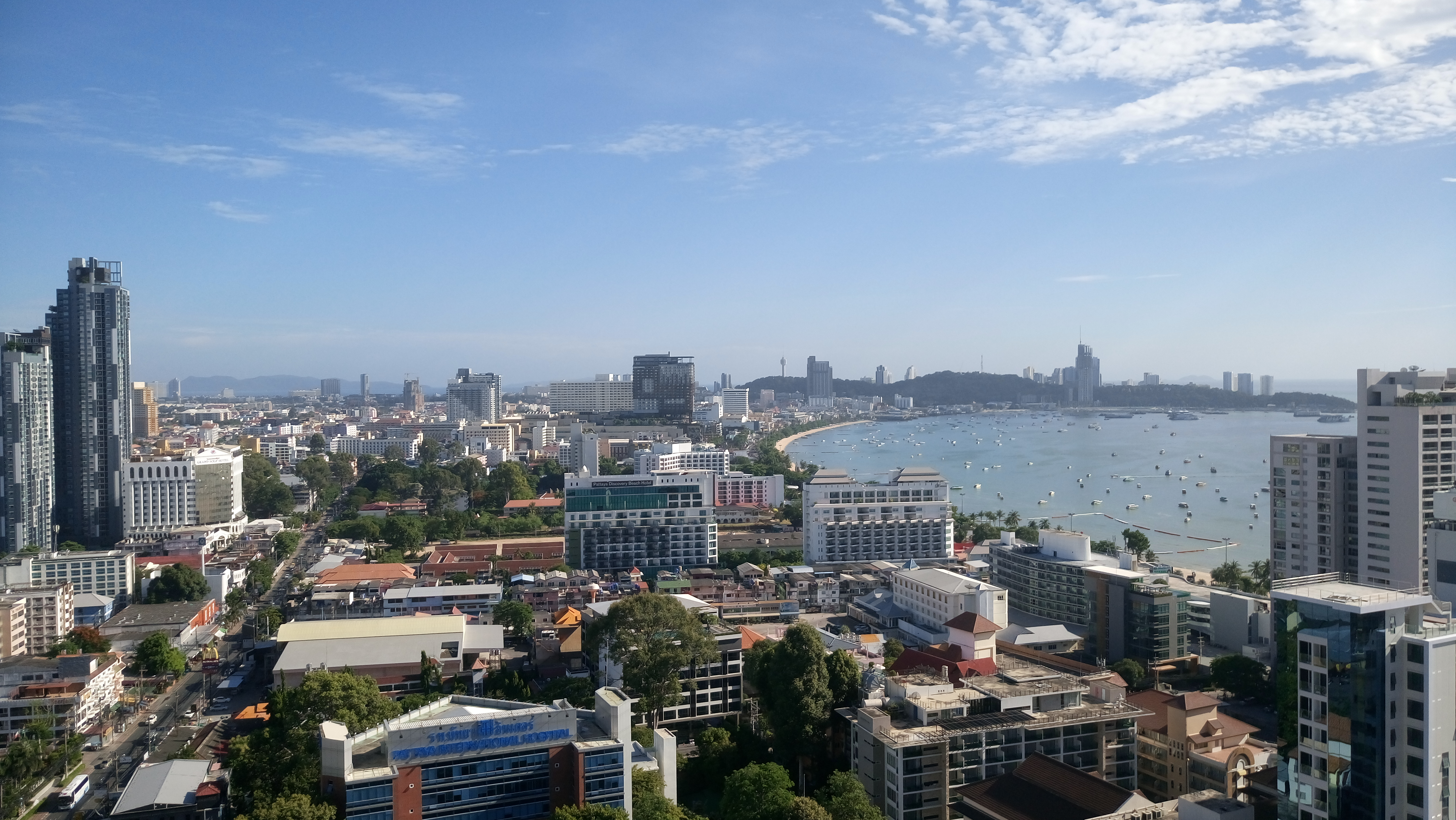
Pattaya welcomed 9.44 million visitors in 2019.

Overtourism is observed mostly, but not exclusively, when the number of visitors to a destination, or parts thereof, grows rapidly in a short space of time. Also, it is most common in areas where visitors and residents share a physical space. In recent years, developments within tourism and outside of tourism have increased contact between residents and visitors and made the impacts of tourism more noticeable. In addition to the overall growth of tourist numbers, problems associated with overtourism have been exacerbated by the following developments:

There are currently more tourists than ever before in world history. According to UNWTO there were 25 million international arrivals in 1950, which increased to 1.3 billion by 2017. In 1963 Walter Christaller published on the negative effects of tourism. In 2016 tourists numbered over a billion, a 50-fold increase compared to 1950. Media coverage on overtourism has focused on Europe, which bears the brunt of tourism arrivals with 50 percent, and South East Asia, which sustains 25 percent of tourism arrivals. The international tourism sector is expected to grow 3.3% annually, until 2030 a year at which point an expected 1.8 billion tourists will cross borders.

The rise of low-cost carriers (LCCs), the availability of inexpensive intercity bus service, and the popularity of cruise ship travel are assumed to have contributed to complaints about overtourism. In academic literature government policy, the ambitions of service providers in tourist destinations, as well as the influence of social media are considered enablers of overtourism.

Airbnb and similar online accommodation services have been accused of triggering an increase in tourists due to lower prices, compared to hotels or other establishments. Airbnb claims it attempts to route guests to less crowded destinations. Airbnb is also claimed to have led to fewer affordable housing opportunities for residents, increased rent prices, and loss of social community within neighborhoods.

The experience economy and changing lifestyle patterns have been blamed for the increased use of leisure facilities, contributed to a monoculture of hospitality facilities.

Instagram tourism has been implicated as a cause of overtourism.

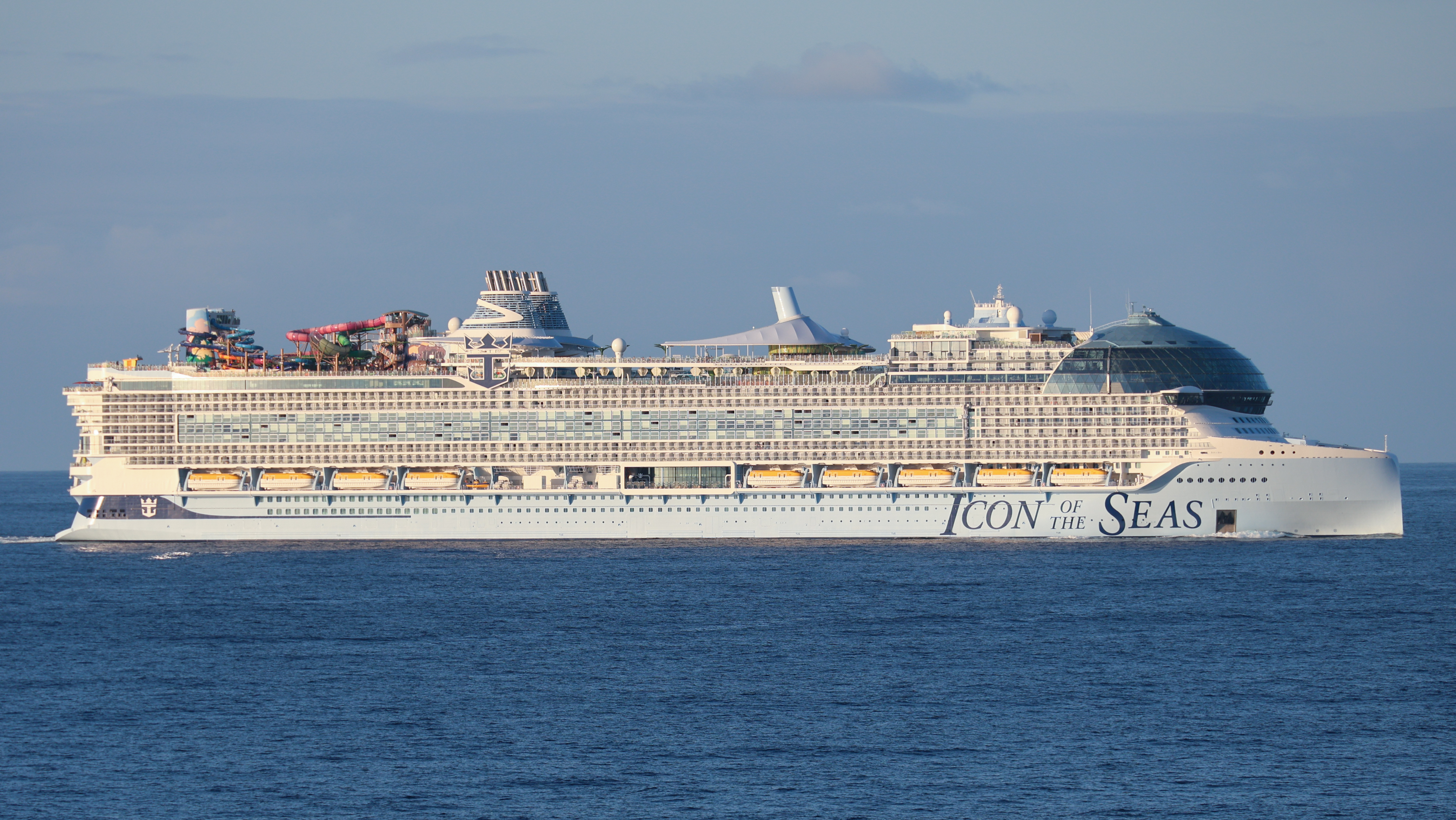
Icon of the Seas, one of the largest cruise ships in service with a maximum capacity of 7,600 passengers

Cruise ship tourism has been identified as a severe driver of over tourism in port cities. Cruise passengers are typically day visitors who disembark for only a few hours, contribution to sudden, intense spikes in footfall without generating proportional economic benefit to local economies, as they sleep, eat, and spend the majority of their money aboard the ship. Cities like Dubrovnik, Croatia and Palma de Mallorca in Spain have introduced caps on the number of cruise ships are permitted to dock on any given day in response to resident protests. In Venice, Italy there has been a large cruise ship ban from its historic lagoon in 2021 following decades of debate over the ships' wake damage to the city's foundations, water and air pollution, and their role in making the city feel inaccessible to residents. In addition to social impacts, cruise ships are among the most carbon intensive modes of travel, consuming vast quantities of fossil fuel and emitting CO₂ alongside other pollutants.

== Responses to overtourism ==
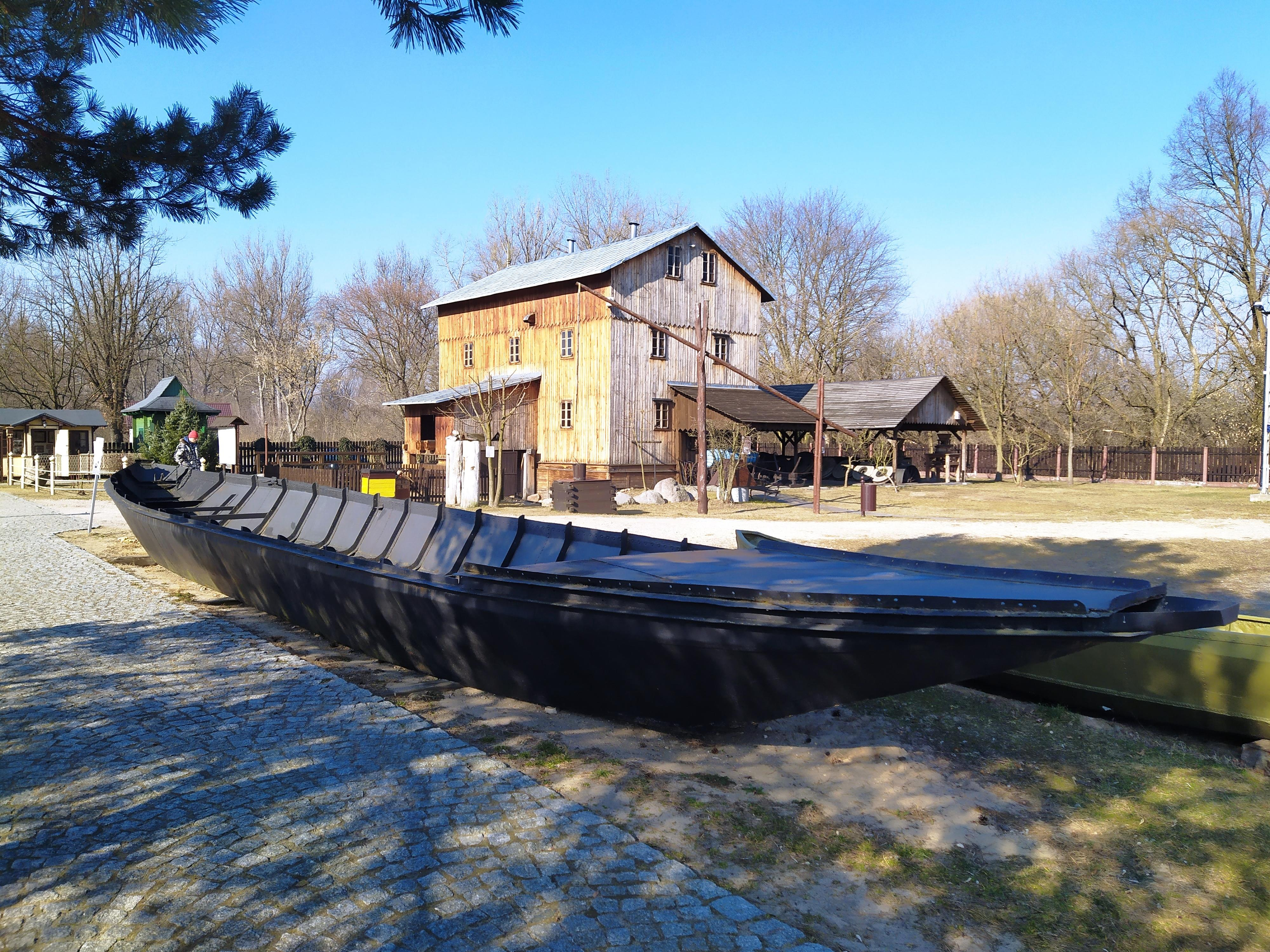
Pilica River Skansen, a new tourist attraction in the central part of Poland

In September 2018, the World Tourism Organization (UNWTO) published a report on overtourism and how to deal with it. The report highlights the importance of looking at tourism in a local context and details 11 strategies to deal with overtourism:

1. Increase the physical dispersion of crowds among different attractions within a city/destination;
2. Increase the temporal dispersion of tourists (e.g., by encouraging off-season visits);
3. Promote new and special-interest itineraries and attractions;
4. Make effective use of regulations on tourism;
5. Tailor activities to specific segments of the tourism market;
6. Ensure that the communities and residents benefit from tourism;
7. Create experiences beneficial to both tourists and residents;
8. Expand infrastructure;
9. Involve local residents in tourism policymaking;
10. Communicate with tourists about the potential impacts of tourism on communities;
11. Use data to monitor and respond to problems related to overtourism.

The consultancy firm McKinsey & Company suggests that to prevent overtourism one must focus on four priorities:

- Build a comprehensive fact base and update it regularly.
- Establish a sustainable-growth strategy through rigorous, long-term planning.
- Involve all sections of society—commercial, public, and social.
- Find new sources of funding.

In addition, systematic public-relations and communication is essential. Goals, measures, successes and failures of local tourism management must be made transparent to the inhabitants so that all relevant institutions become involved.

=== Tourism degrowth ===
Tourism degrowth has emerged as a framework for addressing overtourism that goes beyond conventional demand-management tools. Distinct from a simple economic recessing in tourism, degrowth refers to a deliberate and planned reduction in tourism activity, prioritizing ecological sustainability and community over well being over visitor volume. Büscher and Fletcher from the 2021 Hall, Lundmark, & Zhang article were one of the first to systematically propose the degrowth as a sustainable tourism pathway. Critics of approaches like tourist taxes and entrance fees argue that such measures primarily generate revenue rather than meaningfully reduce visitor numbers or carbon emissions. Proponents of degrowth instead advocate for measures such as banning new hotel construction, limiting cruise ship arrivals, and capping short-term rental leases. Some destinations have acted on these principles: Amsterdam has moved to close its cruise terminal, and Dubrovnik has imposed caps on the number of daily cruise ship passengers. Resistance to degrowth policies often stems from the economic dependence of local industries and governments on tourism revenue, illustrating the tension between short-term economic priorities and long-term sustainability.

== Post-pandemic tourism rebound and heightened overtourism ==
The COVID-19 pandemic brought international tourism almost to a halt in 2020 and 2021, prompting some scholars and policymakers to call for a structural "reset" of the global tourism toward greater sustainability. However, when travel restrictions were less strict and more manageable in 2022 and 2023, tourism demand surged rapidly, quickly returning to pre-pandemic levels in almost all destinations. According to the United Nations World Tourism Organization, international tourist arrivals in 2023 reached approximately 88% of 2019 levels, with full recovery expected by 2024. This post-pandemic rebound intensified overtourism pressures in established hotspots and introduced new ones. Japan, for example, experienced severe crowding at sites such as Mount Fuji and the Gion district in Kyoto, prompting local authorities to introduce visitor barriers and access restrictions. Rather than prompting a structural shift in tourism governance, the pandemic proved to be only a temporary interruption of pre-existing growth trends.

Overtourism is closely linked to the concept of the "Tragedy of the commons," a theory originating with ecologist Garrett Hardin in 1968. This ultimately describes how shared resources are prone to degradation when individuals act in their own self interest without coordinated management. Tourist destinations, specifically their natural and cultural heritage assets, function as common pool resources. They all share broadly and can be depleted through overuse. Scholars note that both overtourism and the tragedy of the commons have evolved from the rigid frameworks into more contextual and normative ones, acknowledging that the appropriate platform for tourism is socially constructed and varied significantly across destination types. Individuals rarely perceive their own contribution to add onto the problem of overcrowding, effective governance of overtourism requires collective or regulatory intervention rather than reliance on individual behavioral chance alone.

== Examples ==
As of 2017, several media outlets published lists of destinations that are not recommended because of an excessive number of tourists.

=== Antarctica ===
According to CNN, environmentalists are concerned about the effect of tourism on Antarctica, which steadily increased during the 2010s. The total number of visitors to Antarctica, as registered by the International Association of Antarctica Tour Operators (IAATO) in the 2023-24 summer season was 122,072. Cruise-only vessels (i.e. vessels not putting travelers on shore) accounted for 35% of the visitors.

=== Aruba ===
In Aruba, the chemical oxybenzone in sunscreen is harming coral reefs and marine life. In 2019 a proposed law called "Choose Zero" was introduced, which includes a ban on importing, selling, or distributing single-use plastic products and products containing oxybenzone.

=== Austria ===
Hallstatt in 2020 had 780 citizens and more than 10,000 visitors a day, primarily arriving via tour bus, stopping briefly for photographs, and moving on quickly. Citizens complained about tourists entering homes and private gardens to take photos, or applauding funerals at the churchyard. In 2020, the town implemented a system to limit entry of buses.

=== Bhutan ===
In 2018, Bhutan instituted a US$200 to US$250 charge per day for tourists because of overtourism concerns.

=== Canada ===
Banff National Park located in Alberta known for Lake Louise and Moraine Lake. In 2024, 4 million tourists came to Banff annually with July being recorded as one of the busiest months. Overcrowding is becoming a serious issue. In the past visitors could drive to Moraine Lake but cars are no longer permitted. Tourists visiting Moraine Lake are required to book a shuttle. Municipalities and tourism organizations have been trying to promote visiting in the winter by promoting winter tourism and adding winter events to reduce the issue of seasonality where Banff would see a booming revenue during summer but a slowdown during winter.

The province of Prince Edward Island is visited by millions of tourists every summer, putting strains on the local infrastructure and housing supply. Local advocacy groups have called on the Provincial Government to put a cap on the volume of tourists to prevent overtourism.

=== China ===
The Great Wall of China has been damaged by overtourism.

=== Croatia ===
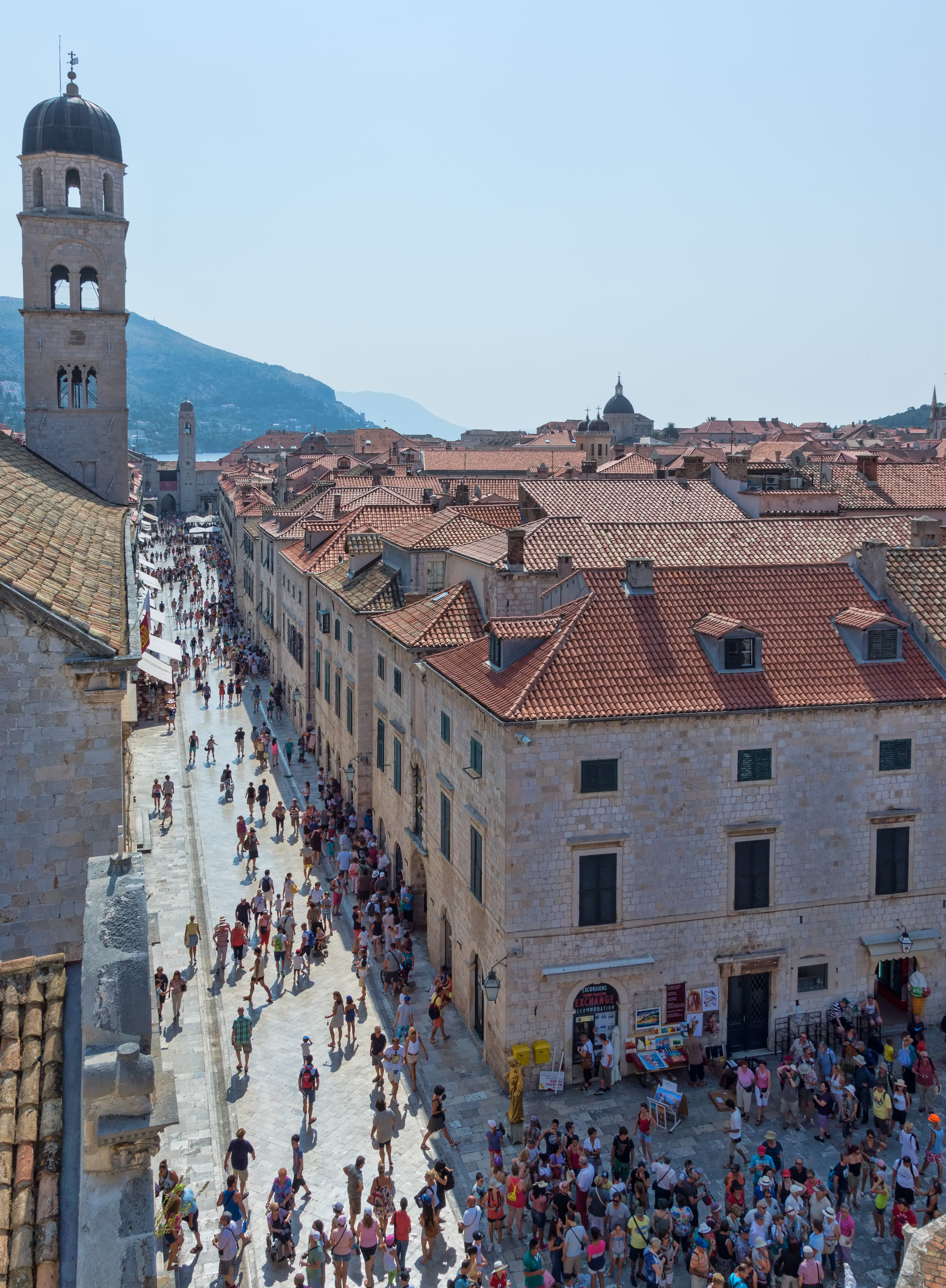
Overtourism during summer in Dubrovnik, 2013

Dubrovnik became so overtouristed by 2017 that UNESCO considered removing it from the World Heritage Site list. The city capped the number of visitors allowed to climb its ramparts and as of 2017 was planning to limit the number of cruise ships that could dock. In 2020 they were considering limiting the number of new restaurants allowed to open.

A 2026 study using retailer-level price microdata from Croatia found that grocery prices in tourism-intensive coastal municipalities rose more rapidly during the peak tourist season, particularly in July and August.

=== Ecuador ===
The Galápagos Islands were included on Fodor's 2017 list of places not to go because of environmental damage caused by overtourism. As of 2017, visitors are required to hire a guide.

=== Finland ===
In Rovaniemi, Lapland, locals have complained about overtourism during the winter season, which is especially visible in connection with the Santa Claus Village.

=== France ===
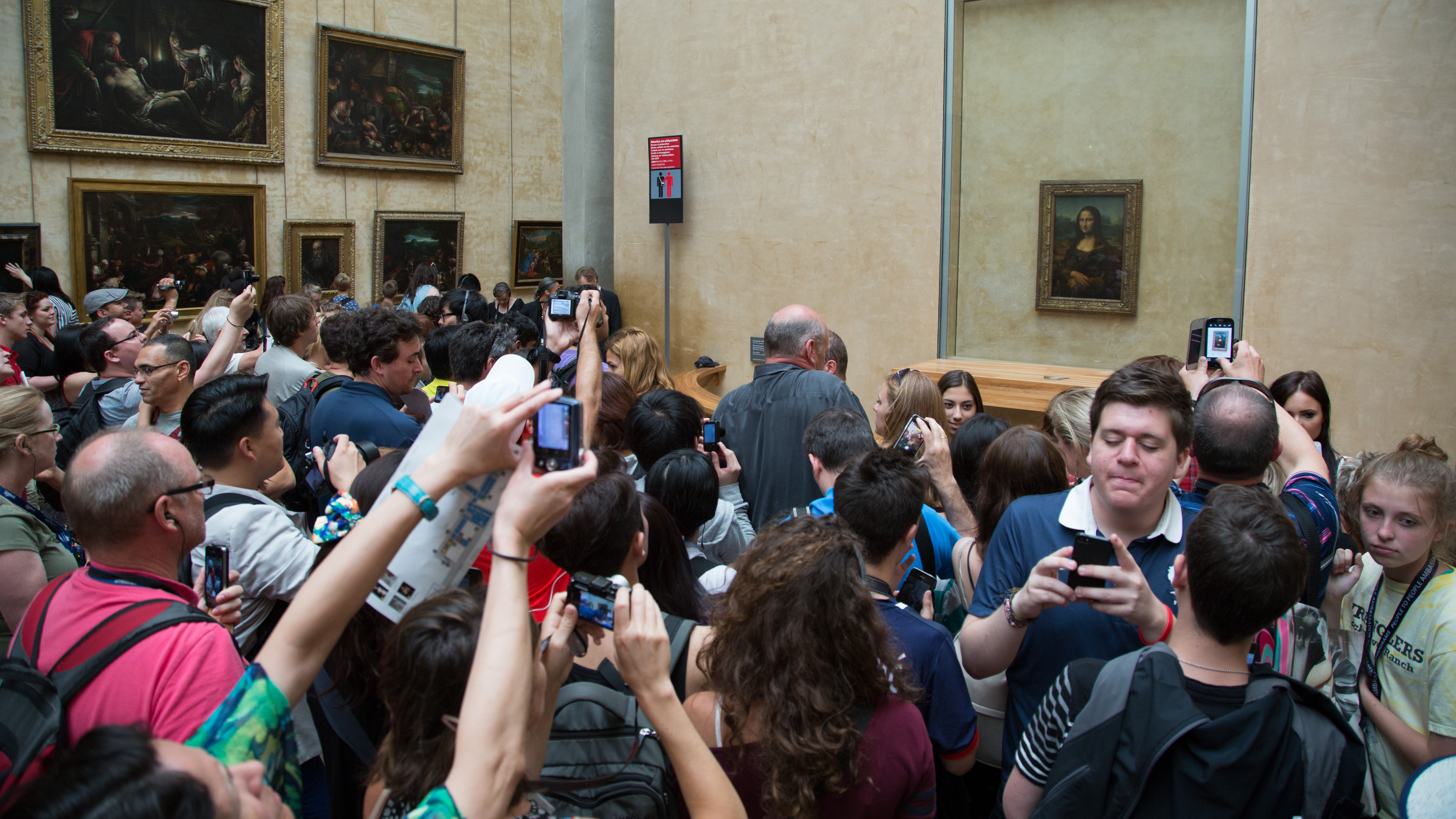
Overtourism at the Louvre

In Paris, workers at the Louvre went on strike over what they said were dangerously overcrowded conditions.

=== Greece ===
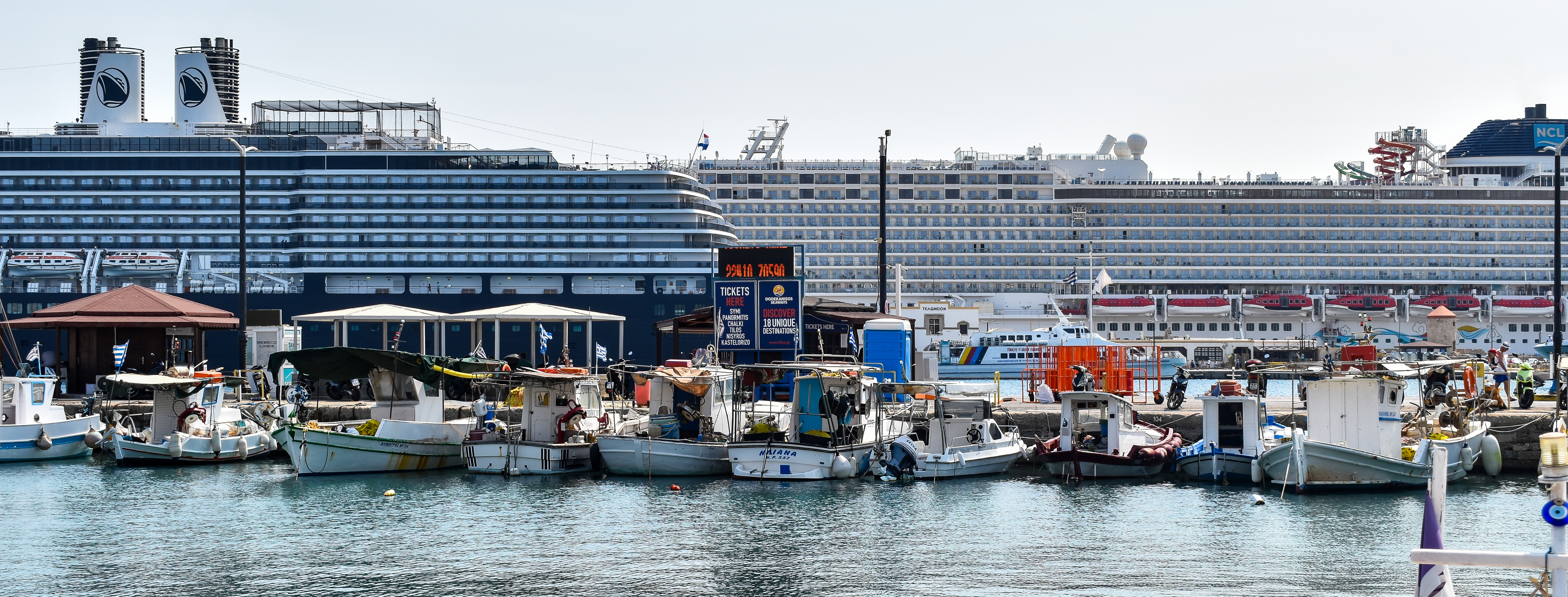
Overtourism in the Port of Rhodes, Greece

In Santorini, cruise ship visitors have been capped at 8,000 per day due to overtourism after years in which the island of 15,000 residents was receiving up to 18,000 tourists per day.

=== Germany ===
The Zugspitze has been plagued by overtourism, especially because of day trippers arriving via gondola.

The European Alps experience a raise in accidents and deaths, since many tourists underestimate the difficulty of mountain routes, and go mountaineering with insufficient equipment or low fitness and stamina.

=== Hawaiʻi ===
In Hawaii the degradation of corals has been shown to worsen in areas with higher concentration of tourists.

=== Iceland ===
The Fjaðrárgljúfur area was closed after the music video for Justin Bieber's I'll Show You made it so popular the government needed to improve infrastructure.

Tourism in Iceland is predominantly nature based and therefore comes with the challenge protecting the environment with the increase in tourism to the country. Overuse of natural areas can cause long-lasting and possibly permanent damage to vegetation, soils, and the landscape. With the rapid growth, there is also a lack of infrastructure on the island to fully support the increase in tourism, alongside an already present population. This causes further issues such as traffic on roads that can be difficult to travel.

=== India ===
In 2019 the Taj Mahal started fining visitors who stay more than three hours. CNN in 2017 called the crowds "relentless".

=== Indonesia ===
Bali was, in 2020, planning a US$10 tourist tax.

=== Iran ===
Abyaneh's overtourism is often reported on.

=== Iraqi Kurdistan ===
Iraqi Kurdistan is the most toured part of Iraq, especially during Newroz. Tourists come from all around Iraq and the world for Newroz. In Duhok, 3 people were arrested for planning to burn 200 tires for the Newroz fire in 2022. In Akre, a city famous for its Newroz celebrations, some locals decided to burn wooden torches instead of tires.

=== Italy ===
Comparison of the number of tourist arrivals and the number of residents in Venice between 2008 and 2023.

Venice has faced declining population because of overtourism. In 2019 Forbes called it one of the "most notably overtouristed destinations" in the world. CNN in 2017 called the crowds "overbearing." The city in 2018 tested the use of turnstiles in St. Mark's Square to control the number of visitors. In 2020 the daily tourist tax was US$11.

Capri in 2018 tested ways to limit day tourism. Cinque Terre had 2.5 million visitors in 2015, and local authorities sought to limit visitors to 1.5 million in 2016, but a backlash resulted in this being walked back. CNN in 2017 said that day tourists from cruise ships, who tour for a few hours and don't spend money, are blamed for environmental damage. Officials in Rome made it illegal to sit on the Spanish Steps, with fines of up to US$448, due to damage caused by tourists.

In the 2010s Pragser Wildsee became an area of overtourism, receiving up to 17,000 visitors on a single summer day in 2020; as of 2023, there were vehicle access restrictions.

The government of Florence is currently seeking to ban new short-term rental properties in the city's historic center, which is a UNESCO World Heritage Site. The city's administration argues that the increased availability of short-term rentals through platforms such as Airbnb, which cater to tourists, have made housing inaccessible for local residents.

Lake Como, long a popular destination, has also experienced significant overtourism pressures, amplified by celebrity appeal and social media visibility. The area recorded 4.8 million overnight stays in 2023, leading to severe strain on public transport and road infrastructure, particularly during peak season. This influx occurs within a hydrogeologically fragile environment. Similar to Florence, the boom in short-term rentals has inflated property prices, making housing less accessible for locals and contributing to depopulation in some lakeside villages. Management strategies being implemented or considered include visitor caps at popular attractions like Villa del Balbianello and discussions around introducing tourist taxes or entry fees.

=== Japan ===
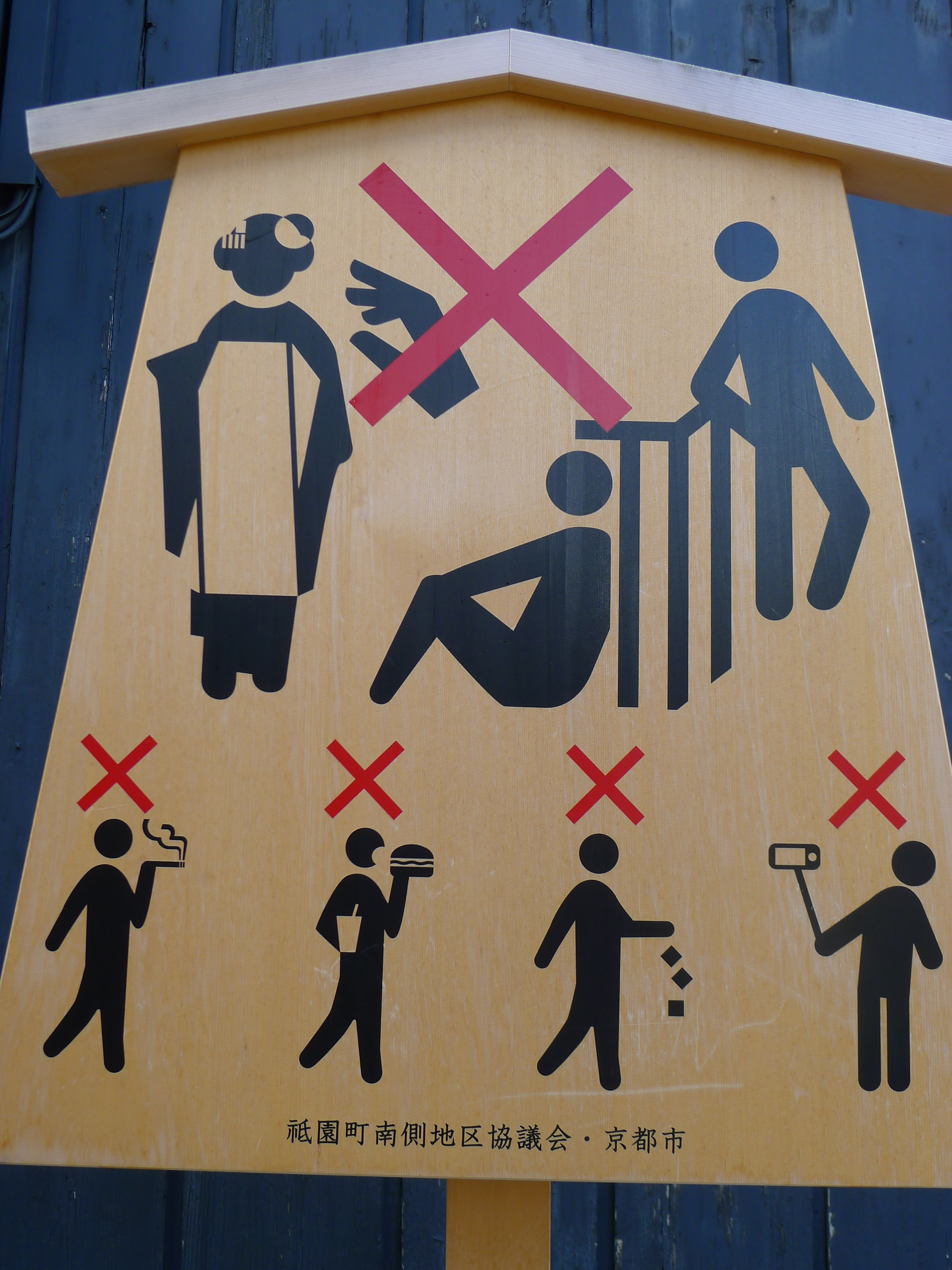
A pictogram sign in Gion, Kyoto prohibiting various activities, including touching geisha or littering

Kyoto officials instituted a US$92 fine for tourists taking photographs of geisha without their permission, and prohibited tourists from visiting some alleys.

The end of COVID-19-related travel restrictions and a weakening Japanese yen have fueled a record-breaking surge in foreign tourism. In response to a surge in foreign tourists at Mount Fuji, Yamanashi Prefecture has set a cap of daily climbers at 4,000 people and began charging an entrance fee of ¥2,000. Also in Yamanashi Prefecture, a mesh barrier was set up to block a view of Mount Fuji behind a Lawson convenience store in Fujikawaguchiko popular with photographers due to tourist-caused disturbances in the area. Tokyo's Shibuya ward restricted Halloween and New Year's Eve gatherings at Shibuya Crossing (which had not been held since 2019 due to COVID-19 and safety issues) in 2023 due to issues with public intoxication caused by overtourism, and introduced an ordinance in 2024 which prohibits public alcohol consumption from 6 p.m. to 5 a.m. year-round (expanding from late-October and late-December).

As of 2024 some Japanese officials have considered instituting a two-tiered pricing system which would have foreign tourists pay more than residents at certain tourist attractions to counter the effects of overtourism.

Public backlash against overtourism in Japan was cited by analysts as a factor behind the ultraconservative Sanseitō party's gains in the 2025 Japanese House of Councillors election.

=== Nepal ===
Mount Everest has become so overtouristed that climbers die of altitude sickness because of the delays caused by overcrowding. As of 2020 the Nepalese government was planning to limit permits to those who had climbed another Nepalese peak 21,325 feet (6,500 m).

=== Netherlands ===
Amsterdam instituted a daily tourist tax in 2019, eliminated official tours of the Red Light District in 2020, and launched a "Stay Away" marketing campaign.

=== Palau ===
The government of Palau, a Pacific Island nation whose tourism accounts for 85% of its GDP, has proposed since 2017 a bill to transform the country into a "luxury only" destination, such as by permitting only five-star hotels and stimulating visitors' personal spending—with a focus on "quality rather than quantity"—, in order to curb overtourism.

=== Peru ===
As of 2019, Peru limits visitors to Machu Picchu to 5000 per day, but UNESCO believes the limit should be halved. Starting in 2014 foreign tourists were required to hire a guide. In 2020 the site was planning to issue 5,940 tickets per day, which is more than twice the 2,500 UNESCO recommends to preserve the ruins.

=== Philippines ===
Boracay is an island in the Western Visayas region of the Philippines, noted for its white sand beaches and warm climate. In December 2025 the island recorded 227,828 visitors. Boracay gained international attention in the 1970s after German writer Jens Peters wrote about the island, and appearances in films such as The Losers and Too Late the Hero further increased its visibility. Initially popular as a budget backpacker destination with gradual growth, the island's tourism industry expanded significantly in the 1990s and was subsequently amplified by social media and increased arrivals from higher-income countries. The growth of tourism generated revenue and employment but also produced environmental and social challenges. On 26 April 2018, President Rodrigo Duterte ordered a six-month closure of the island to address pollution and environmental degradation attributed in part to tourism-related activities. During the closure, the government enforced the 30-meter beach easement rule, which required the removal of structures located within 30 meters of the shoreline. The enforcement prompted concerns about displacement and unemployment, as many local businesses and residents depend primarily on tourism and have limited alternative employment options. Rapid visitor growth also strained the island's waste management and sewage systems. Reports indicated daily waste generation of 90-115 tons while disposal capacity was approximately 30 tons per day, contributing to beach pollution and algal blooms. Sewage infrastructure was upgraded with expanded coverage to Barangay Balabag and portions of Yapak, by the end of 2025 sewage coverage was reported at about 67%, an increase from 61% in 2024. The upgrades were estimated to have served roughly 230 households, around 1,150 people. To mitigate environmental impact, authorities established a tourist limit of approximately 19,200 and implemented restrictions including bans on liquor, smoking, bonfires, gambling, and beach parties.

=== Portugal ===
Sintra suffers from long queues, pollution, traffic, and a lack of grocery stores and pharmacies due to receiving 5,000 visitors a day for attractions such as Pena Palace.

=== Spain ===
In Barcelona protesters have demonstrated in tourist beaches and other tourist-heavy neighborhoods and anti-tourist graffiti has appeared. By 2013, 9,000,000 visitors were touring Park Güell annually, and officials limited entry to the park to 800 an hour. The New Yorker said, "Park Güell's shift from a shared public space into a cultural zone occupied almost exclusively by tourists is understood by some worried residents of Barcelona as a story about the prospective fate of the city itself." According to Albert Arias, a geographer with the Barcelona government, the selling of tickets was "a very bad solution," that "is acknowledging a problem by fencing off public space." Airbnb has contributed to overtourism, with in some sections of town experiencing a 45% decline in resident population between 2007 and 2019 due to investors purchasing properties to use as short-term rentals via the platform. By 2017 tourism had become a top concern among city officials, with a survey showing 60% of residents believed Barcelona had "reached or exceeded" its capacity to accommodate tourism. In 2020 Barcelona was planning to limit cruise ships. In April 2020 a proposal for radical change in the organisation of the city, the Manifesto for the Reorganisation of the city after COVID-19, was published in Barcelona by architecture and urban theorist Massimo Paolini, signed by 160 academics and 300 architects. The Manifesto is radically critical towards the touristification and commodification of the city, proposing to: "eliminate cruise ships", "maintain the current dimensions of the airport", "stimulate touristic degrowth", and "eliminate any investment to promote the 'Barcelona brand'".

Other overtouristed areas in Spain include the Canary Islands, Malaga, Mallorca, and Alicante.

=== Thailand ===
Maya Bay was closed to the public after overtourism caused environmental issues. Ao Phang Nga National Park was listed in 2017 in Fodor's list of places not to go in 2018 because of overtourism.

=== United Kingdom ===
In Scotland, the Isle of Skye advised visitors not to come unless they had overnight lodging booked.

In England in 2024, the tourist board of Thanet Council, which governs a popular tourist area in Kent, suggested that the council should levy a tourist tax, but it was refused.

Some towns and villages in the Cotswolds have also experienced high numbers of visitors. This has caused problems for residents in places such as Bourton-on-the-Water and Bibury who struggle with parking tourism congestion. In March 2024 coaches were banned from Bourton-on-the-Water.

=== United States ===
The Roosevelt Island Tramway in New York City by 2024 had the ridership exceeding pre COVID-19 levels after the tram appeared in tourists' social media posts; there were calls to give priority boarding to Roosevelt Island residents and employees due to increasing crowding. The Roosevelt Island Operating Corporation refused to implement a priority-boarding system, saying it violated a state law against giving "undue or unreasonable preference" to any group of riders.

=== Vietnam ===
In Hanoi in October 2019, a train had to make an emergency stop because of tourists on the tracks taking selfies.

== Criticism of the phrase overtourism ==
There is no agreement as to when the phrase was coined and by whom. The first known use of "over-tourism" was in a 1986 article by Max Börlin in 1986 where he noted that: Like over-fishing, over-tourism can deplete the natural resource on which tourism depends, with resulting heavy hidden costs. Other scholars point to an article by journalist Freya Petersen in the Sydney Morning Herald on 15 December 2001.

However, overtourism only became a widely used phrase in 2016 after it was featured in an article by Skift, a travel industry news and research company. Skift's use of the term brought global attention to a growing problem of perceptions of excessive tourism, sparking conversations about how to manage tourism more sustainably. In 2018, following greater use of the word, Oxford Dictionary named 'overtourism' as one of its 2018 Words of the Year. This followed a campaign from The Daily Telegraph for the word to be recognised in its annual list.

In April 2023, Michael O'Regan, a lecturer of tourism at Glasgow Caledonian University, wrote an article for Geography Directions criticising the word. O'Regan had previously argued in articles from 2022 that overtourism is made up word, or a discursive formation, like "immigration crisis" or "welfare dependency", which frames tourism as a crisis or threat, and fuels debates over border control, degrowth and management of tourists. Based on a Twitter social network analysis, O'Regan found the #overtourism network is held together by a small number of experts, who play a key role in presenting, distributing and circulating information about the topic.

Also in 2023, Ali Rafat of Skift wrote an article entitled "It Is Time to Ditch the Phrase 'Overtourism'", where he argued that "[t]here are an increasing number of professionals pointing out 'overtourism' is not a useful analytical concept for measuring mismanagement and directing attention only towards tourists, rather than facilitators of tourism, such as policymakers and license providers. Destinations are trying to move beyond overtourism and look for other ways to talk about complex tourism issues without just blaming tourists for all the ills."

== See also ==
- Tourist motivation
- Congestion pricing
- Conspicuous consumption
- Conspicuous leisure
- Departure tax
- Ecotourism
- Hotel tax
- Impacts of tourism
- Instagram tourism
- Luxury tax
- Opposition to immigration
- Pop-culture tourism
- Price discrimination
- Sumptuary law
- Sustainable tourism
- Tax incidence
- Tourist trap
- Tourist tax
- Tragedy of the commons
- Urban vitality
- Veblen good
- Tourismphobia
