= Symbolic power =

Sociological concept

The concept of symbolic power, also known as symbolic domination (pouvoir symbolique and domination symbolique in French language) or symbolic violence, was first introduced by French sociologist Pierre Bourdieu to account for the tacit, almost unconscious modes of cultural/social domination occurring within the social habits maintained over conscious subjects. Symbolic power accounts for discipline used against another to confirm that individual's placement in a social hierarchy, at times in individual relations but most basically through system institutions also.

Also referred to as soft power, symbolic power includes actions that have discriminatory or injurious meaning or implications, such as gender dominance and racism. Symbolic power maintains its effect through the mis-recognition of power relations situated in the social matrix of a given field. While symbolic power requires a dominator, it also requires the dominated to accept their position in the exchange of social value that occurs between them.

== History ==
The concept of symbolic power may be seen as grounded in Friedrich Engels' concept of false consciousness. To Engels, under capitalism, objects and social relationships themselves are embedded with societal value that is dependent upon the actors who engage in interactions themselves. Without the illusion of natural law governing such transactions of social and physical worth, the proletariat would be unwilling to consciously support social relations that counteract their own interests. Dominant actors in a society must consciously accept that such an ideological order exists for unequal social relationships to take place. Louis Althusser further developed it in his writing on what he called Ideological State Apparatuses, arguing that the latter's power is partly based on symbolic repression.

The concept of symbolic power was first introduced by Pierre Bourdieu in La Distinction. Bourdieu suggested that cultural roles are more dominant than economic forces in determining how hierarchies of power are situated and reproduced across societies. Status and economic capital are both necessary to maintain dominance in a system, rather than just ownership over the means of production alone. The idea that one could possess symbolic capital in addition and set apart from financial capital played a critical role in Bourdieu's analysis of hierarchies of power.

For example, in the process of reciprocal gift exchange in the Kabyle society of Algeria, when there is an asymmetry in wealth between the two parties, the better-endowed giver "can impose a strict relation of hierarchy and debt upon the receiver." Symbolic power, therefore, is fundamentally the imposition of categories of thought and perception upon dominated social agents who, once they begin observing and evaluating the world in terms of those categories—and without necessarily being aware of the change in their perspective—then perceive the existing social order as just. This, in turn, perpetuates a social structure favored by and serving the interests of those agents who are already dominant. Symbolic power differs from physical violence in that it is embedded in the modes of action and structures of cognition of individuals, and imposes the specter of legitimacy of the social order.

== See also ==
- Caciquism
- Power (social and political)
- Social dominance theory
- Structural violence
- Slavoj Žižek
