= Cultural reproduction =

Cultural concept

Cultural reproduction, a concept first developed by French sociologist and cultural theorist Pierre Bourdieu, is the mechanisms by which existing cultural forms, values, practices, and shared understandings (i.e., norms) are transmitted from generation to generation, thereby sustaining the continuity of cultural experience across time. In other words, reproduction, as it is applied to culture, is the process by which aspects of culture are passed on from person to person or from society to society. This often occurs through the relationship between parent's and their children. Cultural reproduction occurs through the normalization of behavior, language, and mannerisms that are passed down, often without being explicitly questioned.

Cultural reproduction often results in social reproduction, or the process of transferring aspects of society (such as class) intergenerationally. There are various ways in which such reproduction can take place. Often, groups of people, notably social classes, may act to reproduce the existing social structure so as to preserve their advantage. Likewise, processes of schooling in modern societies are among the main mechanisms of cultural reproduction, and do not operate solely through what is taught in courses of formal instruction. Historically, people have moved from different regions, taking with them certain cultural norms and traditions. Cultures transmit aspects of behaviour that individuals learn in an informal way while they are out of the home. This interaction between individuals, which results in the transfer of accepted cultural norms, values, and information, is accomplished through a process known as socialisation. At birth, a child is shaped by a combination of what is given to them naturally, their environmental conditions, and the values or resources passed down to them from their parents.

== Methods ==
The method through which cultural reproduction is perpetuated varies by the socialising agent's relative location, awareness, and intention to reproduce social or cultural norms.

=== Enculturation ===
Enculturation can be described as "a partly conscious and partly unconscious learning experience when the older generation invites, induces, and compels the younger generation to adopt traditional ways of thinking and behaving."

Although, in many ways enculturation duplicates the norms and traditions of previous generations, the degree of similarity between the cultures of each successive generation through enculturation may vary. This concept could be demonstrated by the tendency of each successive generation to follow cultural norms, such as the concept of right-of-way in transportation. These expectations are set forth and replicated by the prior generation. For example, there may be little if any empirical evidence supporting a choice of driving in one lane or another, yet with each new generation, the accepted norm of that individual's culture is reinforced and perpetuated.

Parents and educators prove to be two of the most influential enculturating forces of cultural reproduction.

=== Diffusion ===
Comparatively, diffusion is the dispersion of cultural norms and behaviours between otherwise unrelated groups or individuals. For example, the integration of Chinese food or French linguistics into American culture both represent this concept.

== History of Bourdieu and reproduction theory ==
The concept of cultural reproduction was first developed by French sociologist and cultural theorist Pierre Bourdieu in the early 1970s. Initially, Bourdieu's work pertained to education in modern society, believing that the education system was used solely to 'reproduce' the culture of the dominant class in order for the elite to continue to hold and release power.

Bourdieu's theories recognizably build upon the conjectures of Ludwig Wittgenstein, Maurice Merleau-Ponty, Edmund Husserl, Georges Canguilhem, Karl Marx, Gaston Bachelard, Max Weber, Émile Durkheim, and Norbert Elias, among others. Beginning to study socialisation and how dominant culture and certain norms and traditions affected many social relations, Bourdieu's ideas were especially similar to those of Louis Althusser's notion of Ideological State Apparatuses, which had emerged around the same time. Bourdieu's sociological work was dominated by an analysis of the mechanisms of reproduction of social hierarchies. In opposition to Marxist analyses, Bourdieu criticised the primacy given to the economic factors, and stressed that the capacity of social actors to actively impose and engage their cultural productions and symbolic systems plays an essential role in the reproduction of social structures of domination. Playing an essential part in Bourdieu's sociological analysis is what he called symbolic violence: the capacity to ensure that the predictability of the social order is ignored—or mis-recognised as natural—and thus to ensure the legitimacy of social structures.

In regards to cultural reproduction, one of the main concepts of Bourdieu was introduced in Cultural Reproduction and Social Reproduction (1970), written with Jean-Claude Passeron, in which the writers primarily focus on the structural reproduction of disadvantages and inequalities that are caused by cultural reproduction.

According to Bourdieu, inequalities are recycled through the education system and other social institutions. Bourdieu believed that the prosperous and affluent societies of the West were becoming the cultural capital. High social class, familiarity with bourgeois culture, and educational credentials determined one's life chances. It was biased towards those of higher social class and aided in conserving social hierarchies. This system concealed and neglected individual talent and academic meritocracy. Along with Reproduction in Education, Culture and Society, Bourdieu demonstrated most of his known theories in his book The Inheritors (1964). Both books established him as a progenitor of "reproduction theory."

Bourdieu also pioneered many procedural frameworks and terminologies, emphasising the role of practice and embodiment in social dynamics. Such concepts of Bourdieu's include:

- cultural, social, and symbolic capital;
- habitus;
- field theory; and
- symbolic violence.

== Education as an agent ==
Pierre Bourdieu's theory of cultural reproduction is concerned with the link between original class membership and ultimate class membership, and how this link is mediated by the education system.

Bourdieu theorizes that what is taught to younger generations is dependent on the varying degrees of social, economic, and cultural capital. Bourdieu suggests that cultural capital is developed through socialization within the child's home, particularly through the influence and involvement of parents. Such cultures have gained cultural capital and are considered the dominant group among the rest. However, in order to acquire cultural capital one must undergo indiscernible learning and these cultural norms must be used in the earliest days of life. Through cultural reproduction, only those members of the dominant culture can acquire knowledge in relation to the way it is taught from within this cultural system. Therefore, those who are not members of the dominant culture are at a disadvantage to receive cultural information, and therefore will remain at a disadvantage. Students who come from families with higher levels of education and high socioeconomic statuses may have advantages because they are often more familiar with the values and expectations of school and cultural mobility. Capitalist societies depend on a stratified social system, where the working class has an education suited for manual labour: leveling out such inequalities would break down the system. Therefore, schools in capitalist societies require a method of stratification, and often choose to do so in a way in which the dominant culture will not lose its hegemony. One method of maintaining this stratification is through cultural reproduction.

According to Alice Sullivan (2001), the theory of cultural reproduction entails three fundamental propositions:

1. parental cultural capital is inherited by children;
2. children's cultural capital is converted into educational credentials; and
3. educational credentials are a major mechanism of social reproduction in advanced capitalist societies.

There is no clear consensus as to the exact role of education within cultural reproduction; and further to what degree, if any, this system either encourages or discourages topics such as social stratification, resource inequality, and discrepancies in access to opportunities. It is believed, however, that the primary means in which education determines an individual's social status, class, values, and hierarchy, is through the distribution of cultural capital. This notion of cultural capital accumulation, and the degree to which an individual attains cultural capital, determines the individual's access to resources and opportunities.

There are, however several competing ideologies and explanations that have been significantly discussed.

=== Hidden curriculum ===
The concept of education as an agent of cultural reproduction is argued to be less directly explained by the material and a subject taught, but rather more so through what is known as the hidden curriculum. This refers to the socialisation aspect of the education process through which an adolescent acquires "appropriate attitudes and values" needed to further succeed within the confines of education. An adolescent's success or failure within the formal education system is a function of both their ability to demonstrate both measures of formal educational qualifications, as well as the attainment of the aforementioned qualities acquired through socialisation mechanisms. This may also be referred to as code switching. Code switching is when a student shifts their behavior, language, or mannerisms depending on the setting that they are in, often to help better navigate different social environments. This nature of education is reproduced throughout all stages of the system; from primary to post-secondary. The ability of a student to progress to each subsequent level requires mastery of the prior. One's ability to successfully complete the process of educational attainment strongly correlates to the capacity to realise adequate pay, occupational prestige, social status, etc. upon workforce participation.

=== Parsonian functionalism ===
Education provides functional prerequisites—known as Parsonian functionalism—states that education's function is to provide individuals with the necessary values and attitudes for future work. This forms the assumption that, regardless of the trade an individual participates in, they will all need a similar set of social skills for their day-to-day interactions. From this concept, the idea of education as an ideological state apparatus emerged, elaborating on the prior by continuing that both family and school work together to reproduce social classes, occupational hierarchy, value orientation, and ideology.

=== Education system as capitalist system ===
Education mirrors the capitalist system, in that it sorts individuals and assigns them the skills necessary to fulfil their destined occupation. An individual is provided the appropriate attitude that should be observed within the labour force. Further, it establishes an "acceptance to the reproduction of submissive attitude to the established order."

With this, education's primary role is believed to be as a method of sorting individuals rather than equally educating: those with high levels of accumulated social capital from parents or other sources are more easily able to excel within the system of education. Thus, these individuals will continue on a track that places them into specialised and comparatively highly prestigious occupations. In contrast, those with little social or cultural capital will maintain low levels throughout the process of education and be placed into occupations with little demand for cultural capital—significantly less specialised and prestigious occupation. With this occupational selection, both the individuals will maintain the cultural norms and social status associated with each outside of their occupations as well. Job performance, as it relates to cultural capital, is also shaped by the different ways individuals are socialized to think and behave. Individuals from working class backgrounds often value teamwork, community, rule following, and cooperation. Whereas those from middle and upper class backgrounds tend to value independence, individual achievement, and influence. However, institutions such as schools and workplaces in the United States predominantly reward forms of behavior associated with middle and upper social class values, notably independence. As a result, working class individuals may appear to underperform, not because they are less capable, but because they are being evaluated according to standards that do not align with their strengths or socialization. Sorting individuals, also known as tracking, separates students into different levels, such as advanced placement, honors, and regular classes. Although tracking is often presented as a way to group students based on ability, it is also influenced by race and social class. As a result, this separations creates differences in expectations for student learning, quality of teaching, and access to opportunities. Students of color and those from working class backgrounds are more likely to be placed in lower tracks. These lower tracks often have less experienced teachers, slower paced instruction, and fewer opportunities for creativity and critical thinking. Consequently, this can affect students preparations for postsecondary education and future success. In contrast, students in higher tracks, such as honors or AP classes, typically receive better quality teaching, greater academic challenges, and stronger preparation for higher education. Track placement can also influence how students see themselves. Students in higher tracks often develop greater confidence and receive more academic support. Whereas students in lower tracks may face lower expectations and may begin to doubt their academic abilities. Over time, these lowered expectations can negatively impact students performance, reinforcing existing inequalities.

With any of the concepts, whether considering the intrinsic value of education or the externally-perceived value, each unit of educational attainment requires forgone earnings to attain. Insomuch as an individual would have to sacrifice wages in order to gain an additional unit of education. Outside of forgone monetary earnings, there are also direct expenses such as tuition, supplies, books, etc. one must consider when acquiring education, as well as less direct psychic costs. With this there is an economic consideration and trade-off an individual must consider in their further education aspirations. One who has resources and the desire to continue education has a significant comparative advantage to an individual who by comparison does not. This financial aspect of educational acquirement proves as yet another consideration in the reproductive nature of education.

One who successfully completes the process of educational attainment incurs a significant comparative advantage over a similar individual who does not. Thus the degree to which education reproduces cultural and social norms already present in the underlying society stands to prove a significant factor in the continued propagation of these established norms. With this harsh divide between individuals who do and do not complete the process of formal education, social stratification and inequality between the two groups emerges. This further confirms cultural norms and reproduces the same system upon each successive generation.

== See also ==
- Cultural capital
- Social reproduction
