= Science of Science and Reflexivity =

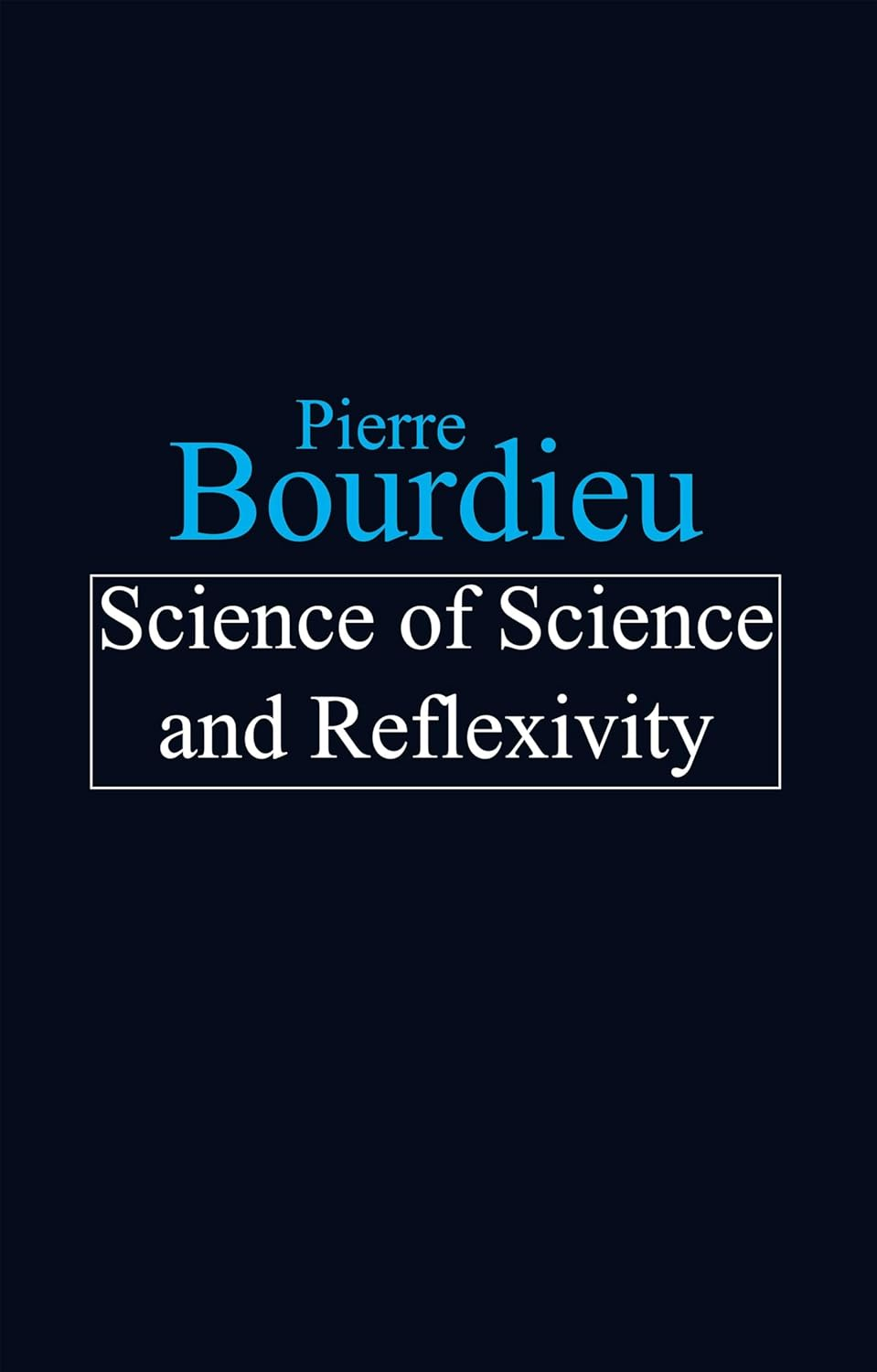
- Author: Pierre Bourdieu
- Language: English
- Subjects: Sociology of science History of science Sociology of scientific knowledge
- Publisher: The University of Chicago Press
- Publication date: 2004
- Pages: 168
- ISBN: 0226067378

Science of Science and Reflexivity is a book on the sociology of science by Pierre Bourdieu, published in 2004 by the University of Chicago Press.

It was published in French in 2001 by Editions Raisons d' Agir as Science de la science et réflexivite.

== Synopsis ==
Translated into English shortly after the death of Bourdieu and based on his final course given at the College de France, this book defends science's and sociology's capacity to produce objective, transhistorical truths although – or perhaps because – it is based on determined socio-historical and cultural conditions.

Science's "historical production of transhistorical truths" stems, according to Bourdieu, from the fact that scientists, in their pursuits, agree that their productions are vetted by their most direct and prepared antagonists and competitors. In making this case, Bourdieu mobilizes his concepts of "field", "habitus", "disposition", and "symbolic capital".

The book is organized in three parts: the first is an overview of the field of science studies; the second illustrates Bourdieu's own theory; and the third, presented as a discussion on the need for reflexivity in the sociology of science, includes an autobiographical account of Bourdieu's own trajectory.

== Content ==
The book's first section, titled "The state of the question", is an account of sociology-of-science studies, discussing Robert Merton, Thomas Kuhn, and the more recent scholars David Bloor, Barry Barnes, Harry Collins, Steven Shapin, and Karin Knorr-Cetina, and focusing a rather severe critique on the work of Bruno Latour. The critique of Latour's constructivist work, of his laboratory studies and actor network theory, is considered by most readers as being dogmatic, as not fully justified, or as based on a misreading of Latour's theses. According to sociologist Charles Camic, Bourdieu in this first section of his book appears to believe that important work had already been done by himself, which "the new sociologists of science vociferously discover and reveal".

Bourdieu believes that science in general, sociology in particular, are subject to a double threat: one external, from socioeconomic and political incursions against the autonomy of science; and one internal, from sociological deconstruction that denies science's capacity to achieve objective knowledge and transhistorical truths. In his view, the second challenge may provide ammunition to the first.

In the book's second section, titled "A world apart", Bourdieu summarizes his own science-of-science framework based on the concepts of habitus, practices, field, and symbolic capital. Field is intended – as in physics – as a space governed by the relative forces of the actors that occupy it, with incumbents endowed with larger symbolic capital that exerts stronger action to preserve or modify the field itself. Symbolic capital includes scientific capital proper (personal or of the researcher's affiliation) and administrative/temporal capital, linked, e.g., to power in the allocation of resources. "Disposition" can be, for example,

'a rejection of the heroic and revolutionary'; a rebeliousnes toward the educational system; or audacity, elegance, and ease,

while "habitus" is practices differentiated according to variables of sex, social origin, and disciplinary customs and dispositions.

A key passage in this, the book's second part, concerns Bourdieu's vision of the Archimedean point of view achieved by science (the italics are Bourdieu's):

The fact that producers tend to have as their clients only their most rigorous and vigorous competitors, the most competent and the most critical, those therefore most inclined and most able to give their critique full force, is for me the Archimedean point on which one can stand to give a scientific account of scientific reason, to rescue scientific reason from relativistic reduction, and to explain how science can constantly progress toward more rationality without having to appeal to some kind of founding miracle.

What is it that makes research "a world apart"? Bourdieu lists five elements that distinguish science from other human endeavors. These are a faith in rationality; a belief in, or assertion of, the disinterestedness of science that he calls a scientific illusio; instruments and epistemological tools that are used in science; mathematics; and the experimental method. This could, however, for a commentator, be just Bourdieu's 'own brand of socioanalysis'.

In the book's third section, "Why the social sciences must take themselves as an object", Bourdieu analyzes what the social sciences need to do to become scientific. The comparison with the natural sciences indicates that part of the natural sciences' success flows from their having won a relative autonomy from the rest of society. Social inquiry is more entangled with societal interests and pressures. In Bourdieu's words,

One may wonder why the social sciences have so much difficulty in winning recognition of their autonomy, why it is so hard to gain acceptance for a discovery outside the field or even within it. The social sciences, especially sociology, have an object too important (it interests everyone, starting with the powerful), too controversial, for it to be left to their discretion [...] for them to be granted the same degree of autonomy as is given to the other sciences.

Social investigators can overcome these challenges by becoming especially reflexive of their own presuppositions and biases in the pursuit of their investigations.

Part 3 also contains a self-analysis from the author, who shows how he is willing to apply reflexivity to himself, offering to the reader an analysis of how his own habitus and dispositions have evolved over his career.

For Theodore Schatzki, Bourdieu's theory for a sociohistorical enterprise leading to transhistorical truths, couched in his habitus-practice-field framework, is very close to Jürgen Habermas' idea that scientific disputes are settled by “the force of the better argument.” For sociologist David R. Inglis, Bourdieu's framework is close to Karl Popper’s idea of constant ‘conjectures and refutations’. For Bourdieu, however, neither Habermas nor Popper specifies the societal arrangements that bring about the outcome.

An effective summary of Bourdieu's thesis in this book is offered by Inglis:

In sum, then, the scientific field’s antagonistic relations, far from undercutting the pursuit of truth, are in fact the preconditions for such a pursuit, but only so long as the field itself is autonomous of external forces which would otherwise pervert its dialogical operations.
