= Academic capital =

In sociology, academic capital is the potential of an individual's education and other academic experience to be used to gain a place in society. Much like other forms of capital (social, economic, cultural), academic capital doesn't depend on one sole factor—the measured duration of schooling—but instead is made up of many different factors, including the individual's academic transmission from their family, status of the academic institutions attended, and publications produced by the individual.

== History ==
Academic capital originated in 1979 when Pierre Bourdieu (1930–2002), a prominent French sociologist, used the term in his book Distinction: A Social Critique of the Judgment of Taste (translated to English in 1984). The book attempts to show how individuals are not defined by social class, but instead by their "social space", which is dependent on each type of capital the individual has. He explained:

"Academic capital is in fact the guaranteed product of the combined effects of cultural transmission by the family and cultural transmission by the school (the efficiency of which depends on the amount of cultural capital directly inherited from the family)" (23).

While Bourdieu discussed social capital, economic capital, and cultural capital at length, he did not explore academic capital in equal detail. His 1986 essay, "The Forms of Capital" does not refer to academic capital as one of the main types of capital that affects the success of individuals; therefore he does not see academic capital as being as important as other kinds.

Since Bourdieu first coined the term, it has been used widely—from France, the United States, Australia and Sweden—to discuss many of the implications involved with schooling and the rise of individuals in academia. Numerous studies have been done involving the idea of academic capital, and scholars have disagreed on what counts as academic capital.

Bourdieu's definition of the term is applicable to any individual: even an individual interviewing for a secretarial position would benefit from having more schooling than another candidate. However, it seems that most references to academic capital refer solely to professional teachers and researchers within higher education. For example, in 2009, Michael Burawoy defined academic capital as being estimated from an individual's curriculum vitae, but admitted that it was subjective because some fields of study seem to value certain academic qualities more than others—research, in psychology or study abroad, for scholars in linguistics.

Academic capital is not to be confused with other terms that sound familiar—academic capitalism, intellectual capital. Intellectual capital is a business term for the collective knowledge in an organization, considered a capital cost. Academic capitalism is when universities act like profit-seeking organizations that market the knowledge that they can give to students, or clients.

== Measurement ==
While there is not one specific way to measure academic capital, researchers throughout the world have enacted studies that quantify an individual's academic capital. Some of the ways researchers have attempted to measure academic capital are through:

- Years of schooling
- Number of publications
- Amount of teaching experience
- Strength of an individual's professional network
- Number of academic exchanges (like Fulbright fellowships)
- Research experience

== Effect ==
On an individual level, academic capital influences and informs several important aspects of life. In the most basic sense, academic capital is strongly tied to earning potential. Individuals with only a high school diploma, on average, make over $20,000 less annually than individuals with an undergraduate degree, according to the U.S. Bureau of Labor Statistics. For individuals who do not have a high school diploma, opportunities for monetary earning fall below $30,000 less than those with an undergraduate degree.

Whereas the biggest stepping stone to attain a higher paying career used to be an undergraduate degree, the common discussion in today's market is the devalued status of a Bachelor's degree. A Bachelor's degree no longer holds the same academic capital it used to, and holding such a degree no longer entitles one to the same job opportunities and income possibilities it used to. Government statistics reveal that over the past 8 years, the average weekly earnings of individuals with bachelor's degrees have actually decreased, in relation to inflation, by nearly 2%. Therefore, many individuals are studying beyond four-year institutions in order to increase their capital and ultimately their income. When compared to an individual with a bachelor's degree, an individual with a graduate degree makes, on average, nearly $75,000 more annually.

In broader terms, a person's academic capital affects their career opportunities and ultimately their career decisions. Again, with the diminished status of an undergraduate degree, individuals need to attend further schooling in order to increase their academic capital and their opportunities in the job market. Academic capital doesn't influence only one's final career choice, but also influences a person's social standing and clout. Holding a doctoral degree or graduate degree earns a person a certain social esteem that those with only a high school diploma often do not receive. It also affects a person's social networking, as those with higher education have had access and exposure to others following similar paths. It will affect where a person lives (due both to financial opportunities and social networking) and, ultimately, where their children go to school, creating a cyclical, interwoven relationship between schooling and social status.

An individual's academic capital does not affect only their own personal life, but also the lives of those around them, like their children or, in the case of teachers, their students. Several studies suggest that a teacher's qualifications and academic capital have a direct relationship with their students' success. What makes this issue of great concern is that teachers with high levels of academic capital are not distributed evenly throughout the population. According to the Illinois Education Research Council, as levels of poverty and minority populations increase within a school, the number of teachers with high academic capital strongly decrease. Just the reverse was true in school systems with low levels of poverty and minority students—at such schools, the number of teachers with high academic capital strongly outnumbered the teachers with a low academic capital as much as 40 to 1. Since there is a direct correlation between a teacher's academic capital and their students' success, it is concerning to consider that students who find themselves in low income, high minority schools will not have the same opportunity to grow and expand their own academic capital as would similar students at an institute with lower poverty and minority rates.

The Illinois Education Research Council acknowledges that academic capital is only one of the many things that constitute a teacher's success in the classroom; however, its report refers to a study that used student value-added data to determine a direct link between a student's progress and their teacher's academic capital. A similar study done in the state of Texas came to comparable conclusions that the skill level of a teacher informs the students' success. While much of the discussion focuses on the general lack of qualifications held by some current educators in the system, the overarching theme is that the higher the qualifications and skill set, the better the outcome for the student.

As much as a teacher has a role in a child's development and ability to acquire the academic capital that will prepare him or her for further education, the role of the parent cannot be overlooked. The parents, to begin with, set the child up for the type of education he/she will receive early in life. The family's economic background and locale will determine the type of school the child attends, therefore influencing the teachers the child will have, and ultimately informing the opportunity for academic capital. Aside from that, the culture of the family, what the family values and respects, will inform a child's decision to attend higher education as opposed to joining the work force or pursuing alternate paths. Even if children do manage to step outside their family name and expectations, their family can still influence their academic capital. A child whose father attended an Ivy league school, for example, may still have more social clout than he would ordinarily have even if he himself did not attend college. Similarly, an individual from a working-class family, a first generation college student, may not attain full academic capital due to their familial association.

== Relation with cultural capital ==
Bourdieu argues that academic capital is affected by cultural capital, and vice versa. If one has a high degree of schooling, then it is likely that he or she will have more cultural capital—perhaps skills in painting or music—because he or she has been in the education system longer. Similarly, those individuals who do not value education would not likely value the cultural practices that education enforces, like visiting museums or attending drama performances. In a study done by Javier Rojas regarding cultural capital and academic achievement in Mexico, by looking at the academic level and the participation in cultural activities (art gallery, opera, museum, symphony, etc.) of fifteen-year-olds in Mexico, the amount of cultural intake was directly proportional to the level of academic achievement in the students.

However, it has been argued that Bourdieu's research on the different types of capital does not actually explain a relationship; rather that it simply demonstrates a cycle.

== Further opinions ==
The definition and effects of academic capital have been widely contested for a variety of reasons. While Bourdieu initially claims that academic capital is simply measured by the duration of schooling, other studies have posited that factors such as family and social capital, as well as culture, affect academic capital.

Keith Roe argues that academic capital is more than the duration of schooling. He states that "students from privileged backgrounds may squander their cultural inheritance and some students from less privileged backgrounds are able to overcome their cultural disadvantages as a result of exceptional ability and certain features of their family background." This idea contrasts the notion that duration is the only measure of academic capital, since a student may go to four-year university while another goes to two-year junior college, but if the four-year student isn't invested in academics he doesn't utilize the capital.

Roe believes that academic capital is the "guaranteed product of the interaction of cultural transmission by the family and by the school." He explains that factors like economic and cultural capital affect the accumulation and retention of academic capital. Roe finds that social class influences the acquisition of academic capital:

"A general opposition is found within each social class between the fractions richest in cultural capital and poorest in economic capital and those richest in economic capital and poorest in cultural capital. Those who have acquired the bulk of their cultural capital in and for school are found to have more 'classical', safer, cultural investments than those who have received a large cultural inheritance."

Therefore, economic capital and cultural capital have the ability to influence the type of academic capital that one accrues both within schools and at home. The fact that people who gain most of their cultural capital in schools are considered to have more legitimate tastes and preferences makes it seem like they have more academic capital in some cases.

In her dissertation "The Effects of Secondary School Climate on Students' Academic Success," Margaret Johansson explores the idea that "connectedness to the school community of teachers and peers … allows the student to use the social capital of the school to maximize education gains." It also addresses the "moderating effect of the parent-adolescent relationship on the link between school climate and academic outcomes," which relates to the idea that academic capital isn't just measured by the duration of schooling, but also the quality. Johansson addresses the idea that "family social capital and school social capital [are] determinants of secondary school success." Two students who attend similar four-year colleges should have the same amount of social capital if duration of schooling is the only determinant, but it has been noted that students from certain social and cultural groups gain more academic capital than their peers.

Kevin Marjoribanks, a preeminent scholar in the international education community over several decades, argues that "family background, childhood social and academic capital, and adolescents' social capital combine to have medium to large associations with adolescents' aspirations." He also indicates that "within encompassing family backgrounds, differences in educational outcomes should be examined in relation to children's and parents' perceptions of social and cultural capital and to variations in children's academic capital." His analysis strengthens the argument that the duration of schooling (coupled with its quality) and family and social environments affect aspirations and success.

Some have even argued that society's strong emphasis on gaining academic capital may be a cause of the high rates of cheating and plagiarism in schools. Since gaining academic capital may be the one way for those in academia to move up in their field, greater stress is placed on this form of capital, and therefore pressure can arise to do better than a scholar thinks he or she is capable of, leading them to cheat or plagiarize.

== See also ==
- Pierre Bourdieu
- Social capital
