= Allison Hurst =

American sociologist

Allison L. Hurst is an American sociologist whose research focuses on the sociology of higher education. She teaches at Oregon State University.

== Early life and education ==
Hurst graduated from Barnard College, where she majored in ancient studies, in 1992. She completed a doctorate in sociology at the University of Oregon in 2006.

== Career ==
Hurst was a visiting assistant professor at Kenyon College from 2006 to 2009. She then moved to Furman University, where she taught until 2014, when she was hired as an associate professor at Oregon State University. Her research focuses on the role of social class in the sociology of higher education.

== Books ==
- The burden of academic success : loyalists, renegades, and double agents. Lanham, Maryland: Lexington Books. 2010. ISBN 978-0-7391-4061-1.
- College and the working class : what it takes to make it. Rotterdam: SensePublishers. 2012. ISBN 9789460917523.
- Classical Sociological Theory and Foundations of American Sociology. Oregon State University. December 31, 2018.
- Amplified Advantage: Going to a "Good" College in an Era of Inequality. Lanham, Maryland: Lexington Books. October 18, 2019. ISBN 978-1-4985-8966-6.
