= Benjamin Franklin Jackson =

South Carolinian politician

Benjamin Franklin Jackson represented Charleston County, South Carolina in the South Carolina House of Representatives from 1868 until 1870.

By order of the North Carolina General Assembly he was legitimated and granted certain other rights.

He was a Baptist missionary and church organizer.
