= Field theory =

Field theory may refer to:

== Science ==
- Field (mathematics), the theory of the algebraic concept of field
- Field theory (physics), a physical theory which employs fields in the physical sense, consisting of three types:
  - Classical field theory, the theory and dynamics of classical fields
  - Quantum field theory, the theory of quantum mechanical fields
  - Statistical field theory, the theory of critical phase transitions
  - Grand Unified Theory

== Social science ==
- Field theory (psychology), a psychological theory which examines patterns of interaction between the individual and his or her environment
- Field theory (sociology), a sociological theory concerning the relationship between social actors and local social orders
