= Jean-Claude Passeron =

French sociologist (1930–2026)

- Born: 26 November 1930; Nice, France
- Died: 30 October 2026 (aged 95)

Education
- Education: École Normale Supérieure

Philosophical work
- Era: 20th-century philosophy
- Region: Western philosophy
- School: Critical sociology
- Institutions: Université de Nantes (before 1968) · Université Paris VIII
- Main interests: Sociology of education

Jean-Claude Passeron (26 November 1930 – 30 October 2026) was a French sociologist and leader in social science studies. As part of a mixed interdisciplinary team involving sociologists, historians, and anthropologists, he led the magazine Enquêtes.

== Life and career ==
In Paris, Jean-Claude Passeron studied philosophy and sociology at École Normale Supérieure. During the 1960s, he and Pierre Bourdieu did two studies of the sociology of education. With Jean-Claude Chamboredon and Bourdieu, he published Le Métier de sociologue, a reference work and epistemology work of the social sciences on cultural reproduction.

Passeron led the sociology department at l'Université de Nantes, going often to Paris to lead studies. In 1968, he was part of the group which founded le Centre Universitaire Expérimental de Vincennes, an avant-garde pedagogic project that today has become l'Université Paris VIII.

He also worked with Jean-Claude Chamboredon, Robert Castel, Claude Grignon, Michel Grumbach and François de Singly. He studied the sociology of culture and the sociology of the arts. In 1991, he published Le Raisonnement sociologique, a book which had an impact on epistemology of the social sciences.

Passeron died on 30 October 2026, aged 95.

== Publications ==
- with Pierre Bourdieu and Michel Eliard, Les Étudiants et leurs études, Paris, La Haye, Mouton, « Cahiers du centre de sociologie Européenne. sociologie de l'éducation », 1, 1964.
- with Pierre Bourdieu, Les Héritiers. Les étudiants et la culture, Paris, Les Éditions de Minuit, 1964.
- with Gérald Antoine, La Réforme de l'Université. Conservatisme et novation à l'Université, avant-propos de Raymond Aron, Paris, Calmann-Lévy, 1966.
- with Robert Castel, Éducation, développement et démocratie. Algérie, Espagne, France, Grèce, Hongrie, Italie, Pays arabes, Yougoslavie, études présentées par Robert Castel, Jean-Claude Passeron, Paris - La Haye, Mouton, « Cahiers du Centre de sociologie européenne », 4, 1967.
- with Pierre Bourdieu et Jean-Claude Chamboredon, Le Métier de sociologue, préalables épistémologiques, Paris, Mouton - Bordas, 1968.
- with Claude Grignon, Expériences françaises avant 1968, Études de cas sur l'innovation dans l'enseignement supérieur, Paris, OCDE, 1970.
- translation with Françoise et Jean-Claude Garcias and presentation by Richard Hoggart, La Culture du pauvre. Étude sur le style de vie des classes populaires en Angleterre (The Uses of literacy), Paris, Éditions de Minuit, « Le sens commun », 1970.
- with Pierre Bourdieu, La Reproduction. Éléments pour une théorie du système d'enseignement, Paris, Éditions de Minuit, « Le sens commun », 1970.
- presentation of Joseph Schumpeter, Impérialisme et classes sociales, traduction de Suzanne de Segonzac et Pierre Bresson, revue et présentée par Jean-Claude Passeron, Paris, Éditions de Minuit, « Le sens commun », 1972
- Les Mots de la sociologie, Nantes, Université de Nantes, 1980.
- with Michel Grumbach, L'Œil à la page : enquête sur les images et les bibliothèques, Paris, Bibliothèque Publique d’Information, 1985.
- with Claude Grignon, Le Savant et le populaire, misérabilisme et populisme en sociologie et en littérature, Paris, Seuil - Gallimard, 1989.
- with E. Pedler, Le Temps donné aux tableaux, Marseille, IMEREC, 1991.
