= Distinction (book) =

1979 book by Pierre Bourdieu

La Distinction
- Cover of the first edition
- Author: Pierre Bourdieu
- Language: French
- Subject: Taste
- Publication place: France
- Media type: Print
- ISBN: 9780674212770

Distinction: A Social Critique of the Judgement of Taste (La Distinction: Critique sociale du jugement, 1979) by Pierre Bourdieu, is a sociological report about the state of French culture, based upon the author's empirical research from 1963 until 1968. The English translation was published in 1984, and, in 1998, the International Sociological Association voted Distinction as the sixth most important work of sociology published in the 20th century.

== Summary ==
As a social critique of the judgements of taste, Distinction (1979) proposes that people with much cultural capital — education and intellect, style of speech and style of dress, etc. — participate in determining what distinct aesthetic values constitute good taste within their society. Circumstantially, people with less cultural capital accept as natural and legitimate that ruling-class definition of taste, the consequent distinctions between high culture and low culture, and their restrictions upon the social conversion of the types of economic capital, social capital, and cultural capital.

The social inequality created by the limitations of their habitus (mental attitudes, personal habits, and skills) renders people with little cultural capital the social inferiors of the ruling class. Because they lack the superior education (cultural knowledge) needed to describe, appreciate, and enjoy the aesthetics of a work of art, "working-class people expect objects to fulfil a function" as practical entertainment and mental diversion, whilst middle-class and upper-class people passively enjoy an objet d'art as a work of art, by way of the gaze of aesthetic appreciation.

The acceptance of socially dominant forms of taste is a type of symbolic violence between social classes, made manifest in the power differential that allows the ruling class to define, impose, and endorse norms of good taste upon all of society. Hence, the naturalization of the distinction of taste and its misrepresentation as socially necessary, deny the dominated classes the cultural capital with which to define their own world. Moreover, despite the dominated classes producing their own definitions of good taste and of bad taste, "the working-class 'aesthetic' is a dominated aesthetic, which is constantly obliged to define itself in [the] terms of the dominant aesthetics" of the ruling class.

== Theory ==
In the development of social-class identity, the aesthetic choices that people make for themselves also create social class factions, which are in-groups that distance members of a social class from each other and from other social classes. The cultural capital taught to children, a predisposition towards a certain cuisine, certain types of music, and a certain taste in art are the distinctions of taste that then guide children to their places in their social class and within the hierarchy of social classes. Such self-selection into a social class is achieved by the child's internalisation of preferences for objects and behaviours particular to a given social class, and the internalisation of a cultural aversion towards the other social classes, a feeling of "disgust, provoked by horror, or visceral intolerance ('feeling sick') of the [bad] tastes of others."

The cultural tastes of the ruling class (communicated through the dominant ideology) determine what is good taste and what is bad taste for the middle class and for the working class. Therefore, the concept of good taste is an example of cultural hegemony, of how a ruling class exercise social control by their possession of the types of capital (social capital, economic capital, cultural capital) that ensure the social reproduction and the cultural reproduction of themselves, as a ruling class. Because persons are taught their cultural tastes in childhood, a person's taste in culture is internalised to their personality, and identify his or her origin in a given social class, which might or might not impede upward social mobility.

== Methodology ==
As researchers, Bourdieu and the statistician Salah Bouhedja applied geometric data analysis, as part of a multiple correspondence analysis, of "the complete system of [social] relations that make up the true principle of the force and form specific to the effects recorded in such and such correlation" using correspondence analysis of the data from two surveys: (i) the "Kodak survey" (1963) and (ii) the "Taste survey" (1967), and subsets of data from the "dominant classes" and from the "Petite bourgeoisie".

== Reception ==
In 1998, the International Sociological Association voted Distinction: A Social Critique of the Judgement of Taste (1979) an important book of 20th-century sociology, like The Civilizing Process (1939), by Norbert Elias and The Social Construction of Reality: A Treatise in the Sociology of Knowledge (1966), by Peter L. Berger and Thomas Luckmann.
