= Jean-Claude Chamboredon =

French sociologist (1938–2020)

- Born: October 1938; Bandol, France
- Died: 30 March 2020 (aged 81)
- Occupation: Sociologist

Jean-Claude Chamboredon (October 1938 – 30 March 2020) was a French sociologist.

He graduated from the École normale supérieure in Paris, and subsequently worked alongside Pierre Bourdieu until 1981. With Bourdieu and Jean-Claude Passeron, Chamboredon wrote Le Métier de sociologue in 1967. In addition to his various sociological works, Chamboredon translated Basil Bernstein's Langage et classes sociales.

== Biography ==
The son of an engineer who became an accountant, he himself was a graduate of the École normale supérieure (Paris) (class of 1959, Humanities section) (1962) and held an agrégation in classical literature (1962). He was born on October 13, 1938, in Bandol, in the Var department.

An advocate for the teaching of social sciences in secondary school, he helped establish the agrégation in economic and social sciences in 1977 and the “khâgne S” (which later became the “khâgne B/L”) in 1982.

In 1988, he became director of studies at the School for Advanced Studies in the Social Sciences in Marseille.

In particular, he is the thesis advisor for Pierre-Paul Zalio and Stéphane Beaud.

== Publications ==
- Un art moyen. Essai sur les usages sociaux de la photographie (1965)
- Le Métier de sociologue (1967)
- Développement économique et changement social. Classe sociale et changement social (1974)
- La philosophie de l'histoire et les sciences sociales (2005)
- Jeunesses et classes sociales (2015)
- Territoires, culture et classes sociales (2019)
