= Social reproduction =

Reproduction of social structures and systems

Social reproduction describes the reproduction of social structures and systems, mainly on the basis of particular preconditions in demographics, education and inheritance of material property or legal titles (as earlier with aristocracy). Reproduction is understood as the maintenance and continuation of existing social relations. Originally formulated by Karl Marx in Das Kapital, this concept is a variety of Marx's notion of economic reproduction.

According to sociologist Pierre Bourdieu, there are four types of capital that contribute to social reproduction in society: economic capital, cultural capital, social capital and symbolic capital.

Social reproduction in this sense is distinct from the term as it is used in Marxist feminism to discuss reproductive labor. In that application, it is used to explain the role of women in wider social and class structures, and their (often unrecognized) contribution to the capitalist economy via their (traditional) role within the household as both child-bearers and family caretakers, and by extension women's role as providers of free labor that is necessary to produce and maintain current and future workers.

== Four types of capital ==
All four of Pierre Bourdieu's forms of capital play a role in social reproduction, as capital is passed from generation to generation and keeps people in the same social class as their parents before them. This keeps reproducing inequality through the system of social stratification. The four types of capital are:

1. Economic capital: the income and wealth of a person, which may well come along with one's inheritance of cultural capital.
2. Cultural capital: the shared outlook, beliefs, knowledge, and skills that are passed between generations, which may in turn influence human capital.
3. Human capital: the education and job training a person receives, and which contributes to the likelihood that one will acquire social capital.
4. Social capital: the social network to which one belongs, which can largely influence one's ability to find opportunities, especially employment.

== In education ==
Social reproduction, when co-opted with cultural reproduction, allows for sociology of education to assume its role. Education is an attempt at leveling the playing field by allowing those in poorer classes opportunities at upward mobility. However, it fails in many critical ways; for example, education is costly: better schools mean better equipment, better books, and better teachers, all of which remain beyond the pay grade of the poverty line. Thus, higher education becomes exclusive to higher classes, leaving people of lower classes with much less to work with, as well as fewer opportunities.

The difference in opportunities between low-income students and privileged students is also prevalent in K-12 schooling. The Coleman Report argues that there are fewer resources available for low-income students, which includes lack of textbook supply, less access to laboratories in STEM (i.e. chemistry and physics labs), and even lower quality cafeterias. If these students were to receive the same resources as privileged students, then they would have a higher success rate, according to Coleman. Over the years, critics of The Coleman Report argue that factors such as quality of teachers are overlooked, and that more context within schools should be cross-examined with factors outside of school.

The education system in many high-income countries polarizes individuals from a young age. It creates elites who care little for those in the classes beneath them and believe that they should earn extraordinarily more than everyone else, all the while defining people by their jobs, concluding that those with low-paid jobs for that reason live in relative poverty. The system strives to maintain the status quo so children can be greatly denigrated. As the rich take in an increasing amount of the country's wealth, there is less and less for the general populace, resulting in poorer education.

=== Education in the United States ===
Statistics show that the majority of dropouts are below the poverty line. Due to a lack of capital, they do not complete their education, seeing it as less convenient to complete schooling rather than find work, and support themselves or their families. Usually, these dropouts consist of the minority groups, such as Hispanics and African Americans. Studies also show that males have a higher rate of dropping out compared to females. Many drop out due to lack of funds to continue their education, some are single parents, or have had a deceased parent, which makes it difficult to study and work at the same time. Many of these factors cumulate into students dropping out, but there is no one issue that explains dropouts. These issues are rarely seen in higher classes, making it less likely for them to drop out and reject opportunities.

== In health and illness ==
The sociology of health and illness studies how social life affects morbidity and mortality rate, and vice versa. Social reproduction is involved in this field when it comes to how inequalities affect the health of people in particular classes.

The greater the economic inequality, the more of a toll it takes on the health of the populace, from life expectancy to infant mortality, and in cases like the U.S., increasing rates of obesity. Studies conducted on the population of high income countries make this apparent. It is not simply poverty, though they do go hand in hand, but it also leads to a gap in social cohesion, which leads the general populace to be more stressed, fearful, and insecure.

In the majority of high-income countries, the top 1% live, on average, 10 years longer than the average 99%, statistically making those born into the poorer classes naturally have a shorter life span. This can be attributed to the top 1% having access to better healthcare. The bottom 99% may be disinclined to visit doctors and take cough medicine for more serious illnesses, and are disadvantaged especially in cases of incurable illnesses like AIDS where constant medicating with expensive, non-subsidized drugs is the only way to sustain a normal life.

Those born into a lower class are at a higher risk of suffering from illness. In the past, the poor suffered from hunger and starvation. However, in high-income countries like the U.S., the opposite is true. Food-insecure families are the most prone to high rates of obesity, especially in children. This can be attributed to the generally higher cost of healthful foods, a lack of education regarding healthy eating habits, and faster preparation times, causing fast foods, or other unhealthy alternatives to be consumed often for their ease of acquisition and generally low price. This leads to long-term epidemiological problems in which children who become obese maintain their obesity into their adult lives, suffering from associated ailments such as heart disease, high blood pressure, increased risk for several types of cancer, type 2 diabetes, stroke, infertility, arthritis, breathing difficulties and/or depression.

== Social class system in the United States ==
Social reproduction is the passing on of social inequality across generations. The upper class has many advantages; having money provides the ability to have even more resources to get ahead. The opposite is true for lower classes, where with less money, there are fewer resources. Marx views this as class domination, causing isolation primarily for said lower classes.

"Capitalism isn't working. Another world is possible," is an argument that is made by many protesters around the world, who gather in rallies more often every year. These protests are more prevalent in higher-income countries where most of the 1% live. The U.S. and the U.K., for example, have a growing social cohesion among protesters because the vast majority of people in rich countries are suffering due to increasing inequalities. Many of the poor have begun to depend on the state rather than their own wages. All the while, their descendants will be raised in a fixed system that favors the elites, so they are bound to the same class they were born in.

Social reproduction revolves around the understanding that rich breed rich, and the poor breed poor— those born into a particular class are more often than not bound to live their lives in that class. The following statistics are of the U.S. population.

=== Lower class ===
The lower class is a class afflicted by a cycle of poverty, homelessness, and unemployment. The cycle of poverty causes suffering from the inability to pay bills— some of the lower class may experience housing instability, many families go hungry at least once per year because of food insecurity, or lack of medical care, as many cannot pay for medication or treatment for potentially fatal illnesses. All the while, this class is usually labelled by the media as being lazy, system abusers, or criminals. Those born into this class have lower class mobility due to restrictions on resources, such as money and access to better education. This class is a point of reference in social reproduction, comprising 15% to 20% of the U.S. population, where the majority are minorities.

=== Working class ===
The working class are usually physical laborers with little to no qualifications because they've received minimal education. They can also be seen working service industries, but are underpaid and have no chance for promotions in their standings. Potentially skilled workers may find better-paying jobs; however, those jobs have a higher chance of being dangerous. Those born into this system usually have a torch of labor passed on to them, following the same profession their family did. The working class comprise 30% to 40% of the U.S. population, and the majority are minorities.

=== Middle class ===
The middle class consists of two divided classes. The lower half bears resemblance to those in lower classes (usually less educated with lower incomes), but can be found in managerial positions, as well as be small business owners. The upper half consists of professionals and educated business owners. Those born into this class have the most diversity, deciding to either take up the torch or surpass their parents. The majority go on to complete their educations and maintain a career. The middle class comprise 40% to 50% of the U.S. population and the majority is a blend of minorities and the privileged group.

=== Upper class ===
The upper class is known to hold 25% of the wealth in the U.S.. Similarly to the middle class, the upper class is divided into two classes. The lower half consists of people with new money, investments, and successful business owners with the majority of this group originally being from the middle class or, rarely, lower class. The upper half consists of families who have been rich for generations, a point of reference in social reproduction brought along the ages. Those born into this class receive inheritances from generations who died before them and so forth. Their descendants are sent off to the finest of schools, leaving them with more opportunities than any of the other social classes. The upper class comprise 1% to 3% of the U.S. population. The lower half can be a blend, whereas the upper half consists of mostly white families.
