= Symbolic violence =

Term coined by the 20th-century French sociologist Pierre Bourdieu

Symbolic violence is a term coined by Pierre Bourdieu, a prominent 20th-century French sociologist, and appears in his works as early as the 1970s. Symbolic violence describes a type of non-physical violence manifested in the power differential between social groups.

It is often unconsciously agreed upon by both parties and is manifested in an imposition of the norms of the group possessing greater social power on those of the subordinate group.

Symbolic violence can be manifested across different social domains such as nationality, gender, sexual orientation, or ethnic identity.

The term began to be used by other sociologists and authors in the early 1990s. Bourdieu made efforts to stress that symbolic violence is generally not a deliberate action by a hegemonic power, but rather an unconscious reinforcement of the status quo that is seen as the “norm” by those who exist within that social stratification.

Slavoj Žižek discusses symbolic violence in Violence (2008), arguing that it is located in the signification of language itself, i.e. the very ways in which we talk to one another sustain relations of domination.

== History ==
The term symbolic violence first appeared in Pierre Bourdieu's work alongside the similar concepts of symbolic power and cultural capital, which make physical analogy to the power differentials between social groups within a hierarchy. Although Bourdieu's La Distinction focused mainly on aesthetics and taste within modern French culture, it established a framework within which he and other sociologists would examine meta-behavior within society as it relates to power, social capital, and individual habitus.

Bourdieu's theory of symbolic violence further elaborates and develops Max Weber's thoughts on the role of legitimation in domination. Power requires justification and belief. The concept of symbolic violence was created to argue that hard power is not sufficient for the effective exercise of power. Symbolic violence finds expression through body language, comportment, self-presentation, bodily care, and adornment.

Since its establishment in the sociological lexicon, symbolic violence has been applied in multiple disciplines of the social sciences and in numerous case studies.

For example, in his Learning Capitalist Culture (2010), anthropologist Douglas E. Foley mentions that Bourdieu's ideas on symbolic violence have been used by critical race and feminist scholars to discuss the mistreatment of oppressed groups. In their work, critical race and feminist scholars have pointed out that patriarchal and racist social settings are where students from oppressed groups experience symbolic violence. In Learning Capitalist Culture (2010), Foley also mentions that many scholars in the United States have talked about Bourdieu's ideas on symbolic violence as well as the monitoring of working-class minority students. Their work focuses on the ways in which institutional control is obtained. One method is whiteness discourse.

Seth M. Holmes applies the theory of symbolic violence to the study of immigration between the United States and Mexico in Fresh Fruit, Broken Bodies (2014). In his ethnography, Holmes explains that U.S. border protection and laws aimed at cracking down on illegal immigration help perpetuate symbolic violence. Holmes also applies the lens of symbolic violence to the hierarchy between the indigenous Mexican migrant laborers and the farm supervisors in the United States. Here, Holmes indicates how because he is "light skinned" and "English speaking", he is not subjected to the derogatory name calling that the farm supervisors repeat to the Oaxacan workers.

== Domains ==
=== Social media ===
In the decades following the creation of the term symbolic violence by Pierre Bourdieu, a rapid evolution in technology resulted in the creation of various social media platforms such as Facebook, Instagram, and Twitter. The introduction of these digital communities provided an additional medium for the spread of symbolic violence through the action of "trolling" which according to Claire Hardaker is defined as "the sending or submission of provocative emails, social media posts or 'tweets', with the intention of inciting an angry or upsetting response from its intended target, or victim." While the act of trolling affects a wide range of social media users, with regard to symbolic violence it is frequently directed at women and minority groups. In many cases, victims either avoid feeding the troll by keeping silent or opting out, or actively challenging the trolls while risking a backlash. Common advice to victims like "do not feed the troll" or "ignore the troll", however, has shaped the public's expectation that in online abuse and/or trolling, victims and their supporters should conform to it as the only solution. This strategy in effect encourages victims' complicity with the symbolic violence enacted by the villain/troll, and therefore by entering into these online spaces, or ‘fields’ to use Bourdieu's term, we can argue that ‘corporeal inculcation’ of ‘symbolic violence’ is ‘exercised with the complicity’ of the individual.

=== Gender ===
Symbolic violence can be applied to the topic of the repression of women in the form of subordination. Beate Krais argued that regardless of whether within or outside the family, symbolic violence maintains a dominant relation upon women. A key aspect of the repression of women is "the social construction of women as the quintessential ‘other’” portraying female behavior as weak, female jobs as less prestigious, female activities as of less value, etc. Social reproduction is important in analyzing symbolic violence in women as the adherence to sociocultural norms by both men and women plays a key role in subordination. Symbolic violence towards women often takes the form of cultural lexical expressions. Normative phrases like, “hit like a girl” or “run like a girl” subtly develop views about the subordination of women in a linguistic form.

=== Race ===
Many studies have identified the influence of race and class on the different ways in which disciplinary action is handled by educators. In the United States there is a national rhetoric regarding the term “ghetto,” where a set of behavioral norms and traits symbolizing impoverished, crime-prone, dilapidated, and violent neighborhoods are ascribed to black people in or near urban centers.

A study led by Melanie Jones Gast, focused on 44 black students in the span of two months. Race, class, and status were combined in everyday language towards black students. With less than 10 percent of educators being black, many black students also lacked guidance from educators. Despite making up less than half the population of students, black students received more than 70 percent of all 500 disciplinary infractions.

=== Language ===
Symbolic violence can be expressed in the language domain as demonstrated by Spain's governing language institution, the Royal Spanish Academy, which is tasked with ensuring the stability of the Spanish language. The Royal Spanish Academy's policy towards Castilian ensures that it does not turn into a completely different language altogether. Also, Spaniards are generally stereotyped because of their so-called "lisp", which does not occur in any other region.

A study was done by Ana Celia Zentella that explains how the Royal Spanish Academy produces symbolic violence through their policies and actions that are designed to produce a "pure" Spanish. Zentella proposes the idea that there are many different forms of English, that sound and are spelled differently (such as English in the United Kingdom vs English in the Northeast of the United States); therefore, the Spanish language should have the same implications. This idea exemplifies symbolic violence because people are ostracized if they do not speak the form of Spanish that the academy coins "correct". Zentella explains how people would react if a person spoke with a "lisp" in the area she grew up, "if any Spaniard in our circle had ever dared to speak that way they would have been ridiculed". The main way that the Royal Spanish Academy performs symbolic violence is by normalizing the language, and expecting all speakers to conform to the normalization that they provide. Another way that Zentella relates symbolic violence to the work of the Royal Spanish Academy is through human capital. Since there is a certain expectation of how Spanish is supposed to sound in Spain, speakers from Latin American that sound different are subject to decreased human capital based on the fact that they do not sound the way they should.
