= Educational capital =

Educational capital refers to educational goods that are converted into commodities to be bought, sold, withheld, traded, consumed, and profited from in the educational system. Educational capital can be utilized to produce or reproduce inequality, and it can also serve as a leveling mechanism that fosters social justice and equal opportunity. Educational capital has been the focus of study in Economic anthropology, which provides a framework for understanding educational capital in its endeavor to understand human economic behavior using the tools of both economics and anthropology.

== Cultural capital and educational capital ==
The term educational capital is a concept that expands upon the theoretical ideas of French sociologist and anthropologist Pierre Bourdieu who applied the notion of capital to social capital, cultural capital, and symbolic capital. Pierre Bourdieu and Basil Bernstein explore how the cultural capital of the dominant classes has been viewed throughout history as the "most legitimate knowledge." How schools choose the content and organization of curriculum and instructional practices connects school knowledge (both commodified and lived) to dynamics of class, gender, and race both outside and inside our institutions of education.

Although Bourdieu went into great detail in his discourse on social, cultural and symbolic capital, he does not appear to consider the importance of educational capital as critical in and of itself. Bourdieu does however, mention academic capital in Distinction: A Social Critique of the Judgment of Taste:

Academic capital is in fact the guaranteed product of the combined effects of cultural transmission by the family and cultural transmission by the school (the efficiency of which depends on the amount of cultural capital directly inherited from the family). Through its value-inculcating and value-imposing operations, the school also helps (to a greater or lesser extent, depending on the initial disposition, i.e., class of origin) to form a general, transposable disposition towards legitimate culture, which is first acquired with respect to scholastically recognized knowledge and practices but tends to be applied beyond the bounds of the curriculum, taking the form of a 'disinterested' propensity to accumulate experience and knowledge which may not be directly profitable in the academic market(23).

Arjun Appadurai's exploration of knowledge and commodities and issues of exclusivity and authenticity is also relevant to the discussion of cultural capital and educational capital. In The Social Life of Things: Commodities in Cultural Perspective, Appadurai suggests “...commodities represent very complex social forms and distributions of knowledge.”(41)

== Economic theories and models of educational capital practices ==
=== Ritual economy in education ===
In her article "Gifting the Children: Ritual Economy of a Community School," Rhoda Halperin explores the practices of an urban community school through a ritual economy perspective. McAnany and Wells define ritual economy as "the process of provisioning and consuming that materializes and substantiates worldview for managing meaning and shaping interpretation." McAnany and Wells note that ritual and economy are linked but are not reducible to one another and suggest three critical areas of inquiry: 1) economic practice, i.e., provisioning and consuming; 2) resultant elements of practice, i.e., materialization and substantiation; and 3) the important social role of ritual practice in shading meaning and contouring the interpretation of life experiences.

Halperin calls the intersection of ritual economy and ritual kinship in the community school "gifting the children." The primary entity that is produced, acquired, and consumed is the public community charter school (a nonprofit corporation) that consists of a building and a collection of educational practices and programs. Gifting the children entails a "complex set of morally driven (and ritualized) informal, intergenerational economic practices: modeling survival strategies by combining work in the formal wage economy with informal work on odd jobs...providing actual resources such as food, sometimes housing, clothing and school supplies."(251)

=== Ritual kinship and practical kinship in education ===
Relationships similar to ritual kinship and practical kinship can play a critical role in education. Studies have shown that in many poor communities, godparents or "secular godparents" are expected to help with children's schooling. Community volunteers serve as secular godparents to help fulfill the needs of the children that parents are unable to meet: school supplies, clothing, food, as well as counseling, time, affection, trust, and "...inputs of resources for the future well-being of children and for their responsible citizenship." Halperin suggests that ritual kin "materialize things differently from other kin, biological and fictive...they are generous (often beyond their means)...and are generous with time." In the community school setting, Halperin observes many different forms of practical (fictive) kinship that are particularly ritualized (i.e., adoption, child foster care (temporary and permanent), and various other forms of nonbiological or extra-biological kinship. In The Logic of Practice, Bourdieu describes the concept of practical kinship:

The extent of practical kinship depends on the capacity of the members of the official group to overcome the tensions engendered by the conflict of interests within the common production and consumption group, and to keep up the kind of practical relationships that correspond to the official view of itself which is held by every group that sees itself as a corporate unit. On this condition, they may enjoy both the advantages accruing from every practical relationship and the symbolic profits secured by the approval socially conferred on practices conforming to the official representation of practices, that is, the social idea of kinship."(170)

=== Gift economy in education ===
In his book The Gift: The Form and Reason for Exchange in Archaic Societies, Marcel Mauss examines the nature of gift exchange and gift economy. Mauss describes a system of total services that Pacific and North American tribes participate in where economic transaction is only one component, noting that other actions take place such as "acts of politeness: banquets, rituals, military services, women, children, dances, festivals, fairs"(5) Mauss developed a theory of the three obligations: 1) obligation to reciprocate presents received; 2) obligation to give presents; and 3) obligation to receive presents. Mauss contends that "To refuse to give, to fail to invite, just as to refuse to accept, is tantamount to declaring war; it is to reject the bond of alliance and commonality."(13)

Gift economies also take place in educational settings. In some schools, the community provisions school supplies to school children through gifts, "Parents model gifting for their children who, in turn carry the practices of gifting to the next generation. We could speculate that the worsening conditions of Late Capitalism will create greater and greater demand for gifting. Unlike the gifting rituals in archaic times that were designed to strengthen elite power, the rituals in the community school serve as "...leveling mechanisms with loose expectations of reciprocity in many different forms and at much later times" (258) The only thing the community elders expect in return from the children is for them to "give back" to the community at some point in their lives. Instead of social inequality and hierarchy, the intended outcome of the gifting economy at the community school is social justice and equal opportunity.

In the school environment, gifting is also viewed as an investment strategy:

...investment in the future of children, in the community, and in a sense, in the world. If children are cultural products and if culture, in this case, working-class culture is to be reproduced and enhanced, the gifting is absolutely essential and will be perpetuated."(262)

Schools can also engage in gifting the public by providing kids a prospect for a productive life and by keeping them out of jail. Gifting also involves sacrifice by the community volunteers and founders of schools who sacrifice time, family, and health in the name of community, kids, education, and heritage preservation and conservation. Gifting the children is much more than charity in that it insures kids' abilities to give back to the community.

== Examples ==
=== Local knowledge ===
The literature in anthropology suggests that local knowledge can play a pivotal role in the success of schools by sustaining community participation in education. The main goal of community schools is to produce citizens who are skilled through curriculum in which local knowledge holds an equal place with credentialed knowledge, thus "creating a balance between school and community"(261). The Italian philosopher Antonio Gramsci believed that all people are “organic intellectuals,” in other words, being an intellectual is not just reserved for the elite or upper classes. Gramsci stressed the significance of intellectuals being part of everyday life. In Gramsci's view, intellect is not based solely on academic knowledge, “...the mode of being of the new intellectual can no longer consist in eloquence…but in active participation in practical life, as a constructor, organizer, 'permanent persuader' and not just a simple oratore…”(10). Gramsci further argues that the purpose of education should be "to create a single type of formative school (primary-secondary) which would take the child up to the threshold of his choice of job, forming him during this time as a person capable of thinking, studying and ruling - or controlling those who rule."(40) Gramsci contends that in order for schools to be successful, it is critical that students actively participate in their own learning and, in order for this to occur, the school must relate to everyday life. Halperin suggests that children can act as organic intellectuals when school administrators utilize the children's desires and personal information to impact and inform the power structure, “Anytime there was an opportunity, the kids were quoted, whether it was to woo a candidate during a job interview or to convince a member of the school board that the school was indeed necessary” (258).

Halperin connects the informal educators in the community school with Gramsci's ideas of the role of the organic intellectual, “Intersections of kin work and paid work blur distinction s between work and family in the school and in the community at large….Employing community kin, insuring job stability, and keeping the peace are also priorities. These practices are all forms of resistance to capitalism, globalization, and several forms of hegemony including, but not limited to formal school structures and conventional disciplinary practices” (252). Gramsci helps to link theory with practice, with his creation of working class intellectuals actively participating in practical life, that are assisting in developing a counter hegemony that would undermine existing social relations.

In The Essential Foucault: Selections from Essential Works of Foucault, Michel Foucault also offers alternatives for thought and new courses for active learners in education in his discussion of the reshaping of the self, “…even for the slave or for the mad, under situations where the models of selfhood are imposed from outside, a certain self-crafting is required…and each crafting of a relation with the self arises out of, and entails, a crafting of one’s relations to others – be they one’s superiors, one’s pupils, one’s colleagues…” (xxi) This idea is similar to Jean-Jacques Rousseau’s understanding of the child as an “active” learner and also Paulo Freire’s conscientization. American anthropologist Clifford Geertz also posits the importance of the local knowledge and common sense of people involved in everyday life:

To us, science, art, ideology, law, religion, technology, mathematics, even nowadays ethics and epistemology, seem genuine enough genres of cultural expression to lead us to ask (and ask, and ask) to what degree other peoples possess them, and to the degree that they do possess them what from do they take, and given the form they take what light has that to shed on our own version of them.”(92)

The preceding literature suggests that school orientations and professional development led by community leaders and residents that instruct teachers about community heritage might lead to a more successful educational experience and outcomes for children and the community. An important objective of heritage preservation is to help people in a community develop a collective identity. David Lowenthal suggests that “Remembering the past is crucial for our sense of identity…to know what we were confirms that we are” (p. 197). Good and Good argue the importance of memory, suggesting that “…ways of framing that which is hidden or left unspoken…suggest the importance of an increasing body of writing on memory, traumatic memory, and memory politics and of methods aimed at observing or retrieving remainders of violence or traumatic historical events” (2008:15). In engaging with the past it is important that we do not forget the youth in the community that are the future of the community. They are stakeholders as well as the adults, and they too need a voice. Makagon and Neuman suggest that the narrative realm can be enlarged through citizen storytellers who “…can be anyone who wants to create a documentary about historical or contemporary life…the concept is based in the idea of democratizing the means of representing interests, issues, experiences, and the concerns of people who do not have access to media but have stories they want to tell”(55). Coming to terms with the past is critical both for elders but also for youth and its impact on their evolving identity.

=== Credentialed knowledge ===
In contrast to local knowledge, "credentialed knowledge" is knowledge that is determined to be "legitimate." In other words, credentialed knowledge is that which is included to be suitable for learning in public (and private) school curricula. It is the knowledge that is sanctioned by local, state, and federal authorities. It is also the knowledge that discipline specific associations (e.g., National Council of Teachers of Mathematics; International Reading Association; Council for Exceptional Children) advocate as essential to their particular academic discipline. Curricula in K-12 schools are guided by both national and state policy-makers, including private companies who publish school textbooks, programs, and materials. Often, local knowledge as described previously is minimized or not included altogether.

== Measuring educational capital ==
In the recent age of the No Child Left Behind (NCLB) Act, educational capital at the national, state, and local levels has been measured by high-stakes testing that have determined the educational effectiveness of individual states, school districts, schools, and teachers. The learning outcomes of students have also been evaluated by these once-per-year standardized assessments, often determining whether they have attained the appropriate level of growth from one year to another. Children can be passed to the next grade level of retained based on their performance on these assessments. A growing sentiment among conservative politicians and some businesses is that the purpose of public education is to provide the private sector with individuals who are trained to perform whatever job required. To this end, an emphasis on job or career specific training has begun to permeate the rhetoric with respect to educational policy.

A recent reform in public K-12 is the public support of Charter Schools. Charter schools are supposed to be alternatives to public school such that they provide students with innovative curricula and educational experiences. Since state legislatures began passing charter legislation in the 1990s, nearly 3,000 new schools have been established. Some of these schools are funded by specific businesses, corporations, or individual benefactors that espouse particular ideals or goals for the education of children and youth. Chartering permits schools to "... run independently of the traditional public school system and tailor their programs to community needs." Even though all charter schools are not exceptionally innovative and some schools operate similarly to traditional public schools, policymakers, parents, and educators are looking at chartering as a way to increase educational choice and innovation within the public school system.

== Bibliography ==
- Appadurai, Arjun (1986) Commodities and the Politics of Value. In The Social Life of Things: Commodities in Cultural Perspective, edited by A. Appadurai, pp. 3–63. Cambridge University press, Cambridge, UK.
- Apple, Michael W. (1989) Teachers and Texts: A Political Economy of Class and Gender Relations in Education. New York: Routledge.
- Bourdieu, Pierre (1984) Distinction: A Social Critique of the Judgement of Taste. Translated by Richard Nice. Cambridge, Massachusetts: Harvard University Press.
- Bourdieu, Pierre (1986) The Forms of Capital. In J. Richardson (Ed.) Handbook of Theory and Research for the Sociology of Education (New York, Greenwood), 241-258.
- Bourdieu, Pierre (1980) The Logic of Practice. Stanford: Stanford University Press.
- Bourdieu, Pierre and Jean-Claude Passerson (1977) Reproduction in Education, Society and Culture, (Beverly Hills: Sage), and Basil Bernstein, Class, Codes and Control, Vol. 3 (Boston and London: Routledge & Kegan Paul)
- Freire, Paulo (200) Pedagogy of the Oppressed. New York: Continuum.
- Geertz, Clifford (1983) Common sense as cultural system. In: C. Geertz (Ed.), Local knowledge (pp. 73–93). New York: Basic Books.
- Good, Byron and Mary-Jo Del-Vecchio Good (2008) Postcolonial Disorders: Reflections on subjectivity in the Contemporary World, In Postcolonial Disorders. Mary-Jo DelVecchio Good, Sandra T. Hyde, sarah Pinto and Byron J. Good, eds. pp. 1–41. U California Press.
- Gramsci, Antonio (1971) Selections from the Prison Notebooks of Antonio Gramsci. Translated and edited by Quintin Hoare and Geoffrey Nowell Smith. New York: International Publishers.
- Halperin, Rhoda H. (2008) Gifting the Children: Ritual Economy of a Community School. In Dimensions of Ritual Economy, Research in Economic Anthropology, 27(249-266). Emerald Group Publishing Limited.
- Halperin, Rhoda H. (1994) Economy and Ecology: Basic Concepts, Their History, and Applications. In Cultural Economies, Past and Present, by R. H. Halperin, pp. 55–84. University of Texas Press, Austin.
- Halperin, Rhoda H.(1998) Practicing Community: Class Culture and Power in an Urban Neighborhood.University of Texas Press, Austin.
- Kemper, R.V. (1982) The compadrazgo in urban Mexico. Anthropological Quarterly, 55, 17-30.
- Lowenthal, David (1985) The Past is a Foreign Country. Cambridge: Cambridge University Press.
- Makagon and Neuman (2009) Recording Culture: Audio documentary and the ethnographic experience. Thousand Oaks, CA: SAGE Publications, Inc.
- Mauss, Marcel (1990) The Gift: The Form and Reason for Exchange in Archaic Societies, New York, W.W. Norton & Company, Inc.
- McAnany, Patricia A., and E. Christian Wells (2008) Towards a Theory of Ritual Economy. In Dimensions of Ritual Economy, edited by E.C. Wells and P.A. McAnany, pp. 1–16. Emerald Group Publishing Limited, Bingley, UK.
- Mintz, S.W., & Wolf, E.R. (1950). An analysis of ritual co-parenthood (compadrazgo). Southwestern Journal of Anthropology, 6, 341-355.
- Nutini, H.G. (1984). Ritual kinship: Ideological and structural integration of the compadrazgo system in rural Tlaxcala, Volume 2. Princeton, NJ: Princeton University Press.
- Nutini, H.G., & Bell, B. (1980). Ritual kinship: The structure and historical development of the compadrazgo system in rural Tlaxcala, Volume 1. Princeton, New Jersey: Princeton University Press.
- Rabinow, Paul and Nikolas, Rose (2003) Foucault Today, In the Essential Foucault: Selections from Essential Works of Foucault, 1954-1984. Paul Rabinow and Nikolas Rose, eds. Pp. vii-xxxv.
- Rousseau, Jean-Jacques (1979) Emile, or On Education, trans. with an introd. by Allan Bloom, New York: Basic Books.
- US Charter Schools Website (2010) https://web.archive.org/web/20100425064942/http://www.uscharterschools.org/pub/uscs_docs/o/movement.htm
