= Transhistoricity =

Transcending historical boundaries

Transhistoricity is the quality of holding throughout human history, not merely within the frame of reference of a particular form of society at a particular stage of historical development. An entity or concept that has transhistoricity is said to be transhistorical.

Certain theories of history (e.g. that of Hegel), treat human history as divided into distinct epochs with their own internal logics—historical materialism is the most famous case of such a theory. States of affairs which hold within one epoch may be completely absent, or carry opposite implications in another, according to these theories.

== In the abstract ==
Transhistoricity may be seen as the necessary antithesis to the idea that meanings are bounded by their historical context. It is the temporal equivalent of the spatial concept of universality.

== In sociopolitical theory ==
Questions of what might and might not be transhistorical phenomena are typically the concern of historians and sociologists identifying with the historicist traditions of Hegelian or Marxian thought, but matter additionally in the debates around Kuhn's notion of paradigm shift.

Fredric Jameson, a Marxist literary theorist, asserted that theory must "Always historicize!", going on to observe that this order was itself a "transhistorical imperative".

Others look for transhistorical continuities to inform what's basic to the human condition. For example, D. K. Simonton, finds some regularities in the types of ideas that gain ascendancy following certain types of historical events, in a data series spanning 2,500 years.

In more recent years, research in the vicinity of evolutionary psychology has proceeded on the basis that some observed transcultural regularities in human behaviour are also transhistoric, accounted for by their being fixed in the genetic legacy common to all Homo sapiens.

== In aesthetics ==
Part of the debate over the distinction between high art and folk art (or lesser disciplines) hinges on the question of whether art can (and if so, if it should) aspire to transcend the particular frame of reference within which it was produced. This frame may be taken to be historically delimited.

== See also ==
- Critique of political economy
- Whig history
