= Legitimation =

Process by which something becomes accepted within a society

Legitimation, legitimization (US), or legitimisation (UK) is the act of providing or creating legitimacy. Legitimation in the social sciences refers to the process whereby an act, process, or ideology becomes legitimate by its attachment to norms and values within a given society. It is the process of making something acceptable and normative to a group or audience.

Legitimate power is the right to exercise control over others by virtue of the authority of one's superior organisational position or status.

== Power and influence ==
The legitimation of power can be understood using Max Weber's traditional bases of power. In a bureaucracy, individuals gain legitimate power through positions that are widely recognized as granting authority. There is no inherent right to wield power. For example, a president can exercise power and authority because the position is fully legitimated by society as a whole.

In another example, if an individual attempts to convince others that something is "right," they can invoke generally accepted arguments that support their agenda. Advocacy groups must legitimate their courses of action based on invoking specific social norms and values. Invoking these norms and values allows the group to proceed in a rational and coherent manner with the expectation that their subsequent behavior is legitimated by the norms and values which guide their organizations.

== Audience-based view ==
Sociologists and organizational ecologists have shown that legitimation originates from consensus among certain agents (an audience) on which features and behaviors of an actor (a candidate) should be viewed as appropriate and desirable within a widespread system of social codes. An audience-based theory of legitimation posits that various social audiences develop expectations about what organizations can or should do and accordingly evaluate organizational action. Candidate organizations that pass the code test are legitimated in the social environment. One of the consequences is that they enjoy greater survival.

Early elaborations of this idea include attempts to understand the variations of codes across different audiences; the impact of code violation on organizational performance; the role of the network connecting social actors and their audiences in shaping the formation and operation of social codes.

== Family law ==
Legitimation can also be used as a legal term where a father of a child born out of wedlock becomes the child's legal father. Prior to legitimation, the child is said to be illegitimate. Legitimated children are entitled to such benefits as ordained by law as they would if that man had been married to the child's mother at the time of the child's birth. (Some benefits are still withheld under various systems, such as the British peerage.) The father is responsible for providing support to the child and the child is entitled to inherit from the father.

While legitimation can be as simple as a statement by the father, in some jurisdictions the father must officially recognise the child. This option is typically also available to non-biological fathers ("social fathers").

== Canon law ==
Legitimation is a term in Roman Catholic canon law to remove the canonical irregularity of illegitimacy for candidates for the priesthood.

== See also ==
- Delegitimization
- Legitimacy (political)
- Legitimation crisis
- Machiavellianism
- Rationalization (psychology)
- Structural abuse
- Symbolic violence
