= Field theory (sociology) =

Concept in sociology

In sociology, field theory examines how individuals construct social fields and how they are affected by such fields. Social fields are environments in which competition between individuals and between groups takes place, such as markets, academic disciplines, musical genres, etc.

Fields feature different positions that social actors can occupy. The dominant players in the field, called the incumbents, are generally invested in maintaining the field in its current form, as changes to the rules of competition risk destabilizing their dominant positions. Fields may also feature insurgents who instead aim to alter the field so they can successfully compete with the incumbents. Dramatic change in previously stable fields can come from either successful insurgents or intrusion from other fields, or from government-imposed rule change.

In general, different field positions create different incentives. Field position is experienced by individuals in the form of motivation. The acknowledgement of the stakes of the field and the acquiring of interests and investments prescribed by the field is termed social illusion, or illusio.

Unstable fields are defined by rapid change and frequently by destructive forms of competition, such as pure competition over prices that drives profit margins to untenably low levels. Fields thus need to be stabilized with rules that ensure competition takes non-destructive forms. Stable fields rarely emerge on their own, but must be constructed by skilled entrepreneurs. The government frequently plays a role in this process as well.

== Bourdieu's formulation of fields ==
The field (French: champ) is one of the core concepts used by French social scientist Pierre Bourdieu. In his formulation, a field is a setting in which agents and their social positions are located. The position of each particular agent in the field is a result of interaction between the specific rules of the field, the agent's habitus, and the agent's capital (social, economic and cultural). Fields interact with each other, and are hierarchical; most are subordinate to the larger field of power and class relations.

Instead of confining his analysis of social relations and change to voluntaristic agency or to the structural concept of class, Bourdieu uses the agency-structure bridging concept of field: a historical, non-homogeneous social-spatial arena in which people maneuver and struggle in pursuit of desirable resources. Much of Bourdieu's work observes the semi-independent role of educational and cultural resources in the expression of agency. This makes his work amenable to liberal-conservative scholarship positing the fundamental cleavages of society to be among disorderly factions of the working class, in need of disciplinary intervention where they have assumed excessive privilege. Given his historical and biographical location, however, Bourdieu was in practice both influenced by and sympathetic to the Marxist identification of economic command as a principal component of power and agency within capitalist society, in contrast to some of his followers or the influential sociologist Max Weber.

=== Social system ===
In Bourdieu's work, a field is a system of social positions (for example, a profession such as law) structured internally in terms of power relationships (such as the power differential between judges and lawyers). More specifically, a field is a social arena of struggle over the appropriation of certain species of capital — capital being whatever is taken as significant for social agents (the most obvious example being monetary capital). Fields are organized both vertically and horizontally. This means that fields are not strictly analogous to classes and are often autonomous, independent spaces of social play. The field of power is peculiar in that it exists "horizontally" through all of the fields, and the struggles within it control the "exchange rate" of the forms of cultural, symbolic, or physical capital between the fields themselves. A field is constituted by the relational differences in positions of social agents, and the boundaries of a field are demarcated by where its effects end. Different fields can be either autonomous or interrelated (for example, consider the separation of power between the judiciary and the legislature). More complex societies have more fields and more relations between fields.

According to these rules, activity develops in the field, which works like a market in which actors compete for the specific benefits associated with it. This competition defines the objective relationships between participants through factors such as the volume of capital they contribute, their trajectories within the field, or their ability to adjust to the rules inherent to the field. The extent to which participants are able to make effective use of the resources with which they are endowed with is a function of the adaptation of their habitus in this specific field. The habitus is the subjective system of expectations and predispositions acquired through past experience.

The operative capital in each field is the set of resources which can be used to obtain an advantage within it. Therefore, capital is a factor of the field dynamics as well as a by-product of the field that does not exist outside of it. Different species of capital perform in different fields, which are in turn defined by the power balances exerted by the capital.

=== Construction ===
Fields are constructed according to underlying nomoi, fundamental principles of "vision and division" (for example, the division between mind and body or male and female), or organizing "laws" of experience that govern practices and experiences within a field. The nomos underlying one field is often irreducible to that underlying another, as in the noted disparity between the nomos of the aesthetic field that values cultural capital and in some sense discourages economic capital, and that of the economic field which values economic capital. Agents subscribe to a particular field not by way of explicit contract, but by their practical acknowledgement of the stakes, implicit in the very "playing of the game."

This acknowledgement of the stakes of the field and the acquiring of interests and investments prescribed by the field is termed "social illusion" or "illusio".

== See also ==
- Sexual field
- Tacit knowledge
- Knowledge management
- Focal point (game theory)

== Bibliography ==
- Bourdieu, Pierre (1993). The Field of Cultural Production. Cambridge, UK: Polity Press.
- Hilgers, Mathieu, Mangez Eric (2014). Bourdieu's Theory of Social Fields: Concepts and Applications. London: Routledge.
