= Symbolic capital =

Symbol and its capital

In sociology and anthropology, symbolic capital can be referred to as the resources available to an individual on the basis of honor, prestige or recognition, and serves as value that one holds within a culture. A war hero, for example, may have symbolic capital in the context of running for political office. Theorists have argued that symbolic capital accumulates primarily from the fulfillment of social obligations that are themselves embedded with potential for prestige. Much as with the accumulation of financial capital, symbolic capital is 'rational' in that it can be freely converted into leveraging advantage within social and political spheres. Yet unlike financial capital, symbolic capital is not boundless, and its value may be limited or magnified by the historical context in which it was accumulated. Symbolic capital must be identified within the cultural and historical frame through which it originated in order to fully explain its influence across cultures.

Objects, as abstract representations of their environments, may also possess symbolic capital. This capital may be embedded in the built environment, or urban form of a city, as a symbolic representation of that land's cultural value. For example, landmarks usually have symbolic value and utility. They become landmarks precisely because they have symbolic value. This reciprocal relationship provides the landmark with cultural or environmental meaning, while at the same time lending its environment a layer of prestige.

== History ==
The concept of symbolic capital is grounded in the theory of conspicuous consumption, first introduced and expounded in late-19th century works by Thorstein Veblen and Marcel Mauss. Veblen argued that the nouveau riche utilized lavish displays of wealth to symbolize their entrance into a previously-insulated upper class, embodying objects with meaning that existed only to magnify and confirm their newfound class and status. Mauss subsequently expanded on this argument, suggesting that social competitions for prestige favored those who spent recklessly and forced others into "the shadow of his name". Mauss' theory marked a departure from Veblen's in that he did not seek to frame the individual actor's actions within a cultural context; instead, his theory focused on the overarching structural implementation of status boundaries. Both of these conceptualizations, in turn, provided groundwork for Pierre Bourdieu's unifying theory of symbolic capital.

The explicit concept of symbolic capital was coined by Bourdieu, and is expanded upon in his books Distinction and, later, in Practical Reason: On the Theory of Action. Along with theories forwarded by Veblen and Mauss, symbolic capital is an extension of Max Weber's analysis of status. Bourdieu argues that symbolic capital gains value at the cross-section of class and status, where one must not only possess but be able to appropriate objects with a perceived or concrete sense of value.

== Distinction from social capital ==
Pierre Bourdieu explains social capital as the degree to which actors are capable of subsisting together in social structures that are often heterogeneous in nature. Where symbolic capital is earned on an individual basis and may fluctuate widely between members in a community, social capital is the overarching sense of trust and cooperation that actors in an environment possess in between one another. An actor may possess a great degree of symbolic capital while isolating themselves from the community, resulting in a low level of social capital, or vice versa.

The term social capital was first defined by Jane Jacobs in order to explain the inherent value formed in neighborhood relationships which allowed members to cooperate and establish a communal sense of trust. The concept itself, however, was originally articulated by L. J. Hanifan in a 1916 journal article, "The Rural School Community Center", in the Annals of the American Academy of Political and Social Science. He included a chapter on the subject in his 1920 book, The Community Center. The term was later used by Jacobs in her influential writing on urban planning, The Death and Life of Great American Cities.

== Examples ==
What follows is a non-exhaustive list of what may constitute symbolic capital.

- A county commission may recruit local neighborhood leaders to help with zoning laws based on those individuals' prior accomplishments in improving infrastructure or bridging ties at the community level.
- Activists may hold more leverage in social or political arenas based on their prior experiences (see: combat veterans protesting war, former police chiefs protesting brutality, and so on).
- Financing or supporting a nation's war efforts may award an individual with symbolic capital should that effort also be accepted by the citizens within the culture.
- Olympic medalists often serve as embodiments of a nation's prestige.

== See also ==
- Symbolic power
