= Social dynamics =

Study of behavior of groups

Social dynamics (or sociodynamics) is the study of the behavior of groups and of the interactions of individual group members, aiming to understand the emergence of complex social behaviors among microorganisms, plants and animals, including humans. It is related to sociobiology but also draws from physics and complex system sciences. In the last century, sociodynamics was viewed as part of psychology. In the 1990s, social dynamics began being viewed as a separate scientific discipline. Then, starting in the 2000s, sociodynamics took off as a discipline of its own, many papers were released in the field in this decade.

== Overview ==
The field of social dynamics brings together ideas from economics, sociology, social psychology, and other disciplines, and is a sub-field of complex adaptive systems or complexity science. The fundamental assumption of the field is that individuals are influenced by one another's behavior. The field is closely related to system dynamics. Like system dynamics, social dynamics is concerned with changes over time and emphasizes the role of feedbacks. However, in social dynamics individual choices and interactions are typically viewed as the source of aggregate level behavior, while system dynamics posits that the structure of feedbacks and accumulations are responsible for system level dynamics. Research in the field typically takes a behavioral approach, assuming that individuals are boundedly rational and act on local information. Mathematical and computational modeling are important tools for studying social dynamics. This field grew out of work done in the 1940s by game theorists such as Duncan & Luce, and even earlier works by mathematician Armand Borel. Because social dynamics focuses on individual level behavior, and recognizes the importance of heterogeneity across individuals, strict analytic results are often impossible. Instead, approximation techniques, such as mean-field approximations from statistical physics, or computer simulations are used to understand the behaviors of the system. In contrast to more traditional approaches in economics, scholars of social dynamics are often interested in non-equilibrium, or dynamic, behavior. That is, behavior that changes over time.

== Topics ==
- Social networks
- Diffusion of technologies and information
- Cooperation
- Social norms

== See also ==
- Complex adaptive system
- Complexity science
- Collective intelligence
- Dynamical systems
- Jay Wright Forrester
- Group dynamics
- Operations research
- Population dynamics
- System dynamics
- Social psychology
- Societal collapse
- Sociobiology
- Sociocultural evolution
