= Highbrow =

Word synonymous with intellectual

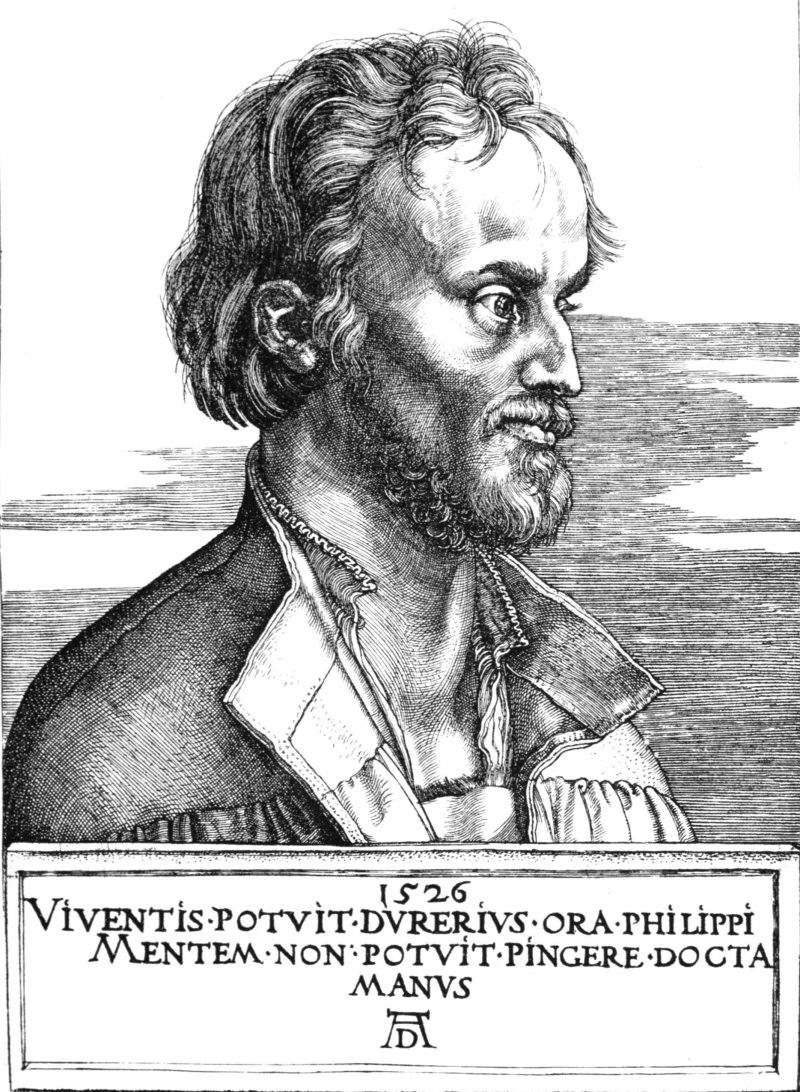
Philip Melanchthon, engraving by Albrecht Dürer, 1526

Used colloquially as a noun or adjective, "highbrow" is synonymous with intellectual; as an adjective, it also means elite, and generally carries a connotation of high culture. The term, first recorded in 1875, draws its metonymy from the pseudoscience of phrenology, which claims people with large foreheads are more intelligent.

== Applications ==
"Highbrow" can be applied to music, implying most of the classical music tradition; to literature—i.e., literary fiction and poetry; to films in the arthouse line; and to comedy that requires significant understanding of analogies or references to appreciate. The term highbrow is considered by some (with corresponding labels as 'middlebrow' 'lowbrow') as discerning or selective; and highbrow is currently distanced from the writer by quotation marks: "We thus focus on the consumption of two generally recognised 'highbrow' genres—opera and classical". The first usage in print of highbrow was recorded in 1884. The term was popularized in 1902 by Will Irvin, a reporter for The Sun of New York City, who adhered to the phrenological notion of more intelligent people having high foreheads.

== Variants ==
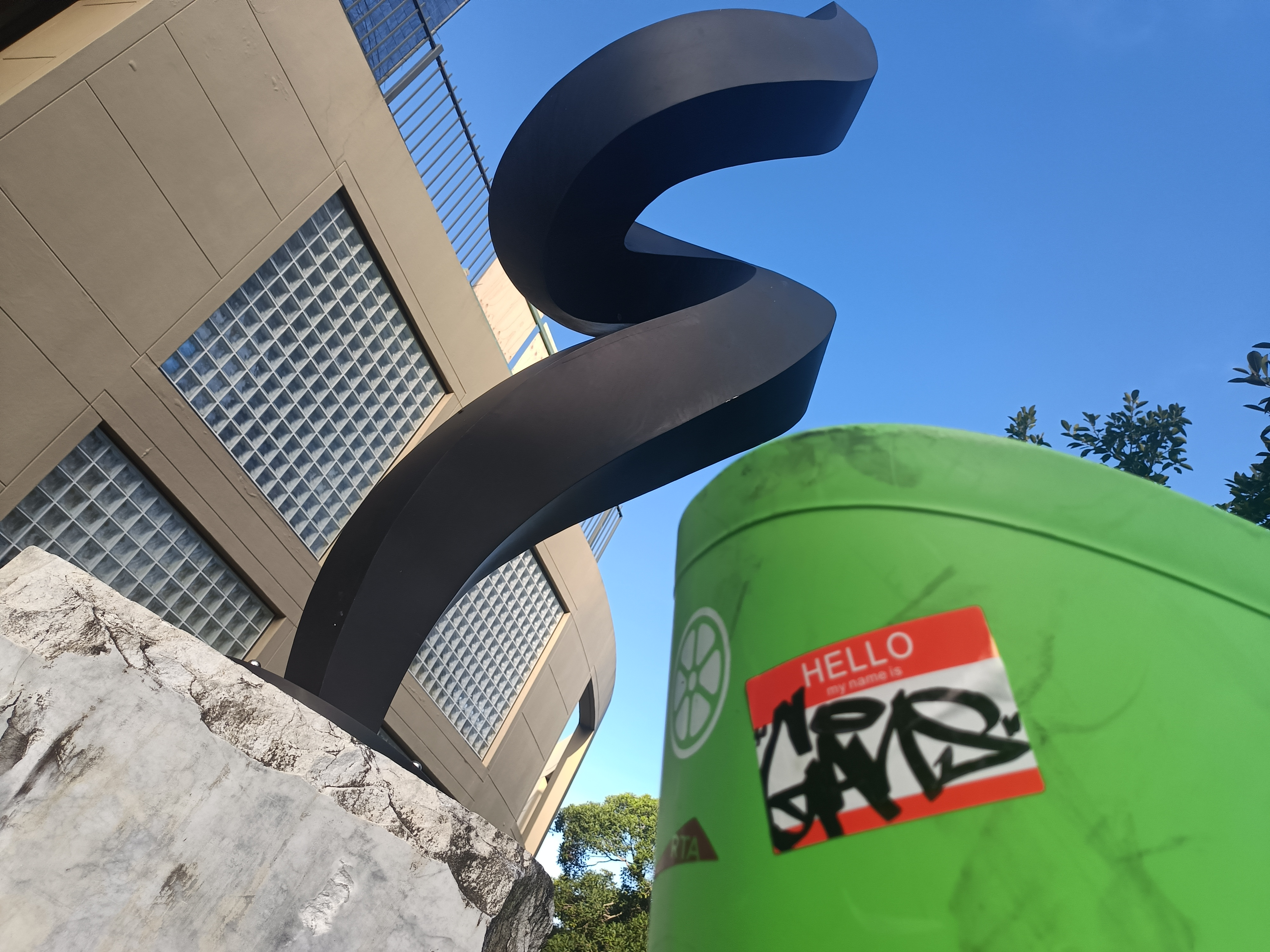
On the left a sculpture and on the right a name tag sticker with a graffiti tag. Sydney. 2025

Lowbrow is the opposite of highbrow, and between those brows is the middlebrow, which term describes the mediocre culture that has neither high expectations nor low expectations as culture. Usage of the term middlebrow is derogatory, as in Virginia Woolf's unsent letter to the New Statesman, written in the 1930s and published in The Death of the Moth and Other Essays (1942). According to the Oxford English Dictionary, the word middlebrow first appeared in print in 1925, in Punch: "The BBC claims to have discovered a new type—'the middlebrow'. It consists of people who are hoping that some day they will get used to the stuff that they ought to like". The term had previously appeared in hyphenated form in The Nation, on 25 January 1912:

[T]here is an alarmingly wide chasm, I might almost say a vacuum, between the high-brow, who considers reading either as a trade or as a form of intellectual wrestling, and the low-brow, who is merely seeking for gross thrills. It is to be hoped that culture will soon be democratized through some less conventional system of education, giving rise to a new type that might be called the middle-brow, who will consider books as a source of intellectual enjoyment.

In spite of their wide-reaching differences, Virginia Woolf describes the highbrow as intimately reliant on the lowbrow. For instance, she considers Prince Hamlet to be a highbrow lacking orientation in the world once he had lost the lowbrow Ophelia with her grip on earthly realities: this, she thought, explained why in general highbrows "honour so wholeheartedly and depend so completely upon those who are called lowbrows".

It was popularized by the American writer and poet Margaret Widdemer, whose essay "Message and Middlebrow" appeared in the Review of Literature in 1933. The three genres of fiction, as American readers approached them in the 1950s and as obscenity law differentially judged them, are the subject of Ruth Pirsig Wood, Lolita in Peyton Place: Highbrow, Middlebrow, and Lowbrow Novels, 1995.

== See also ==
- Ballet
- Bildung
- Classics
- Cultural capital
- General knowledge
- Pastiche
- Socialite
- Status–income disequilibrium
- Achieved status
- Bildungsbürgertum
- Egghead
- Bluestocking
- Low culture
