= Peter Richards (disambiguation) =

Peter Richards (born 1978) is a former English rugby union player.

Peter or Pete Richards may also refer to:

- Peter Richards (artist) (born 1970), artist & curator, Belfast
- Peter Richards, a supporting character from Dallas, played by Christopher Atkins
- Peter Richards (Royal Navy officer) (1787–1869), British Royal Navy admiral and Third Naval Lord
- Peter Richards (physician) (1936–2011), professor of medicine and president of Hughes Hall, Cambridge
- Peter Felix Richards (1808–1868), pioneer Scottish merchant in post-Treaty of Nanjing Shanghai
- Pete Richards (American football) (1905–1989), American football player

== See also ==
- Peter Richards Islands, Nunavut, Canada
- Richard Peters (disambiguation)
