= Admiralty Inlet (Nunavut) =

Inlet of Baffin Island in Nunavut, Canada

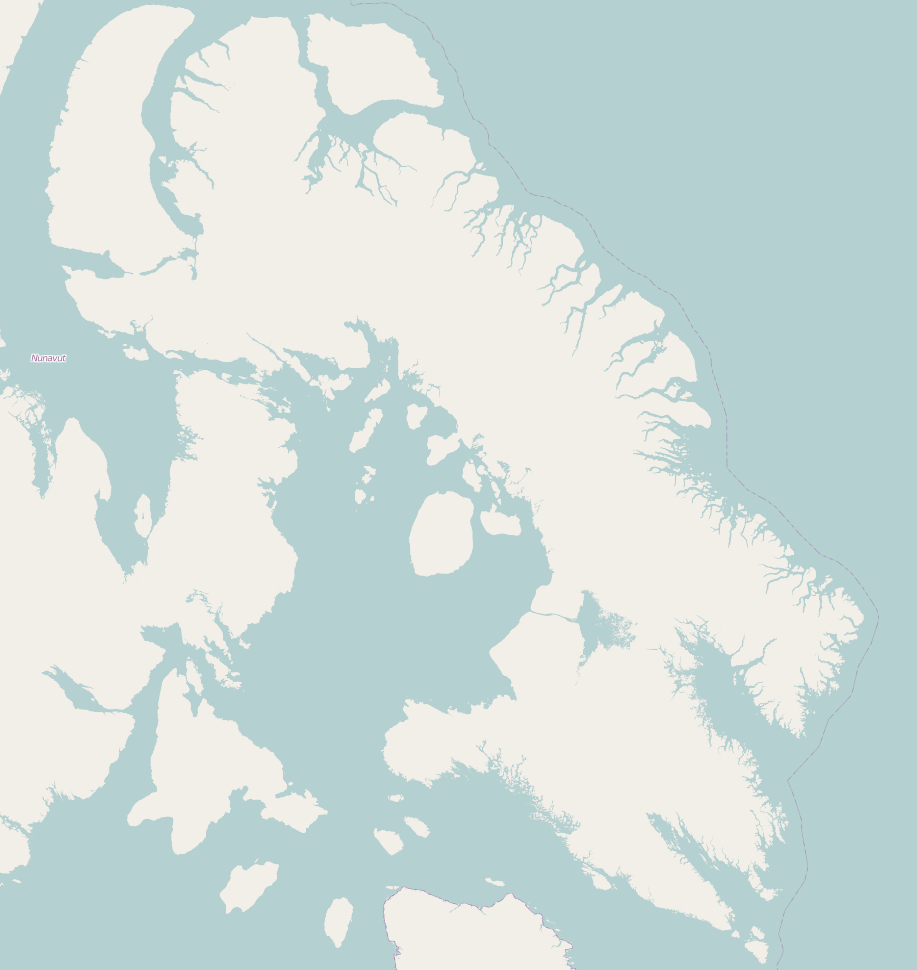
- Location in Nunavut Admiralty Inlet (Nunavut) Admiralty Inlet (Canada)
- Location: Qikiqtaaluk Region, Nunavut
- Coordinates: 72°30′00″N 86°00′00″W
- Type: Bay
- Primary outflows: Lancaster Sound
- Ocean/sea sources: Arctic Ocean
- Basin countries: Canada
- Islands: Peter Richards Islands; Saneruarsuk Islands; Yeoman Island
- Settlements: Arctic Bay

Admiralty Inlet is a bay in the Qikiqtaaluk Region of Nunavut, Canada. It extends southerly from Lancaster Sound along the western shore of Baffin Island's Borden Peninsula. Its only permanent settlement is the hamlet of Arctic Bay, which is located on Uluksan Peninsula, a landform that juts into Admiralty Inlet south of Sirmilik National Park.

Several waterways extend from it, including Elwin Inlet, Baillarge Bay, Strathcona Sound, Victor Bay, Adams Sound, Levasseur Inlet, and Moffet Inlet, before it ends at Jungersen Bay. There are many islands within Admiralty Inlet, including the Peter Richards Islands, Yeoman Island and the Saneruarsuk Islands.

Admiralty Inlet sustains a large population of narwhals. caribou, polar bears, and walrus frequent the area.

== History ==
Admiralty Inlet was first charted by Admiral Sir Edward Parry in 1820.
