= Bildungsbürgertum =

Social class that emerged in mid-18th-century Germany

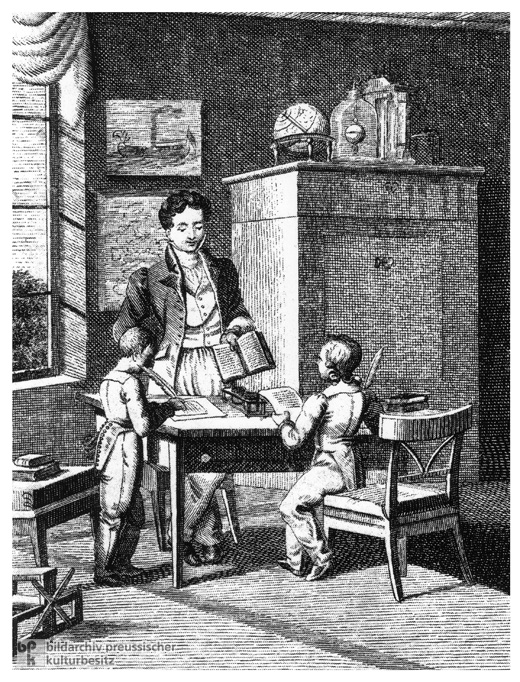
The Bildungsbürger class defined itself more on the basis of education than material possessions and thus great emphasis was laid upon the education of children.

Bildungsbürgertum (German: [ˈbɪldʊŋsˌbʏʁɡɐtuːm], "cultured / educated middle class") was a social class that emerged in mid-18th-century Germany and Austria as the educated social stratum of the bourgeoisie. It was a cultural elite that had received an education based on the values of idealism and classical studies and which steered public opinion in art and patterns of behaviour. The majority of its members were Protestant and employed in the upper civil service and free professions such as law, journalism and the arts. Despite its influence, the Bildungsbürgertum never exceeded more than about one percent of the population.

Wilhelm von Humboldt shaped the Bildungsbürgertum's ideal of education as a process of life-long learning that valued all-around knowledge over training for a profession. During the course of the nineteenth century, that ideal was slowly diluted as industrialisation and urbanisation increased the need for specialised scientific knowledge. "Secular religions" such as nationalism, social Darwinism, antisemitism and ideological imperialism became more prominent, and the class came to see its status more and more as an entitlement rather than an achievement.

The slaughter of World War I shattered the Bildungsbürgertum's worldview. It suffered high losses in the fighting and a significant reduction of both income and status. Many of its members saw democracy as a threat and supported a return to authoritarian rule. Under the Nazi regime, however, what remained of the Bildungsbürgertum's influence faded to insignificance.

== Term ==
The term Bildungsbürgertum was coined in 1920s Germany, by the political right wing to communicate anti-bourgeois sentiment based upon the perceived incompatibility of temperament in a person who claims to being both a 'genuine' intellectual and a Bürger, a bourgeois.

In the German compound word Bildungsbürgertum, the word Bildung denotes "culture" and "education" as defined during the Age of Enlightenment. Bildung also corresponds to the educational ideal presented in the works of Wilhelm von Humboldt in which Bildung connotes education as a life-long process, not merely the acquisition of knowledge and training.

The term Bildungsbürgertum was coined in the 1920s to distinguish the older class educated in the humanist tradition from the university-educated scientists and engineers who had come to be recognized as a new academic elite and were looked down on by the Bildungsbürgertum because of their lack of general knowledge.

== Characteristics ==
According to Klaus Vondung, a scholar in cultural and German studies, the Bildungsbürgertum of the 19th century had seven key characteristics.

1. Its members had an academic education in the humanistic (classical) tradition and were bound together by high-level professions which were largely reserved to them. The highest professional group included the upper civil service – university professors, teachers in academically oriented secondary schools (gymnasiums), judges and upper administrative officials – plus the partly nationalised Protestant clergy. A somewhat lower second group was made up of the academic free professions such as attorneys, writers, artists, journalists and editors.
2. There was a high level of self-recruitment among the Bildungsbürgertum. Upper civil servants especially tended to come from families already in the educated elite, although there was also a flow into the Bildungsbürgertum from the merchant class and the parts of the middle class whose roots predated industrialisation (the "old middle class").
3. Most members shared similar backgrounds, educational paths and institutional memberships (such as the reserve officer corps) that shaped their mentalities and social conduct and led to "in-group" behaviour in social interactions.
4. Social prestige was more important to them than economic prosperity.
5. Its ranks were predominantly Protestant. Catholics were represented at a level considerably below their numbers in the general population.
6. The Bildungsbürgertum was considered a cultural elite: "Its members' interpretations of reality and concepts of order, which extend from positive and formal systems – such as in law – to artistic readings of reality, constitute 'public' culture. ... The representative worth of the culture can be asserted because public opinion for the most part is made by the Bildungsbürgertum."
7. Its members occupied the professions that passed on the concepts of order which the Bildungsbürgertum developed and thereby allowed those professions to become socially dominant.

The social relevance of the Bildungsbürgertum as elite interpreters of cultural phenomena was largely based on its dominant position in universities and schools and in the production and dissemination of public opinion through the press and literature. In the process it built up educational and linguistic barriers that allowed it to become an elite class to which the uneducated had little access. Pierre Bourdieu's concept of cultural capital, developed in the 20th century, is partly based on the Bildungsbürgertum's social sphere.

== Culture ==
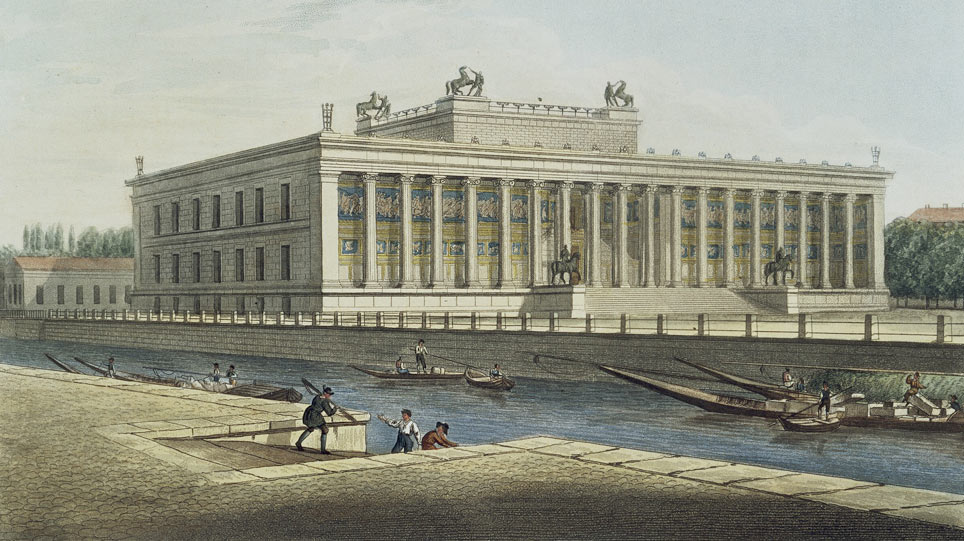
The Altes Museum on Berlin's Museum Island, 1830

The defining characteristic of the Bildungsbürgertum, including how it perceived itself, was its engagement with culture. Its education was based on specific canons that were both shaped and embraced by the Bildungsbürgertum. Social interaction in theatres, opera houses, concert halls, and museums in large cities became a defining characteristic of their milieu. The institutions often owe their founding and financial support to the patronage of the Bildungsbürgertum. They campaigned for the construction of cultural buildings, which – often designed in a classical, temple-like style – became extended public salons of social and political life, such as Museum Island in Berlin (1830), the Vienna State Opera (1869) and the Städel in Frankfurt am Main (1833). In smaller regional centres, too, private and municipal theatres were established, with orchestras that brought opera and concert performances to the provinces.

Under the aegis of the Bildungsbürgertum, the arts pages of the major German-language newspapers took on an important role, placing the examination of culture on the same level as that of politics and economics. The feature pages of the Neue Freie Presse in Vienna achieved particular renown. Through the collaboration of Theodor Herzl, Hugo von Hofmannsthal, Felix Salten, Arthur Schnitzler, Bertha von Suttner and Stefan Zweig, they elevated the broader treatment of culture to a pillar of reputable media reporting. The Frankfurter Zeitung, the Berlin Vossische Zeitung and the Prague Tagblatt played a similar role.

== History ==
=== England and France ===
The development of the German bourgeoisie took place later than in England and France. The bourgeoisie in those countries had achieved a share of economic and political power considerably earlier. In England the process began in the late Middle Ages with the increasingly powerful House of Commons in which both the urban, bourgeois and mercantile elites (as well as religious minorities) and the rural, conservative (and Anglican) gentry were represented. In France the rise of the bourgeoisie was hampered by the Huguenot Wars and the subsequent absolutism. In the 18th century, with the Régence (1715–1723), merchants, private bankers and industrialists began to set the tone. As a result of the French Revolution of 1789 and definitively under Louis Philippe, they came to control the levers of political power.

What had been occurring since the late Middle Ages in many European city-states – such as the free imperial cities, the Hanseatic cities, Florence, the Republic of Venice, the Dutch Republic and the Swiss city cantons – was repeated at the national level: the emergence of bourgeois patrician families of commercial character. By the 19th century, most such patricians had long since become aristocrats. By the 17th century, a class of "grand burghers" had also emerged, particularly in the Hanseatic cities. Unlike the older patricians, they no longer aspired primarily to nobility by acquiring rural estates but emphasised bourgeois values such as achievement in commerce or science and a certain modesty in the display of wealth. From the end of the 18th century onwards, during the course of revolutions and industrialisation, the older bourgeois ruling classes were often replaced by new economic elites in their local spheres of influence.

The distinction between the French terms citoyen (roughly: citizen, member of the educated classes) and bourgeois (roughly: propertied citizen, member of the ruling class) is significant. In contrast to the typical propertied bourgeois, the educated bourgeois thought not only of himself and money, although an above-average income or wealth was usually assumed. Capital was understood to mean the possession of knowledge, relationships and connections, which they saw as a more original and significant capital asset than money. In France there was no parallel to the concept of the Bildungsbürgertum; instead, a distinction is usually made between the bourgeoisie and intellectuals, among whom social origin was less important than career choices and the type of political or social engagement.

=== 18th century ===
Although universities had existed in Europe since the early Middle Ages, the social importance of the academy grew in the wake of industrialisation when it became essential to draw on scientifically well-trained citizens for economic growth and for the new western state structure. From the 19th century onwards, new universities sprang up all over Europe, as for example the present-day Humboldt University in Berlin (1810), as well as technically specialized universities such as the Federal Institute of Technology Zurich (1855). Members of families in the Bildungsbürgertum often gained privileged access to secondary schools (gymnasiums) and universities.

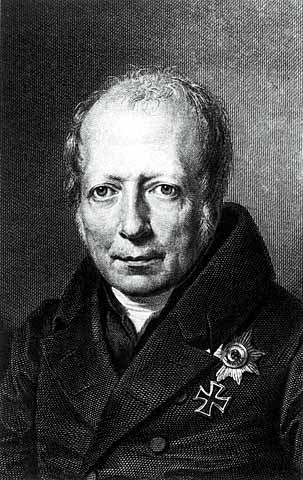
Wilhelm von Humboldt, whose educational ideal was embraced by the Bildungsbürgertum

At the beginning of the 19th century, Wilhelm von Humboldt, with his model of an ideal education, created the most important intellectual product of the Bildungsbürgertum, one which at the same time became its objective. It was built around the two central concepts of bourgeois enlightenment: the autonomous individual and world citizenship (Weltbürgertum). The university was to be a place where autonomous individuals and “world citizens” were formed or self-created. University education was not to be job-related but rather an education independent of economic interests. Humboldt's ideal pointed to a “human society of equals” which ran counter to the efforts of many members of the Bildungsbürgertum to set themselves apart.

By the end of the 18th century, new humanism had penetrated deeply into the Bildungsbürgertum, supported by the spiritual atmosphere in the family and by formal education. The emerging class, particularly in the professional civil service, was fostered by the late absolutist administrative state. It needed a large number of well-trained civil servants which the pre-modern class order was unable to produce. The Bildungsbürgertum was able to assert its standards of achievement, often against the resistance of the nobility, and as academically trained civil servants to shape and execute national policy. The growing complexity of society in the era of industrialisation and rapid urban growth also led to the need for experts in such fields as engineering, law and medicine. Together with the "higher" professions, they were the formers of opinion through the press, associations and academies. The novelist and playwright Gustav Freytag noted in his "Pictures from Germany's Past": "Whoever writes a history of literature, art, philosophy and science in Germany is in fact dealing with the family history of the educated bourgeoisie."

Both the civil service and the free professions promoted the establishment of professional qualifications, and civil service members had entrance examinations instituted for gymnasiums and universities as well. The Bildungsbürgertum thus controlled access to its ranks and ensured its status as an elite group. Historian Hans-Ulrich Wehler described the resulting job market as "oligo-political".

Virtually all developments involving the Bildungsbürgertum were less pronounced in Germany's Catholic regions because the Catholic Church resisted new humanism, and schooling at all levels did not advance in the way that it had in Protestant areas.

=== 19th century ===
==== Size ====
The Bildungsbürgertum expanded along with the social changes brought about by the rapid economic growth after 1849. In Prussia, new humanism, Protestant rationalism, family tradition and reformed educational institutions provided nearly ideal conditions for growth. In Prussia in 1850, it was nevertheless only 0.3% of those employed who came from the Bildungsbürgertum. With family members, the estimated size for the entire class reached somewhere between 115,000 and 144,000 people. In all of Germany, the number was only an estimated 230,000 to 280,000 out of a population of 33.75 million. By 1871, the year of German unification, out of 39.23 million Germans, about 0.75%, or 240,000 to 300,000 of the employed population (not counting families), belonged to the Bildungsbürgertum. In 1913, just before the outbreak of World War I, their numbers had reached 550,000 to 650,000 of the employed, or about 1% of the population.

==== Political involvement ====
During the repressive period of the Vormärz (1815–1848), the Bildungsbürgertum began to become politically active for the first time, turning for the most part to political liberalism. In the revolutions of 1848, its strong representation in the Frankfurt National Assembly gave the class significant influence in the framing of the Constitution of St. Paul's Church. After the failure of the revolution, German liberalism split into smaller parties which resembled interest groups, and the growth of social democracy among the working class led to the Bildungsbürgertum losing its status as the leader in progressive politics. The vision of a German national state became a key value, and the founding of the German Empire in 1871 was greeted euphorically by the Bildungsbürgertum as it looked forward to new possibilities in the united nation. Protestants among the educated class saw the founding as a Providence-driven victory of the "German mission" – a "national Protestantism" that increasingly replaced traditional religion. The Bildungsbürgertum as a whole moved to the right and closer to the nobility, with new opportunities not just in the upper civil service but also in the military. Its student groups took up "pseudo-feudal codes of honour" and pseudo-military forms of behaviour. A minority of the Bildungsbürgertum though did not join the overall rightward turn. They transferred their frustrated political hopes to the individual under the humanistic ideal of growth through continual education.

==== Social development ====
The "religion of education" embodied in new humanism contributed to the 19th century's increasing secularisation. The idea of Bildung itself became an ersatz religion that offered a worldview that gave meaning to life and the means to communicate it to others. The Bildungsbürgertum's prestige grew as 19th century German instructional methods came to be seen as the model for the rest of the world. Upper-level civil servants, because of their highly valued management qualifications, diligence, focus on achievement and strong sense of duty, also exercised considerable political influence in federal, state and city governments. The developing middle class as a whole looked to the Bildungsbürgertum for its values and behavioural norms. When governments had to take on such new problems as rapid urbanisation and became in general more interventionist, there was an ever broadening need for the scientifically educated, which expanded opportunities for those seeking to move up.

During the imperial era (1871–1918), the Bildungsbürgertum's expansion through additions from the petite bourgeoisie led to some dilution of social cohesion and the consciousness of being part of an elite. At the same time, the Bildungsbürgertum was coming to see its status as an entitlement, with entry into the gymnasium and university an all but guaranteed pass to a prestigious career. The strive for life-long learning began to be replaced by career ambitions, and the development of character by the attainment of eligibility diplomas. Competition from other "secular religions" such as nationalism, social Darwinism, antisemitism and ideological imperialism also weakened the hold of the Humboldtian educational ideal. As was common across Europe, the Bildungsbürgertum imitated the nobility, but in Germany there remained a stronger division between the two classes than in England or France. The desire to be a distinct class from workers saw an increase in the Bildungsbürgertum's "hate- and fear-filled" insistence on social distance. Educational arrogance, illiberality, distancing from the "uneducated", susceptibility to nationalism and support of imperialism came to the fore. Philosopher and educator Friedrich Paulsen criticised the Bildungsbürgertum's "inhuman pride" and love of pomp as a way to show off its gentility to those they saw as socially below them. A prejudiced caste spirit grew up along with a narrow-minded national arrogance that passed for patriotism. Economist Johannes Conrad wrote that in no other country "is the sense of educational superiority so blatant and widespread as it is here". Historian Heinrich von Treitschke wrote that for only a few thousand educated, millions had to "plough, forge and plane".

=== 20th century ===
The Bildungsbürgertum joined in the "Spirit of 1914" that marked the outbreak of World War I with overwhelming enthusiasm. It experienced the war fervour as the dawn of a new era that would raise Germany's status among nations to the very top. Even as the war spirit declined in other social groups, it continued to spread in the Bildungsbürgertum. Their already strong nationalist sentiment increased, and its members dominated the right-wing German Fatherland Party when it was formed in 1917.

The Bildungsbürgertum's support for the war continued in spite of the fact that many of them suffered a significant reduction in income. Upper-level civil servants lost 47% of their purchasing power when compared to 1913, although among the lower echelons the reductions were not as severe. Some at all levels were ruined when the war bonds they had invested in became worthless. Government officials lost both economically and socially because their reduced incomes and savings led to a reduction in social prestige as well. Together with the shock of Germany's defeat in the war, the overthrow of the monarchy and the establishment of a socialist-led republican government, the Bildungsbürgertum's wartime setbacks led them to become strong supporters of an authoritarian system of government. Democracy threatened both their status and their worldview.

The Bildungsbürgertum had suffered relatively high casualties among the officer corps, the many student volunteers and regular draftees. During the Weimar Republic, the class made up about 0.8% of the population, with approximately 135,000 in employment, or 540,000 to 680,000 individuals when families are included. Their "intimate symbiosis" with the state and their faith in the idea of a new humanist education were both placed radically in question. The slaughter of the war made "the entire project of the ennobling of the individual through new humanist education" appear to have failed. From its first appearance in Germany in the 1770s, new humanism had seen the Germans as the Greeks of the modern age with a mission as the civilising force of a "cultural nation". For many, their radical patriotism continued, even (perhaps especially) after the rapid and catastrophic loss of their world in 1918.

After the Nazis came to power in 1933, the Bildungsbürgertum hoped that its fortunes would improve under the authoritarian regime, but they found themselves quickly disappointed. The 1933 Law for the Restoration of the Professional Civil Service (Berufbeamtengesetz) had an Aryan paragraph that ousted all Jews and political regulations that ousted everyone friendly to the Republic. The familiar departmental hierarchies were all but destroyed by the bureaucratic chaos.

Post-1945 members of the Mann family of writers and the dynasties of scientists, artists and politicians such as Weizsäcker, Dohnányi and Albrecht can be interpreted as modern relics of the Bildungsbürgertum, but historian Klaus Vondung believed that the Bildungsbürgertum ceased to exist as a class in 1918. Its loss of status and the collapse of its worldview was unlike any other in Wilhelmine society, although the process had begun even before the First World War.

== Urban development ==
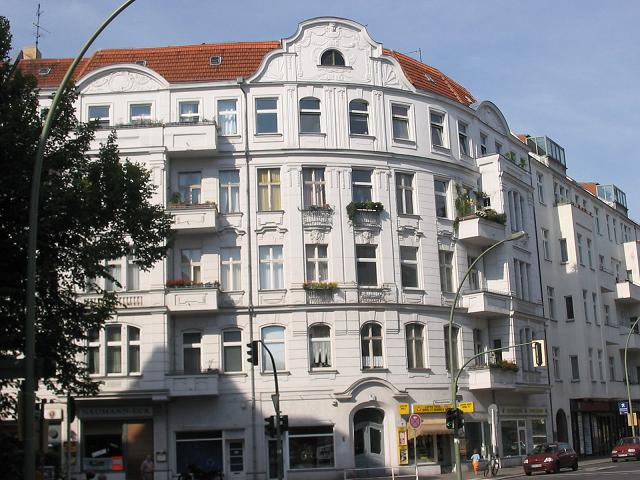
Gründerzeit (1870s) building in Berlin's Schöneberg district

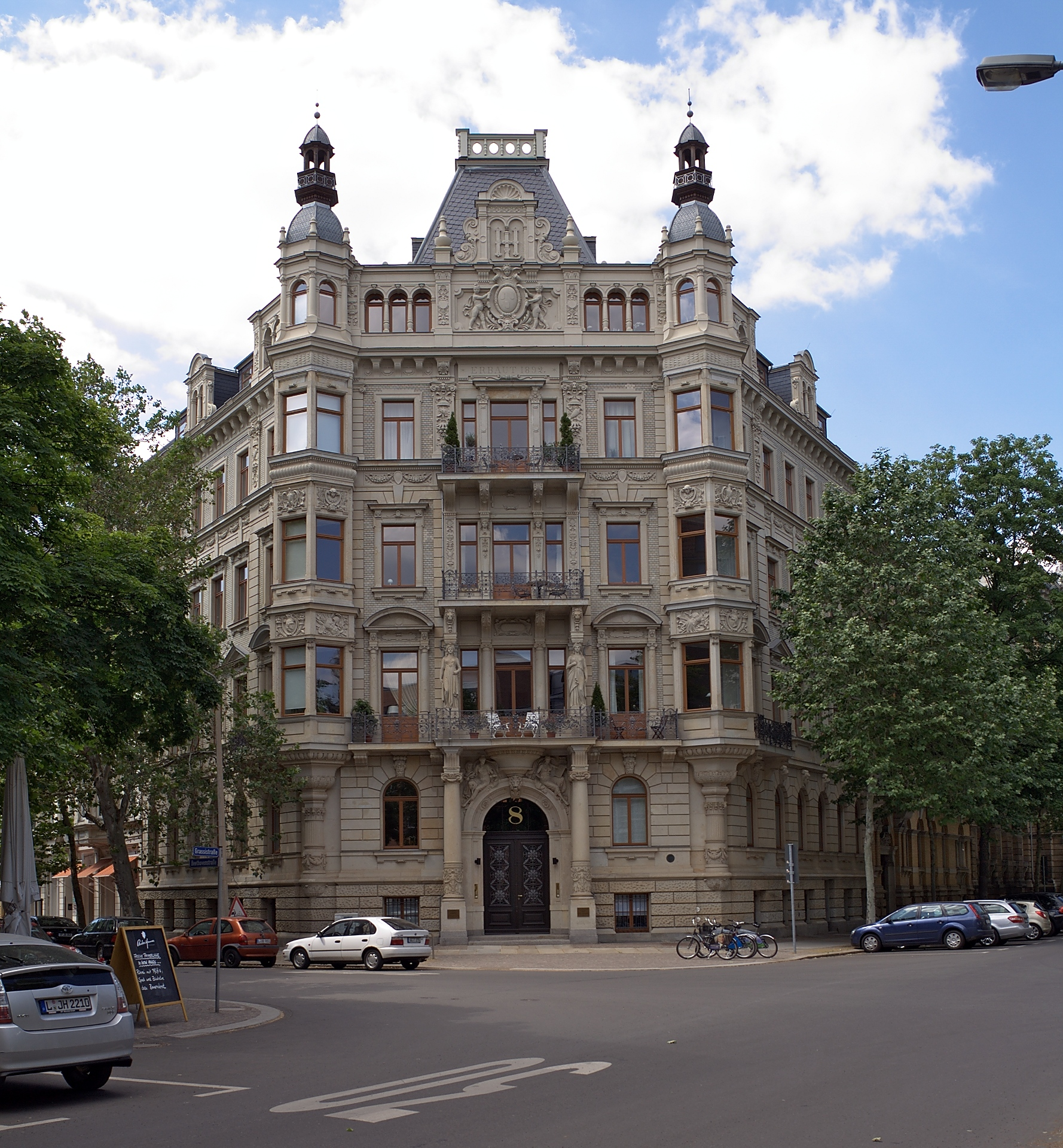
The Musikviertel in Leipzig is an example of the urban designs for the educated bourgeoisie during the Gründerzeit. Here: the Palais Rossbach

In the 19th century, new neighbourhoods and districts were established that were built to meet the needs of the emerging middle classes. The districts were usually generously surrounded by green spaces and had a certain representative character. They differed both from aristocratic city palaces and simple workers' accommodations.

The most famous examples of this type of urban development in large cities and university towns include:

=== Germany ===
- Berlin: Charlottenburg, Dahlem, Lichterfelde, Nikolassee, Schöneberg (especially the Bayerische Viertel), Wilmersdorf and the former Hansa-Viertel
- Dresden: Weißer Hirsch
- Frankfurt am Main: Bockenheim and Westend
- Halle (Saale): Paulusviertel (Halle)
- Hamburg: Hamburg-Nord and die Elbvororte
- Heidelberg: Neuenheim and Weststadt
- Leipzig: Musikviertel, Bachviertel and Waldstraßenviertel
- Munich: Neuhausen-Nymphenburg and Schwabing

=== Austria ===
- Salzburg: Riedenburg
- Vienna: Cottageviertel

=== Switzerland ===
- Basel: Bachletten, Basel-Am Ring
- Bern: Kirchenfeld (Bern)
- Zurich: Enge, Hottingen

== See also ==
- Cultural capital
- Professional–managerial class
- Grand Burgher (German Großbürger)
- Habitus (sociology)
- Hanseaten (class)
- High culture
- Intelligentsia
- Mentifact
- Patrician (post-Roman Europe)
- Scholar official (the first meritocratic class of history)
- Social environment
- Social status
- Symbolic capital
- Upper middle class

== Literature ==
- Kocka, Jürgen; Conze, Werner (1989). Bildungsbürgertum im 19. Jahrhundert: Politischer Einfluss und gesellschaftliche Formation [Bildungsbürgertum in the 19th Century: Political Influence and Social Formation] (in German). Stuttgart: Klett-Cotta. ISBN 3-608-91254-1.
- Gall, Lothar (2000). Bürgertum, liberale Bewegung und Nation. Ausgewählte Aufsätze [Bürgertum, Liberal Movement and Nation. Selected Essays] (in German). Munich: Orbis-Verlag. ISBN 978-3-572-01175-9.
- Hartmann, Michael (2002). Der Mythos von den Leistungseliten. Spitzenkarrieren und soziale Herkunft in Wirtschaft, Politik, Justiz und Wissenschaft [The Myth of the Meritocracy: Elite Careers and Social Background in Business, Politics, Justice, and Science] (in German). Frankfurt am Main: Campus Verlag. ISBN 3-593-37151-0.
- Herwig, Malte (2005). Eliten in einer egalitären Welt [The Elite in an Egalitarian World] (in German). Berlin: wjs-Verlag. ISBN 3-937989-11-0.
- Köhler, Oskar (1985). Bürger, Bürgertum (in German). Freiburg im Breisgau: Herder.
- Lepsius, Mario R., ed. (1992). "Das Bildungsbürgertum als ständische Vergesellschaftung" [The Bildungsbürgertum as Class-Based Socialization]. Lebensführung und ständische Vergesellschaftung [Lifestyle and Class-Based Socialization]. Stuttgart: Klett-Cotta.
- Schmid, Pia (1984). Deutsches Bildungsbürgertum. Bürgerliche Bildung zwischen 1750 und 1830 [German Bildungsbürgertum. Bourgeois Education Between 1750 and 1830] (Thesis) (in German). University of Frankfurt am Main.
