= Cultural capital =

Concept of social status and social mobility

In sociology, cultural capital refers to the social assets of an individual—such as education, knowledge, style of speech, aesthetic preferences, and credentials—that can promote social mobility within a stratified society. Cultural capital functions as a relational resource within systems of exchange and social recognition, encompassing both material and symbolic goods that are considered valuable in a given social context. It has contributed to the accumulation of social status and power and plays a central role in processes of social evaluation and legitimacy.

Pierre Bourdieu and Jean-Claude Passeron introduced the concept in the 1970s to explain persistent inequalities in educational achievement. Bourdieu later elaborated the theory in The Forms of Capital (1986), distinguishing three forms: embodied cultural capital, objectified cultural capital, and institutionalized cultural capital. Embodied cultural capital consists of internalized dispositions and competencies; objectified cultural capital refers to cultural goods such as books or artworks; and institutionalized cultural capital is represented by formally recognized credentials and qualifications.

Since its introduction, cultural capital has become a foundational concept in sociology and education research. It has been widely applied to analyses of social reproduction, class inequality, and institutional power, while also generating debates regarding its conceptual scope, empirical measurement, and applicability across different social contexts.

== Origin ==
In "Cultural Reproduction and Social Reproduction" (1977), Pierre Bourdieu and Jean-Claude Passeron introduced cultural capital to explain differences in children's performance levels and academic achievement within the French educational system in the 1960s.

Bourdieu further developed the concept in his essay "The Forms of Capital" (1985) and in his book The State Nobility: Élite Schools in the Field of Power (1996). In the essay, Bourdieu lists cultural capital among two other categories of capital: economic capital, which refers to the command of economic resources (money, assets, property); and social capital, which is the actual and potential resources linked to the possession of a durable network of institutionalized relationships of mutual acquaintance and recognition.

== Types ==
Embodied, objectified, and institutionalized cultural capital

There are three types of cultural capital: embodied capital, objectified capital, and institutionalized capital.

=== Embodied cultural capital ===
Embodied cultural capital comprises the knowledge, skills, dispositions, and competencies that are internalized through socialization and education. Unlike economic capital, it is not directly transferable between individuals, but is acquired over time as it becomes incorporated into a person's habitus (i.e., durable ways of thinking, perceiving, and acting). Because embodied cultural capital is accumulated through long-term exposure to cultural environments, it reflects both conscious learning and tacit absorption of norms, values, and cultural expectations.

Linguistic cultural capital, for example, refers to mastery of language, communication styles, and culturally valued forms of expression. The embodied cultural capital that shapes a person's modes of self-presentation, interaction, and interpretation is often closely associated with the dominant norms of the national or social culture.

==== Habitus and field ====
An individual's cultural capital is closely linked to their habitus (i.e., embodied dispositions and tendencies) and their position within a field (i.e., structured social spaces characterized by power relations and competition). Habitus refers to the durable dispositions inculcated through family background, education, and social experience, which guide perception, judgment, and action. It is shaped by social class, family environment, and everyday social interactions, and may evolve as individuals move between different social positions within a field.

In Bourdieu’s framework, a field is a social arena in which individuals and groups compete to define what forms of capital are legitimate and valuable. Because different fields (such as education, art, or politics) recognize and reward different forms of cultural capital, a particular type of capital may be considered legitimate in one context and less valued in another. The process by which certain forms of capital become socially recognized and authoritative is closely related to symbolic capital, or the power to impose recognition and legitimacy within a given social space.

=== Objectified cultural capital ===
Objectified cultural capital refers to material cultural goods (e.g., works of art, books, scientific instruments, or other cultural artefacts) that can be owned, exchanged, and transferred for economic profit.

However, the social and cultural value of these objects depends partly on the holder’s ability to appropriate and interpret them. According to Bourdieu, the mere possession of cultural goods does not automatically confer cultural competence; rather, their meaning and symbolic significance are most accessible to those with the relevant embodied cultural capital, including the knowledge and dispositions necessary for interpretation.

In this sense, while objectified cultural capital may circulate through market exchange, its cultural significance remains tied to embodied capacities.

=== Institutionalized cultural capital ===
Institutionalized cultural capital comprises an institution's formal recognition of a person's cultural capital, usually academic credentials or professional qualifications. Institutionalized cultural capital has an important role in the labor market (a job), wherein it allows the expression of the person's array of cultural capital as qualitative and quantitative measurements that can be compared with those of other people. The institutional recognition facilitates the conversion of cultural capital into economic capital by serving as a heuristic (practical solution) with which the seller can describe their cultural capital to the buyer.

== Theoretical research ==
The concept of cultural capital has generated extensive theoretical and empirical scholarship across sociology, education, and cultural studies.

Although most frequently applied in analyses of educational inequality, researchers have extended Bourdieu’s framework to examine broader processes of social stratification, institutional power, and cultural legitimacy.

Scholarly engagement with cultural capital has generally taken three forms: application, refinement, and critique. Some researchers employ the concept as an explanatory framework for understanding patterns of social reproduction. Others build upon or modify Bourdieu’s original formulation to account for contemporary cultural dynamics. Still others question aspects of its conceptual clarity, empirical measurement, or scope. While education remains the primary domain in which cultural capital theory has been operationalized, subsequent research has broadened its relevance to other forms of inequality and institutional contexts.

=== Expansion ===
A number of works extend Bourdieu's theory of cultural capital, without deviating from Bourdieu's framework of its different forms. Such works can be seen to explore unarticulated areas of Bourdieu's theory rather than construct a new theory.

One modification of Bourdieu's work is that of Emirbayer and Williams (2005), who use Bourdieu's notion of fields and capital to examine the power relations in the field of social services, particularly homeless shelters. The authors describe the two separate fields that operate in the same geographic location (the shelter) and the types of capital that are legitimate and valued in each. Specifically, they show how homeless people can possess "staff-sanctioned capital" or "client-sanctioned capital" and show how, in the shelter, they are simultaneously desirable and undesirable, and valued and disparaged, depending on which of the two fields they operate in. Although the authors do not clearly define staff-sanctioned and client-sanctioned capital as cultural capital, and they state that usually the resources that form these two capitals are gathered from a person's life as opposed to their family, it can be seen how their analysis applies Bourdieu's theory of cultural capital to inequality in a social setting.

Other researchers have introduced new variables into Bourdieu's concept of cultural capital. The work of Emmison and Frow (1998) centers on an exploration of the ability of information technology to be considered a form of cultural capital. The authors state that "a familiarity with, and a positive disposition towards the use of bourgeoisie technologies of the information age can be seen as an additional form of cultural capital bestowing advantage on those families that possess them." Specifically, computers are "machines" that form a type of objectified cultural capital, and the ability to use them is an embodied type of cultural capital. This work shows how Bourdieu's concept of cultural capital can be expanded and updated to include cultural goods and practices which are increasingly more important in determining achievement both in and outside school.

Dolby (2000) cites the work of Hage, who uses Bourdieu's theory of cultural capital to explore multiculturalism and racism in Australia. Hage's discussion around race is distinct from Bourdieu's treatment of migrants and their amount of linguistic capital and habitus. Hage actually conceives of "whiteness" as being a form of cultural capital. 'White' is not a stable, biologically determined trait, but a "shifting set of social practices." He conceptualizes the nation as a circular field, with the hierarchy moving from the powerful center (composed of 'white' Australians) to the less powerful periphery (composed of the 'others'). The 'others', however, are not simply dominated, but are forced to compete with each other for a place closer to the center. Bourdieu's notion of capital and fields is thus used to understand how people of non-Anglo ethnicities may try to exchange the cultural capital of their ethnic background with that of 'whiteness' to gain a higher position in the hierarchy. It is used to expose the arbitrary nature of what is "Australian" and how it is determined by those in the dominant position (mainly 'white' Australians). In a path-breaking study, Bauder (2006) uses the notions of habitus and cultural capital to explain the situation of migrants in the labor market and society.

Bourdieu's theory has been expanded to reflect modern forms of cultural capital. For instance, Asaf Nissenbaum and Limor Shifman (2017) study the topic of Internet memes, utilising the website 4chan to analyse how these memes can be seen as forms of cultural capital. Discourse demonstrates the different forums and media through which memes can be expressed, such as different 'boards' on 4chan. Additionally, scholars have extended Bourdieu's theory to the field of religion, where embodied cultural capital allows middle classes to develop distinctive religious styles and tastes. Through these styles and tastes, they draw symbolic class boundaries in opposition to fellow believers from lower-class backgrounds.

==== Education ====
Sociologist Paul DiMaggio expands on Bourdieu's view on cultural capital and its influence on education: "Following Bourdieu, I measure high school students' cultural capital using self-reports of involvement in art, music, and literature."

Retired teacher John Taylor Gatto, in his article "Against School: How public education cripples our kids, and why" (2003), addresses education in modern schooling. The relation of cultural capital can be linked to Alexander James Inglis' Principles of Secondary Education (1918), which indicates how American schooling is similar to Prussian schooling in the 1820s. The objective was to divide children into sections, grouping them by subject, age, and test score. Inglis introduced six basic functions for modern schooling. The third, fourth, and fifth basic functions are related to cultural capital and describe the manner in which schooling enforces the cultural capital of each child from a young age:

- Diagnosis and direction (function #3): School is meant to determine the proper social role of each student by logging mathematical and anecdotal evidence into cumulative records.
- Differentiation (function #4): Once a student's social role is determined, the children are sorted by role and trained only as merited for their social destination.
- Selection (function #5): This refers to Darwin's theory of natural selection applied to "the favoured races".

The idea is to help American society by consciously attempting to improve the breeding stock. Schools are meant to tag the socially unfit with poor grades, placement in remedial schooling, and other notable social punishments that may lead their peers to view them as intellectually inferior, and effectively bar them from the reproductive (sexual, economic, and cultural) sweepstakes of life. Gatto summarizes that this was the purpose of petty humiliation in school: "wash the dirt down the drain." The three functions are directly related to cultural capital because, through schooling, children are discriminated against based on social class and cognitively placed into the destination that will make them fit to sustain that social role. That is the path leading to their determined social class; and during the fifth function, they will be socially undesirable in the eyes of privileged children and so kept in a low social stratum.

Stanton-Salazar & Dornbusch (1995) examine how students with the desired types of cultural (and linguistic) capital transform this capital into "instrumental relations", or social capital, with institutional agents who can transmit valuable resources to them, furthering their academic success. They state that this is simply an elaboration of Bourdieu's theory. Similarly, Dumais (2002) introduces the variable of gender to determine how cultural capital increases educational achievement. The author shows how gender and social class interact to produce different benefits from cultural capital. In fact, in Distinction, Bourdieu states "sexual properties are as inseparable from class properties as the yellowness of lemons is inseparable from its acidity." He simply did not articulate the differences attributable to gender in his general theory of reproduction in the education system.

==== Cultural omnivores ====
Extending the theory of cultural capital, Richard A. Peterson and Albert Simkus (1992) conducted a secondary analysis of survey data from the US. They use the term "cultural omnivores" as a particular higher-status section in the US that has broader cultural engagements and tastes spanning an eclectic range from highbrow arts to popular culture.

Originally, it was Peterson (1992) who coined the term to address an anomaly observed in the evidence revealed by his work with Simkus (1992), which showed that people of higher social status, contrary to elite-mass models of cultural taste developed by French scholars with French data, were not averse to participation in activities associated with popular culture. The work rejected the universal adaptation of the cultural capital theory, especially in the 20th century in advanced post-industrial societies like the United States.

==== Science capital ====
In the UK, Louise Archer and colleagues (2015) developed the concept of science capital. The concept of science capital draws from the work of Bourdieu, particularly his studies focusing on the reproduction of social inequalities in society. Science capital comprises science-related cultural capital and social capital as well as habitus. It encompasses how a young person's experiences can shape their science identity and participation in science-related activities. The empirical work on science capital builds on a growing body of data on students' aspirations and attitudes to science, including University College London's ASPIRES Research and King's College London's Enterprising Science.

The concept of science capital was developed to understand why these science-related resources, attitudes and aspirations led some children to pursue science, while others did not. The concept provides policymakers and practitioners with a useful framework to help understand what shapes young people's engagement with (and potential resistance to) science.

== Critiques and debates ==
Since its introduction, the concept of cultural capital has generated substantial scholarly debate. Although widely influential in sociology and education studies, critics have questioned both its explanatory scope and its applicability beyond the contexts in which it was originally developed.

One major line of critique concerns Bourdieu’s emphasis on social reproduction and structural constraint. Some scholars argue that his framework places strong emphasis on the persistence of class-based cultural hierarchies, potentially underestimating individual agency and cultural change. Critics suggest that the theory portrays cultural hierarchies as more stable and deterministic than they may be in practice, particularly in societies characterized by rapid cultural transformation. Related criticisms focus on Bourdieu’s concept of habitus, which some have described as overly deterministic and insufficiently attentive to individual consciousness or reflexivity. However, other scholars contend that Bourdieu’s work attempts to reconcile structure and agency rather than eliminate agency altogether.

A second set of debates concerns the conceptual clarity and measurement of cultural capital. Critics argue that the concept has been operationalized in diverse and sometimes inconsistent ways, leading to variation in empirical findings. Some researchers have focused narrowly on “highbrow” cultural participation as an indicator of cultural capital, a limitation that has also been attributed to interpretations of Bourdieu’s own work. In response, several studies have attempted to refine measurement strategies in order to determine which aspects of middle-class culture are rewarded within educational systems.

Other scholars have expanded the concept by challenging the idea that dominant cultural capital is limited to elite or “highbrow” forms of culture. The “cultural omnivore” thesis, associated with Richard A. Peterson, argues that high-status individuals increasingly display broad and eclectic tastes rather than exclusive preference for elite culture. This perspective suggests that cultural capital may function differently in contemporary societies than in Bourdieu’s original analysis of mid-20th-century France.

Additionally, researchers have examined how cultural capital intersects with race, ethnicity, and gender. Some argue that dominant cultural capital is not equally accessible or rewarded across racial groups, even when individuals possess similar cultural competencies. Bourdieu has also been criticized for insufficient engagement with gender inequalities, particularly in labor market outcomes. Although he later addressed gender more directly in Masculine Domination, critics maintain that earlier formulations of cultural capital did not adequately theorize gendered power relations.

Finally, some scholars, including John Goldthorpe, have rejected aspects of Bourdieu’s account of cultural transmission, arguing that class differences do not necessarily produce uniform and enduring forms of habitus, and that educational institutions may function not only as mechanisms of reproduction but also as sites of re-socialization and mobility.

These debates have contributed to ongoing theoretical refinement and adaptation of cultural capital theory across sociology, education, and cultural studies.

== Digital capital as an autonomous form ==
In contemporary sociological research, "digital capital" has been proposed as an autonomous form of capital, distinct from but interrelated with Bourdieu's original triad of economic, social, and cultural capitals. Massimo Ragnedda (2018) conceptualized digital capital through its own embodied (digital skills) and objectified (digital resources) states. Rather than being a mere extension of cultural capital, it acts as a specific bridge that enables individuals to convert digital engagement into tangible life chances. Further research by Ragnedda and Maria Laura Ruiu (2020) explores how the unequal distribution of this autonomous capital plays a unique role in modern social stratification and the reproduction of social inequalities, functioning as a tool for converting technological engagement into social, cultural, economic, and political gains.

== See also ==
- Academic capital
- Cultural economics
- Cultural reproduction
- Cultural studies
- Culture change
- Culture industry
- Great British Class Survey
- Human capital
- Individual capital
