= Science capital =

Conceptual tool in sociology of education

Science capital is a conceptual tool developed by Louise Archer and colleagues at King's College London. It uses the theoretical frameworks created by French sociologist Pierre Bourdieu to summarise an individual’s science-related habitus and capital. It can be used to help understanding how social class affects people's aspirations and involvement in science. The concept comes from research in education but is also used more broadly in practice and policy, for instance in the work of the Science and Technology Committee of the House of Commons in the UK.

== Definition ==
Science capital can be defined as the sum of all the science-related knowledge, attitudes, experiences and resources that an individual builds up through their life. This includes what science they know about, what they think about science, the people they know who have an understanding of science, and the day-to-day engagement they have with science.

Science capital is made up of science related cultural and social capital (institutionalized and/or embodied through knowledge, consumption, credentials, and social networks) as well as habitus. Researchers have suggested that science capital does not exist in isolation but has its value determined by someone's wider context and environment.

Science capital has been framed around eight key dimensions, drawing on statistical analysis of survey data from UK school students:

1. Scientific literacy
2. Science-related attitudes, values and dispositions
3. Knowledge about the transferability of science (that science 'open doors' to many careers)
4. Science media consumption
5. Participation in out-of-school science learning contexts
6. Family science skills, knowledge and qualifications
7. Knowing people in science-related roles
8. Talking about science in everyday life

These eight dimensions collapse into four 'types' of science capital: what you know (scientific literacy); how you think (attitudes and dispositions); what you do (science-related activities and behaviours); and who you know (social contacts and networks). The first three 'types' include habitus and cultural capital and the fourth, social capital. Research shows that measuring science capital provides a better prediction of science aspirations than a general measure of capital.

== History ==
The concept of science capital draws on Pierre Bourdieu’s work about capital and social reproduction. Science capital builds on, but is distinct from, how Pierre Bourdieu used the terms scientific, technical or technological capital. Science Capital is not a new or separate form of capital. Instead, science capital is a way to think about grouping different kinds of science-related social and cultural capital, particularly those that people could use or exchange to support their attainment, engagement and/or participation in science.

Science capital was first developed by Louise Archer and colleagues in the ASPIRES project. Building on five years of research with youths aged 10–14 and their families, ASPIRES found that children from families with more science related-resources (such as parents with scientific hobbies or careers) were more likely to want to pursue science at school and as a career. The concept of science capital was developed as a way to understand why these science-related resources, attitudes and aspirations led some children to pursue science, while others did not.

Science capital was developed conceptually and empirically through the Enterprising Science project and the ASPIRES 2 project. The Enterprising Science project developed a survey to measure science capital and extended the concept of science capital beyond homes and into schools and museums. Science capital is being used to develop strategies for teaching in primary and secondary schools and to develop measures of science capital for adults.

== ASPIRES ==
ASPIRES, currently based at UCL Institute of Education, is a 10-year longitudinal research project studying young people’s science and career aspirations. The first ASPIRES study (2009-2013) tracked young people's science and career aspirations from age 10–14. ASPIRES 2 continues to track young people until age 19, to understand the changing influences of the family, school, careers education and social identities and inequalities on young people's science and career aspirations. Key findings include:

1. Students with low Science Capital are unlikely to see science as ‘for me’. In the first phase of our project, we introduced the term Science Capital to refer to someone’s science-related qualifications, understanding, knowledge (about science and ‘how it works’), interest and social contacts (e.g. knowing someone who works in a science-related job).
2. Enjoyment of Science doesn’t translate into science aspirations.
3. Current careers education is not just ‘patchy’ but patterned, particularly in terms of social inequalities.
4. The stratification of science at Key Stage 4 may be contributing to the STEM skills gap.
5. Girls pursuing the physical sciences post-16 are exceptional.

This project was first based at King’s College London, having moved to the UCL Institute of Education in March 2017. It is funded by the Economic and Social Research Council.

== Science capital in practice ==
Science capital is used across a variety of educational settings to support science learning, particularly for children. For instance, one British school aims to help students to develop science capital through taking part in science clubs, while on a larger scale, the Science Museum Group uses science capital as a concept to inform their strategy and work across all their partner institutions. In Ireland, Science Gallery Dublin aims to increase visitors’ science capital through their exhibitions. Similarly, in the US the Science Museum of Minnesota is working with science capital to combat inequalities in access to, and participation in, science learning.

In October 2017 the Science Capital Teaching Approach was launched at the National STEM Learning Centre in York, England. The approach was co-developed and trialled over four years between Enterprising Science researchers and secondary science teachers in England.
