= Richard A. Peterson =

Richard A. Peterson may refer to:

- Richard A. Peterson (aviator) (1923-2000), American fighter pilot and architect
- Richard A. Peterson (sociologist) (1932–2010), American sociologist at Vanderbilt University
- Richard A. Peterson (businessman), American businessman and former Deputy Director and Acting Director of the United States Mint
