= Humboldtian model of higher education =

Concept of academic education

Humboldt University of Berlin in August 2015

The Humboldtian model of higher education (German: Humboldtsches Bildungsideal) or just Humboldt's ideal is a concept of academic education that emerged in the early 19th century whose core idea is a holistic combination of research and studies. Sometimes called simply the Humboldtian model, it integrates the arts and sciences with research to achieve both comprehensive general learning and cultural knowledge. Several elements of the Humboldtian model heavily influenced the concept of the research university. The Humboldtian model goes back to Wilhelm von Humboldt, who in the time of the Prussian Reform Movement relied on a growing, educated middle class to promote his conception of general education.

Humboldt's educational model went beyond vocational training in Germany. In a letter to the Prussian king, he wrote:

There are undeniably certain kinds of knowledge that must be of a general nature and, more importantly, a certain cultivation of the mind and character that nobody can afford to be without. People obviously cannot be good craftworkers, merchants, soldiers or businessmen unless, regardless of their occupation, they are good, upstanding and – according to their condition – well-informed human beings and citizens. If this basis is laid through schooling, vocational skills are easily acquired later on, and a person is always free to move from one occupation to another, as so often happens in life.

In 2009, a philosopher and former State Minister of Culture of the Federal Republic of Germany, Julian Nida-Rümelin, has criticized discrepancies between Humboldt's ideals and the contemporary European education policy resulted from the Bologna Process – which in his view conceives education narrowly as preparation for the labor market.

The concept of holistic academic education was an idea of Wilhelm von Humboldt, a Prussian philosopher, government functionary and diplomat. As a privy councilor in the Interior Ministry, he reformed the Prussian education system after humanist principles. He founded the University of Berlin (now Humboldt University of Berlin), appointing distinguished scholars to both teach and conduct research there. Several scholars have labeled him the most influential education official in German history. Humboldt sought to create an educational system based on unbiased knowledge and analysis, combining research and teaching, while allowing students to choose their own course of study. The University of Berlin was later named after him and his brother, the naturalist Alexander von Humboldt.

== Background ==
Humboldt's model was based on two ideas of the Enlightenment: the individual and the world citizen. Humboldt believed that the university (and education in general, as in the Prussian education system) should enable students to become autonomous individuals and world citizens by developing their own powers of reasoning in an environment of academic freedom. Humboldt envisaged an ideal of Bildung, education in a broad sense, which aimed not merely to provide professional skills through schooling along a fixed path but rather to allow students to build individual character by choosing their own way.

Humboldt had studied the Greek classics since his youth, and was himself an epitome of Eliza Marian Butler's thesis about the important role of Ancient Greek literature and art in 19th-century German thinking. Humboldt believed that study of the Hellenic past would help the German national consciousness, reconciling it with modernity but distinguishing it from French culture, which he saw as rooted in the Roman tradition. The vehicle for this task was to be the university.

The cultural and historical background of the Humboldtian model answered the demands of the Bildungsbürgertum or educated middle class for greater general knowledge (Allgemeinbildung). The Bildungsbürgertum led the Prussian reforms of the early 19th century and managed to generate a knowledge society ante litteram.

Humboldt believed that teaching should be informed by current research, and that research should be unbiased and independent from ideological, economic, political or religious influences. The Humboldtian model strives for unconditional academic freedom in the intellectual investigation of the world, both for teachers and for students. Study should be guided by humanistic ideals and free thought, and knowledge should be formed on the basis of logic, reason, and empiricism rather than authority, tradition, or dogma. In line with the basic concept of Wissenschaft, Humboldt regarded philosophy as the link between the different academic disciplines, which include both humanities and natural sciences.

Humboldt encouraged the University of Berlin to operate according to scientific, as opposed to market-driven, principles such as curiosity, freedom of research, and internal objectives. Nevertheless, Humboldt was a political conservative (in Prussian terms) and saw the state as the major player in educational matters. In 1920, George Peabody Gooch claimed that Humboldt's idea of the state could only be realized in a "community of Humboldts".

== Principles ==
Humboldt's educational ideal developed around two central concepts of public education: The concept of the autonomous individual and the concept of world citizenship. The university should be a place where autonomous individuals and World Citizen are produced at or more specifically, produce themselves.

- An autonomous individual is to be an individual who attains self-determination and responsibility through his use of reason.
- "The Weltbürgertum is the collective bond, which connects autonomous individuals, irrespective of their social and cultural socialization: Humboldt says: 'To transform the world as much as possible into one's own person is, in the higher sense of the word, living'. The endeavor shall aim at working through the world comprehensively, and thereby unfold as a subject. To become a citizen of the world means, to deal with the big questions of humanity: to seek peace, justice, and care about the exchange of cultures, other gender relationships or another relationship to nature." University education should not be job-focused, but educational training that is independent of economic interests.

Academic freedom describes independence of the university from outside governmental and economic constraints. The university is to evade government influence. Humboldt demands that the scientific institution of higher education should lose itself "from all forms within the state". Therefore, his concept of university planned, for example, that the University of Berlin should have its own goods in order to finance itself and thereby secure its economic independence.

Academic freedom also demands, next to independence of the university from outside governmental and economic constraints, the independence from within; i.e. free choice of study and free organization of studies. The University should therefore be a place of permanent public exchange between all involved in the scientific process. The integration of their knowledge shall be pursued with the help of philosophy. Philosophy is supposed to represent a kind of basic science, which allows members of different scientific disciplines to bring an exchange of their discovery and to link them together. Humboldt's educational ideal formed German University History decisively for a long period, albeit it was never realized practically in its entirety or cannot be realized. Great intellectual achievements of German science is linked to it.

Georg Wilhelm Friedrich Hegel, Karl Marx, Friedrich Nietzsche, Sigmund Freud, Theodor W. Adorno and Albert Einstein confessed themselves to it.

== University concept ==
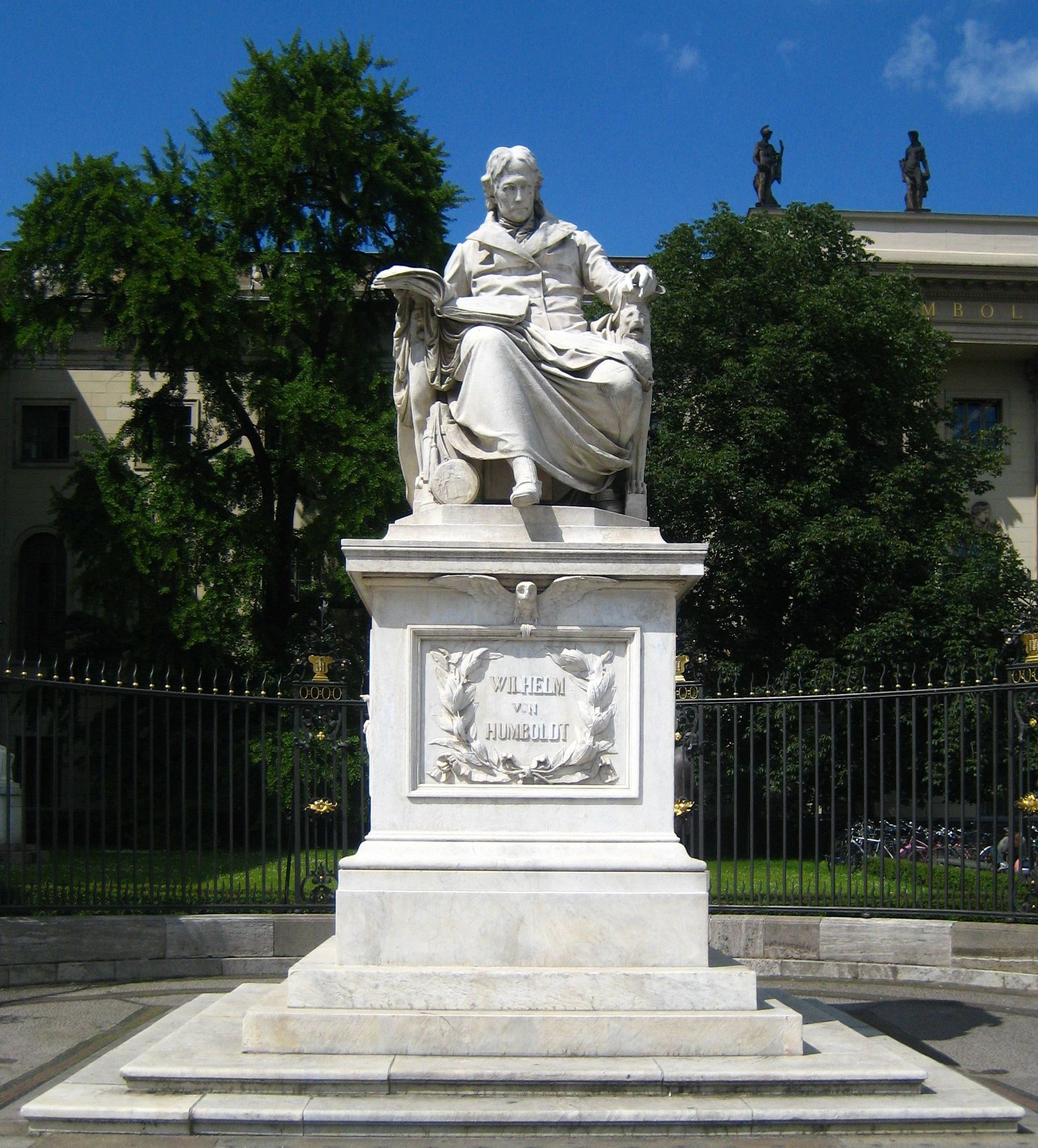
Statue of Wilhelm von Humboldt outside Humboldt University of Berlin

The University of Berlin, founded in 1810 under the influence of Wilhelm von Humboldt and renamed the Humboldt University of Berlin after World War II, is traditionally seen as the model institution of the 19th century. In fact, the German system emerged from innovations both before and after 1810. Among other scholars, Friedrich Schleiermacher, Friedrich Carl von Savigny, Johann Gottlieb Fichte and Barthold Georg Niebuhr were appointed by Humboldt.

The university's features included a unity in teaching and research, the pursuit of higher learning in the philosophy faculty, freedom of study for students (Lernfreiheit, contrasted with the prescriptive curricula of the French system) and corporate autonomy for universities despite state funding. In addition to Humboldt, the group of reformers in Prussia included philosophers such as Fichte and Schleiermacher, and Berlin University was a focus of national cultural revival. Humboldt was aware of other German philosophers' educational concepts, such as Kant, Hegel and Fichte. Schleiermacher was an important influence on the Berlin university.

== Impact ==
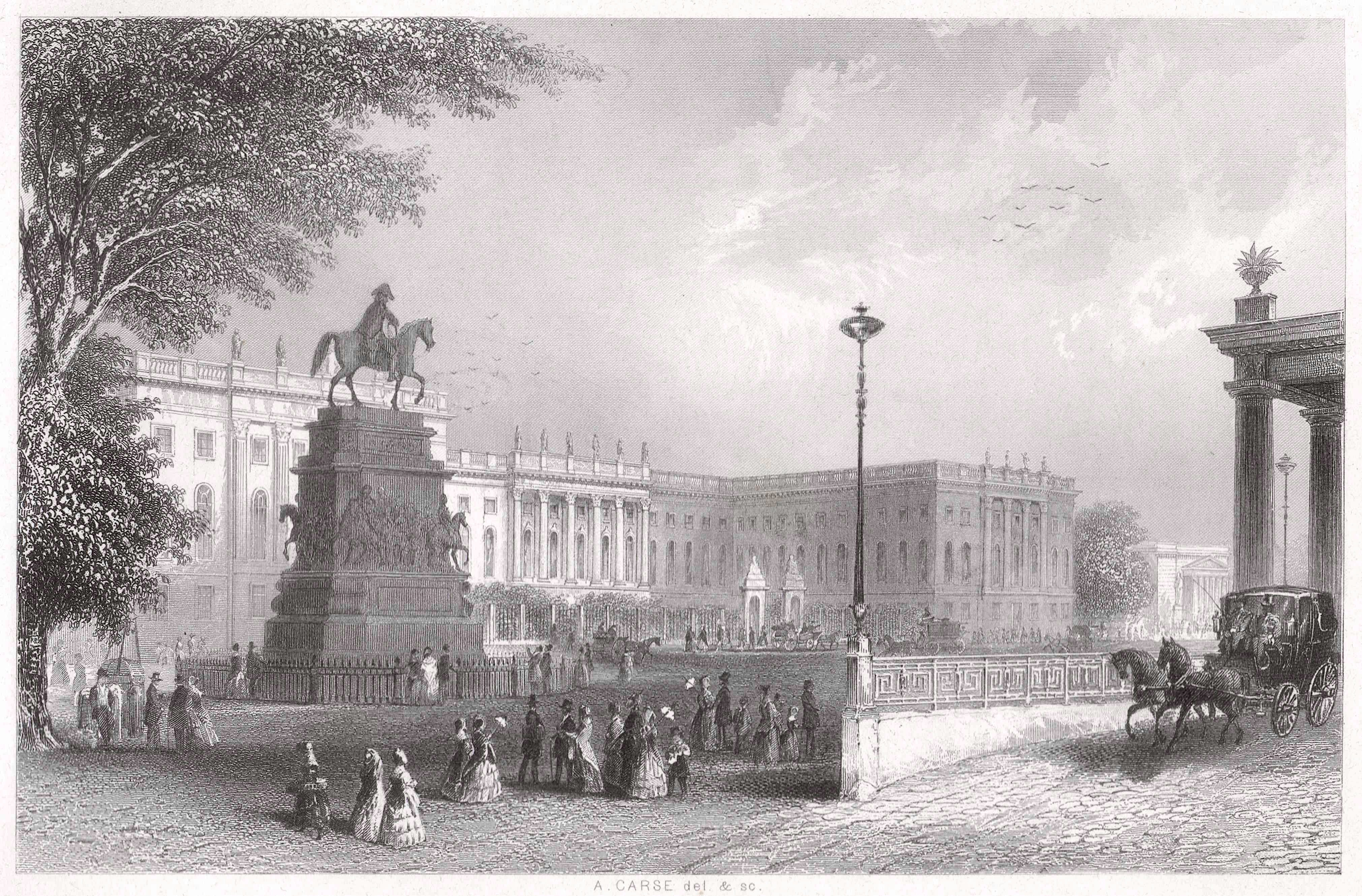
Humboldt University of Berlin in Berlin, c. 1850

These principles, in particular the idea of the research-based university, rapidly made an impact both in Germany and abroad. The Humboldtian university concept profoundly influenced higher education throughout central, eastern, and northern Europe. It was in competition with the post-Revolutionary French concept of the grandes écoles. The French system lacked the freedom of German universities and instead imposed severe discipline and control over curriculum, awarding of degrees, conformity of views, and personal habits, instituting, for example, a ban on beards in 1852. Universities built on the Humboldtian model have provided students with the ability to address recalcitrant problems, leading to major scientific breakthroughs with important economic effects.

American universities, starting with Johns Hopkins University, were early to adopt several of the German educational and scientific principles, which during the 20th century were globally recognized as valuable.

One difference to the Humboldtian model is that unlike English universities, German universities traditionally did not provide housing for their students. Following in the footsteps of the great German universities, the University of California adhered to that rule for over 80 years after its 1868 founding. After Clark Kerr became the first chancellor of UC Berkeley in 1952, he shifted UC Berkeley from the German model to the English model in which universities assume responsibility for providing and operating student housing.

In 1921, German students first began to form local private self-help organizations called Studentenwerke, spanning multiple universities, to construct the residence halls and cafeterias which their universities had failed to provide them. From 1969 to 1975, these organizations were transitioned from private non-profits to state-run non-profits.

=== 20th century ===
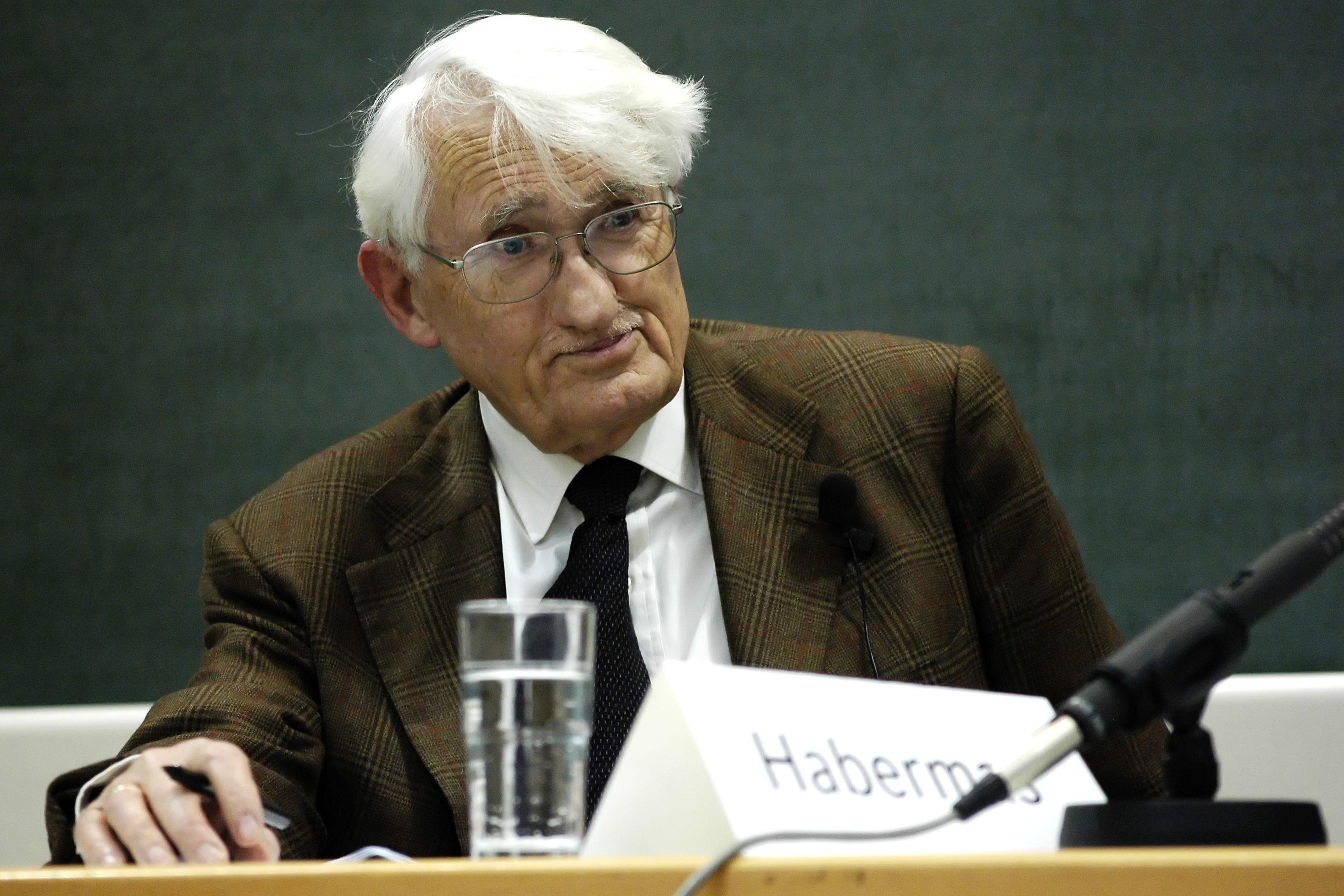
Jürgen Habermas, who has promoted Humboldt's educational ideals

In the 1960s, the Humboldtian model of the university attracted renewed interest and was discussed internationally. The German sociologist and philosopher Jürgen Habermas actively promoted Humboldt's ideas.

In the 1970s, breakthrough discoveries in biotechnology and patent legislation favoring market-oriented research such as the Bayh–Dole Act in the US allowed for the creation of research partnerships between universities and industry, with the objective of rapidly bringing innovations to market. (The earliest such partnerships in the US, such as Stanford Research Park, date back to the postwar period.) A similar development has taken place in all industrial countries, based on proposals of the OECD. This innovation of the "market university" as an economic engine, which first emerged in the US, diverges from Humboldt's principles. In a 2012 study, Ståhle and Hautamäki doubted the long-term sustainability of what they termed a "contradictory science policy", and argued for a return to a neo-Humboldtian approach to the university that would aim less for "innovation than for civilization" and reinstate the basic Humboldtian principles of academic freedom and autonomy for educational institutions, the pursuit of knowledge as a basis for both civilization and education (German Bildung), and unity in teaching and research.

The implications of the Humboldtian approach and of the conflict between market-driven and idealistic approaches to higher education have led to ironic results in the late 20th and early 21st centuries. Though elite private universities in the US do charge high tuition fees, both universities and their students also benefit from charitable donations as well as from government support. This combination of resources results in lavish funding that far exceeds the budgets of German universities, which are state-funded and mostly tuition-free.

==== Current debate ====
While during Humboldt's time universities mainly conducted state-organized academic research, there are now in Germany's tertiary education new forms of higher education, which now all have a scientific mission to research. However, Humboldt is still being discussed in Germany. Current problems and policy decisions regarding German education are addressed by a joint initiative called Konzertierte Aktion Internationales Marketing für den Bildungs- und Forschungsstandort Deutschland (KAIM). KAIM coordinates efforts of the partners, which include the state and federal government, universities, trade unions and industry associations.

The name of the group, KAIM, refers to earlier cooperative efforts, for example the Konzertierte Aktion at the end of the 1960s. It tries to improve the international position of German education and research capacities, including marketing. Estimating that American universities receive US$10 billion annually from tuition fees and other financial contributions, which KAIM sees as an important source of revenue for the United States, they have warned Germany to prepare for American attempts to market the American university model via the World Trade Organization in order to corner the international educational and research market. The Humboldt concept and its image are used by different and sometimes opposing parties in the German debate.

In Germany, the German Universities Excellence Initiative was begun in 2005–06 to counter the perceived lack of cutting-edge achievement in both research and education in the state-funded universities. This initiative is primarily driven and funded at the federal level. The American tradition of large private grants and foundations for science has been mirrored in the 21st century, for example at Freiberg University of Mining and Technology. Freiberg University, one of the oldest mining schools in the world, narrowly escaped closure after German reunification. In 2007, it received a private grant in the triple-digit millions of euros from the Dr.-Erich-Krüger-Stiftung (Dr. Erich Krüger Foundation), the largest grant ever made to a state-owned university in Germany. Peter Krüger, the Munich-based real estate and food retail entrepreneur who endowed the foundation, was born in Freiberg and started an apprenticeship there in 1946, but was driven away by the East German communists because of his bourgeois background. He was made an honorary senator of the University of Mining and Technology in 2007.

Critics see in many current reforms, such as the Bologna process, a departure from Humboldt's ideal towards greater occupational studies with economic interests. Furthermore, it is criticized that the freedom of teaching is restricted by the Bologna process.

== See also ==
- Liberal arts education
