= High culture =

Form of culture valued by opinion-elites

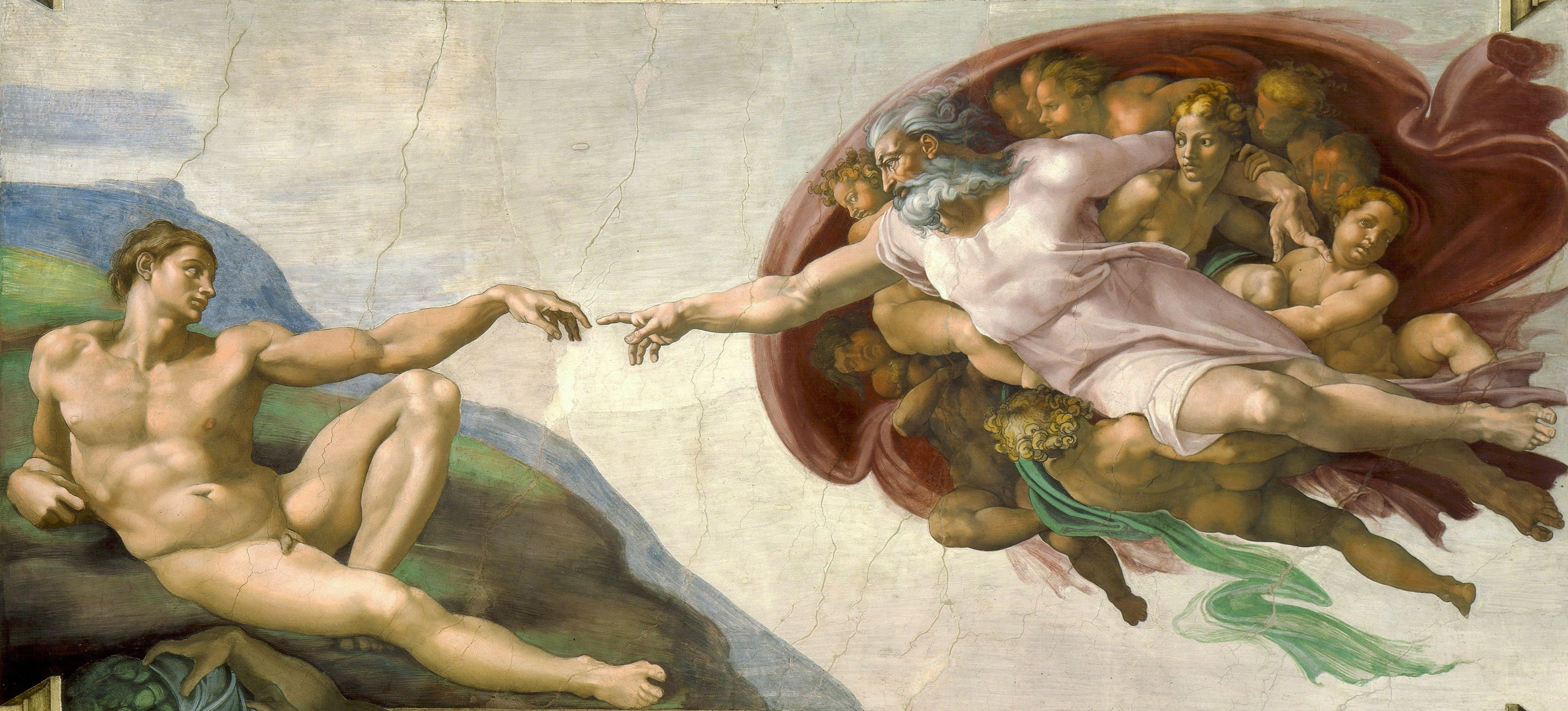
The Creation of Adam, from Michelangelo’s Sistine Chapel ceiling – an example of high culture

In a society, high culture encompasses cultural objects of aesthetic value that a society collectively highly esteems. It can include works of art (such as literature and music), history, and philosophy that a society considers respectable representatives of its culture.

In popular usage, the term high culture identifies the culture either of the upper class (an aristocracy) or of a status class (the intelligentsia); "high culture" also identifies a society's common repository of broad-range knowledge and tradition (folk culture) that transcends its social-class system. Sociologically, the term is contrasted with "low culture", which comprises the forms of popular culture characteristic of the less-educated social classes, such as the barbarians, the philistines, and hoi polloi (the masses), although in practice the upper classes very often also enjoy low culture and lower classes also enjoy high culture.

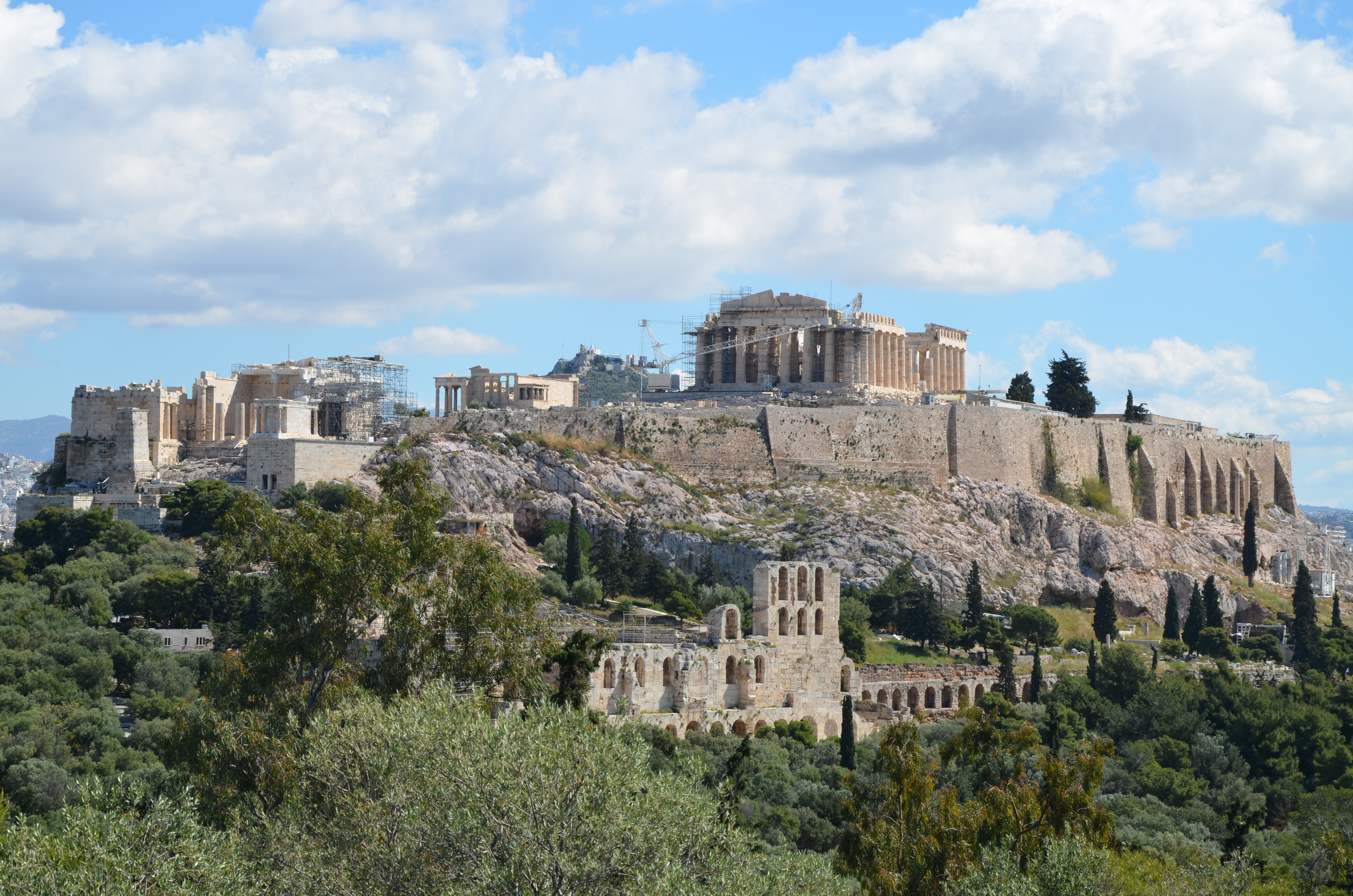
The Acropolis of Athens, Greece

Matthew Arnold introduced the term "high culture" in his 1869 book Culture and Anarchy. Its preface defines "culture" as "the disinterested endeavour after man's perfection" pursued, obtained, and achieved by effort to "know the best that has been said and thought in the world". Such a definition also includes philosophy. Moreover, the philosophy of aesthetics proposed in high culture is a force for moral and political good. Critically, the term "high culture" is contrasted with the "low culture" terms "popular culture" and "mass culture".

In Notes Towards the Definition of Culture (1948), T. S. Eliot writes that high culture and popular culture are necessary and complementary parts of a society's culture. In The Uses of Literacy (1957), Richard Hoggart presents the sociologic experience of working-class people in acquiring at university the cultural literacy that facilitates upward social mobility. In the U.S., Harold Bloom and F. R. Leavis pursued the definition of high culture by way of the Western canon of literature. Media theorist Steven Johnson writes that, unlike popular culture, "the classics—and soon to be classics—are in their own right descriptions and explanations of the cultural systems that produced them" and that "a crucial way in which mass culture differs from high art" is that individual works of mass culture are less interesting than the broader cultural trends that produced them.

== History in the West ==
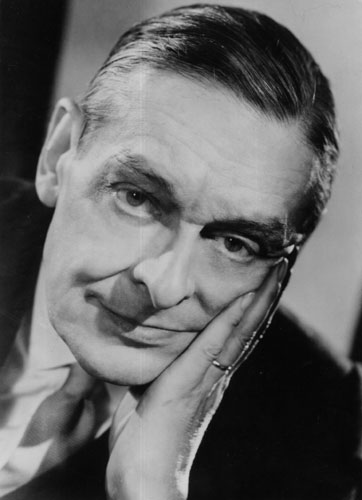
T. S. Eliot

The high culture of the West originated in the classical-world traditions of intellectual and aesthetic life in Ancient Greece (from c. 8th century BC – AD 147) and Ancient Rome (753 BC – AD 476). In the classical Greco-Roman tradition, the ideal mode of language was published and preserved in works of elevated style (correct grammar, syntax, and diction). Certain forms of language used by authors in valorized epochs were held up in antiquity and the Renaissance as eternal valid models and normative standards of excellence; e.g. the Attic dialect of ancient Greek spoken and written by the playwrights and philosophers of Periclean Athens (fifth century BC); and the form of classical Latin used in the "Golden Age" of Roman culture (c. 70 B.C. – AD 18) represented by such figures as Cicero and Virgil. This form of education was known to the Greeks as παιδεία, which was translated by the Romans into Latin as humanitas since it reflected a form of education aiming at the refinement of human nature, rather than the acquisition of technical or vocational skills. Indeed, the Greco-Roman world tended to see such manual, commercial, and technical labor as subordinate to purely intellectual activities.

From the idea of the "free" man with sufficient leisure to pursue such intellectual and aesthetic refinement, arose the classical distinction between the "liberal" arts which are intellectual and done for their own sake, as against the "servile" or "mechanical" arts which were associated with manual labor and done to earn a living. This implied an association between high culture and the upper classes whose inherited wealth provided such time for intellectual cultivation. The leisured gentleman not weighed down by the necessity of earning a living, was free to devote himself to activities proper to such a "free man" – those deemed to involve true excellence and nobility as opposed to mere utility.

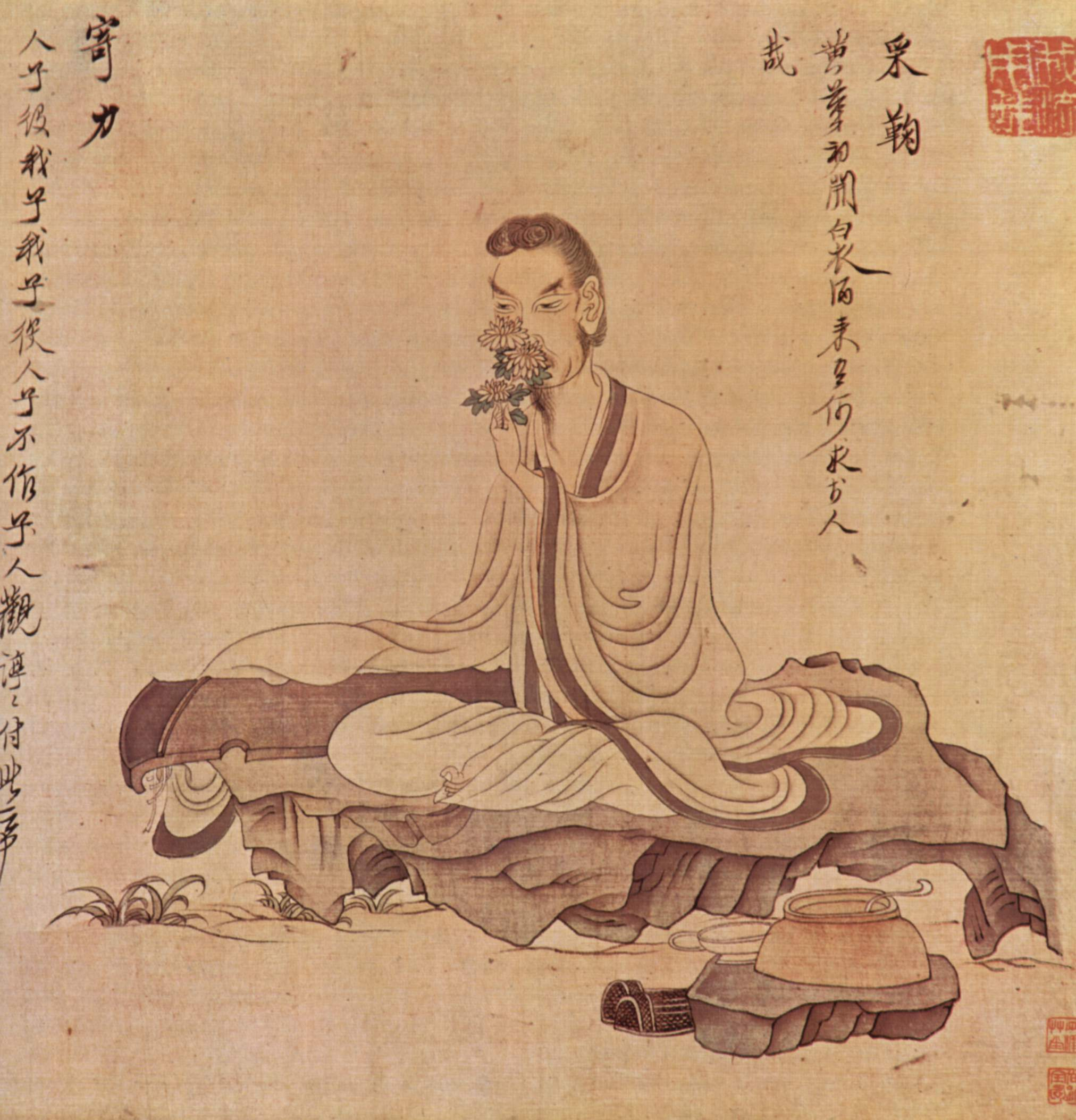
A painting by Ming Dynasty artist Chen Hongshou showing a scholar-gentleman (literai) with a guqin, a Chinese musical instrument

During the Renaissance, the classical intellectual values of the fully rediscovered Greco–Roman culture were the cultural capital of the upper classes (and the aspiring), and aimed at the complete development of human intellectual, aesthetic, and moral faculties. This ideal associated with humanism (a later term derived from the humanities or studia humanitatis), was communicated in Renaissance Italy through institutions such as the Renaissance court schools. Renaissance humanism soon spread through Europe becoming much of the basis of upper class education for centuries. For the socially ambitious man and woman who means to rise in society, The Book of the Courtier (1528), by Baldassare Castiglione, instructs the reader to acquire and possess knowledge of the Greco–Roman Classics, being education integral to the social-persona of the aristocrat. A key contribution of the Renaissance was the elevation of painting and sculpture to a status equal to the liberal arts (hence the visual arts lost for elites any lingering negative association with manual artisanship). The early Renaissance treatises of Leon Battista Alberti were instrumental in this regard.

The evolution of the concept of high culture initially was defined in educational terms largely as critical study and knowledge of the Greco–Roman arts and humanities which furnished much of the foundation for European cultures and societies. However, aristocratic patronage through most of the modern era was also pivotal to the support and creation of new works of high culture across the range of arts, music, and literature. The subsequent prodigious development of the modern European languages and cultures meant that the modern definition of the term "high culture" embraces not only Greek and Latin texts, but a much broader canon of select literary, philosophical, historical, and scientific books in both ancient and modern languages. Of comparable importance are those works of art and music considered to be of the highest excellence and broadest influence (e.g. the Parthenon, the painting and sculpture of Michelangelo, the music of Johann Sebastian Bach, etc). Together these texts and art works constitute the exemplary artifacts representing the high culture of the Western world.

=== Cultural traditions ===
In the Western and some East Asian traditions, art that demonstrates the imagination of the artist is accorded the status of high art. In the West this tradition began in Ancient Greece, was reinforced in the Renaissance, and by Romanticism, which eliminated the hierarchy of genres within the fine arts, which was established in the Renaissance. In China there was a distinction between the literati painting by the scholar-officials and the work produced by common artists, working in largely different styles, or the decorative arts such as Chinese porcelain, which were produced by unknown craftsmen working in large factories. In both China and the West the distinction was especially clear in landscape painting, where for centuries imaginary views, produced from the imagination of the artist, were considered superior works.

=== Cultural capital ===
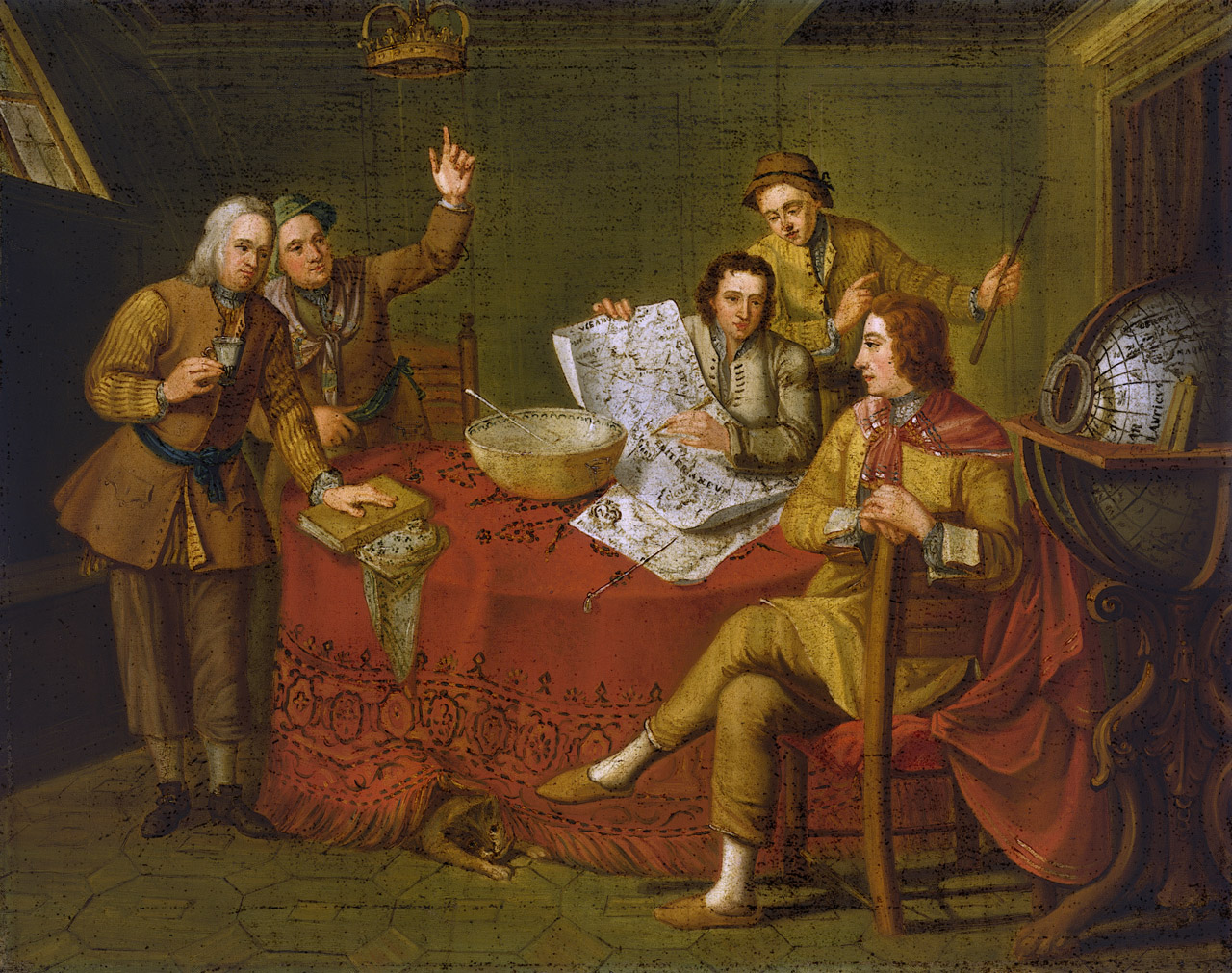
Four English lords on ship during their Grand Tour, 1731–32

In socially-stratified Europe and the Americas, a first-hand immersion to the high culture of the West, the Grand Tour of Europe, was a rite of passage that complemented and completed the book education of a gentleman, from the nobility, the aristocracy, and the bourgeoisie, with a worldly perspective of society and civilisation. The post-university tour of the cultural centres of Europe was a social-class benefit of the cultural capital transmitted through the high-status institutions (schools, academies, universities) meant to produce the ideal gentleman of that society.

The European concept of high culture included cultivation of refined etiquette and manners; the education of taste in the fine arts such as sculpture and painting; an appreciation of classical music and opera in its diverse history and myriad forms; knowledge of the humane letters (literae humaniores) represented by the best Greek and Latin authors, and more broadly of the liberal arts traditions (e.g. philosophy, history, drama, rhetoric, and poetry) of Western civilisation, as well as a general acquaintance with important concepts in theology, science, and political thought.

== High art ==
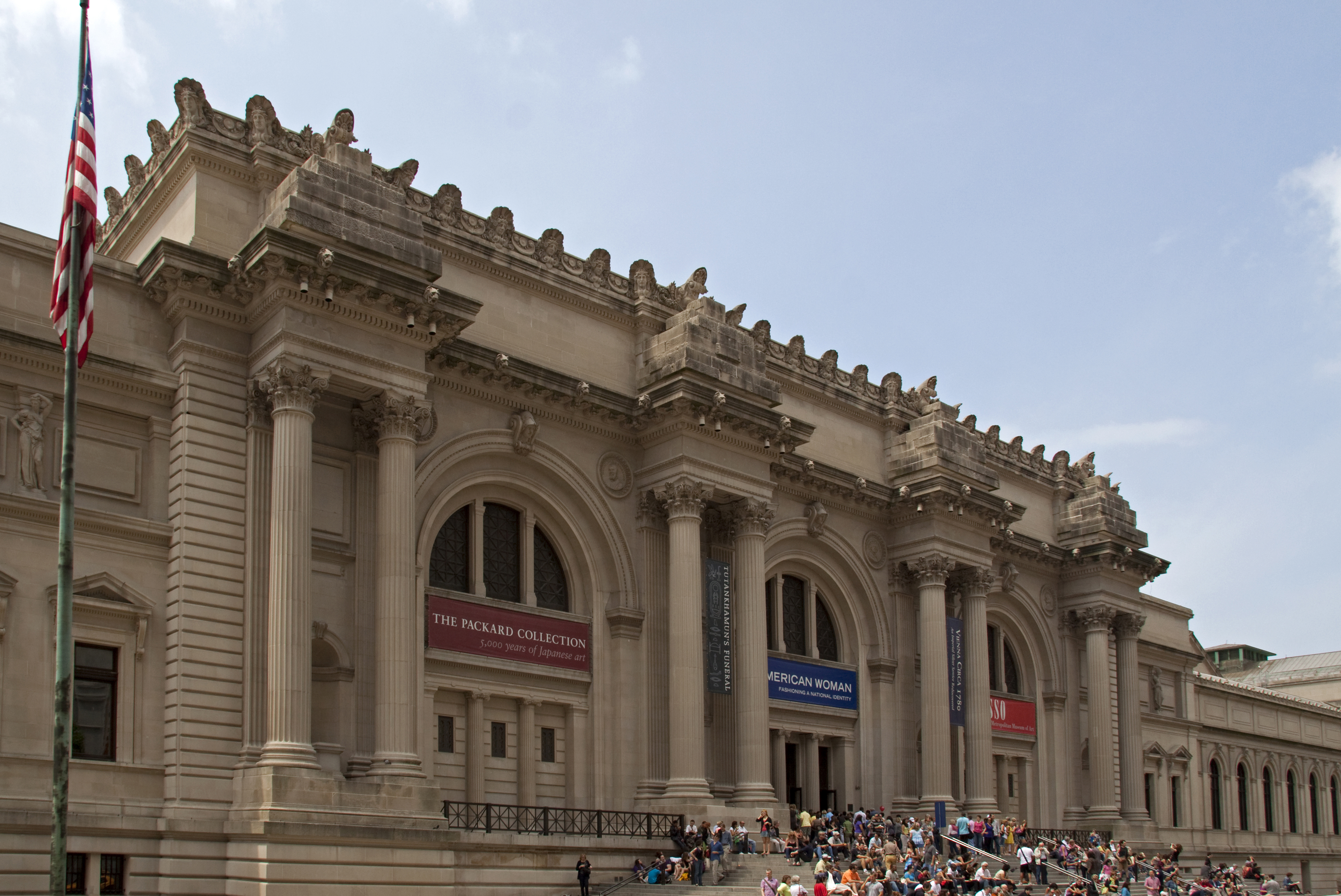
The Metropolitan Museum of Art in Manhattan, New York, United States

Much of high culture consists of the appreciation of what is sometimes called "high art". This term is rather broader than Arnold's definition and besides literature includes music, visual arts (especially painting), and traditional forms of the performing arts (including some cinema). The decorative arts would not generally be considered high art. The cultural products most often regarded as forming part of high culture are most likely to have been produced during periods of high civilization, for which a large, sophisticated, and wealthy urban-based society provides a coherent and conscious aesthetic framework, and a large-scale milieu of training, and, for the visual arts, sourcing materials and financing work. Such an environment enables artists, as near as possible, to realize their creative potential with as few as possible practical and technical constraints, though many more could be found on the cultural and economic side. Although the Western concept of high culture concentrates on the Greco-Roman tradition, and its resumption from the Renaissance onwards, such conditions existed in other places at other times.

== Art music ==
Art music (or serious music, classical music, cultivated music, canonical music or erudite music) is an umbrella term used to refer to musical traditions implying advanced structural and theoretical considerations and a written musical tradition. The notion of art music is a frequent and well-defined musicological distinction – musicologist Philip Tagg, for example, refers to art music as one of an "axiomatic triangle consisting of 'folk', 'art' and 'popular' musics". He explains that each of these three is distinguishable from the others according to certain criteria, with high cultural music often performed to an audience whilst folk music would traditionally be more participatory; high culture music is small-scale and performed at the local level rather than as mass-produced pop music; it is stored in written form rather than non-written; it is often made for a diverse group of people as opposed to a socioculturally heterogeneous audience; non-industrious high art music spreads in many locales rather than pop music which is possible in industrious economies only; it is not made to compete in the free market place of music. In this regard, "art music" frequently occurs as a contrasting term to "popular music" and to "traditional" or "folk music".

== Art film ==
Art film is the result of filmmaking which is typically a serious, independent film aimed at a niche market rather than a mass market audience. Film critics and film studies scholars typically define an "art film" using a "...canon of films and those formal qualities that mark them as different from mainstream Hollywood films", which includes, among other elements: a social realism style; an emphasis on the authorial expressivity of the director or writer; and a focus on the thoughts and dreams of characters, rather than presenting a clear, goal-driven story. According to the film scholar David Bordwell, "art cinema itself is a film genre, with its own distinct conventions."

== Promotion ==
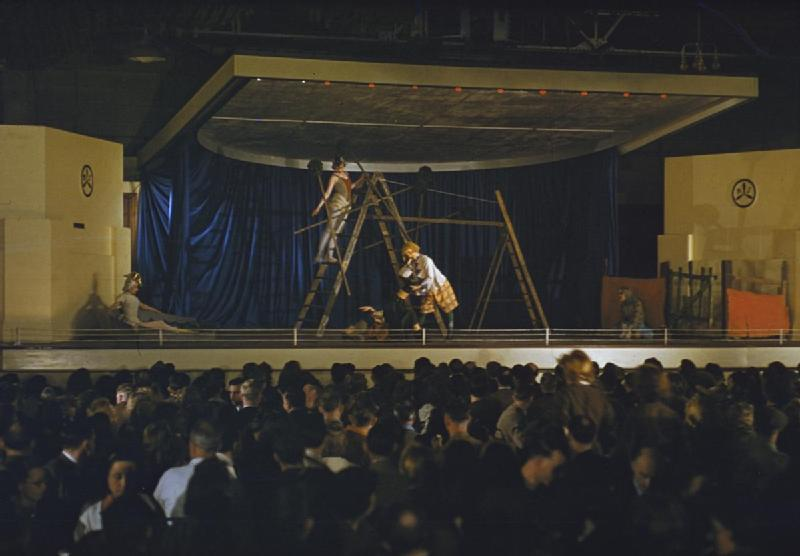
Dancers from the Ballet Rambert, under the auspices of CEMA, a government programme, perform Peter and The Wolf at an aircraft factory in the English Midlands during World War II.

The term has always been susceptible to attack for elitism, and, in response, many proponents of the concept devoted great efforts to promoting high culture among a wider public than the highly educated bourgeoisie whose natural territory it was supposed to be. There was a drive, beginning in the 19th century, to open museums and concert halls to give the general public access to high culture. Figures such as John Ruskin and Lord Reith of the BBC in Britain, Leon Trotsky and others in Communist Russia, and many others in America and throughout the western world have worked to widen the appeal of elements of high culture such as classical music, art by old masters and the literary classics.

With the widening of access to university education, the effort spread there, and all aspects of high culture became the objects of academic study, which with the exception of the classics had not often been the case until the late 19th century. University liberal arts courses still play an important role in the promotion of the concept of high culture, though often now avoiding the term itself.

Especially in Europe, governments have been prepared to subsidize high culture through the funding of museums, opera and ballet companies, orchestras, cinema, public broadcasting stations such as BBC Radio 3, ARTE, and in other ways. Organizations such as the Arts Council of Great Britain, and in most European countries, whole ministries administer these programs. This includes the subsidy of new works by composers, writers and artists. There are also many private philanthropic sources of funding, which are especially important in the US, where the federally funded Corporation for Public Broadcasting also funds broadcasting. These may be seen as part of the broader concept of official culture, although often a mass audience is not the intended market.

The New York Times "Arts & Leisure" section, from 1962 to 1988, featured articles on high culture which usually outranked popular culture. But by 1993, articles on pop culture (49%) soon outranked the ones on high culture (39%) thanks to advertising effecting editorial coverage (mostly on the latest motion pictures). Advertising on literature, however, has been prominent since the novel became a popular literary genre in the 19th century. Authors like Charles Dickens, Henry James and James Joyce worked in advertisement before their literary careers and/or had used ads on their novels.

== Theories ==
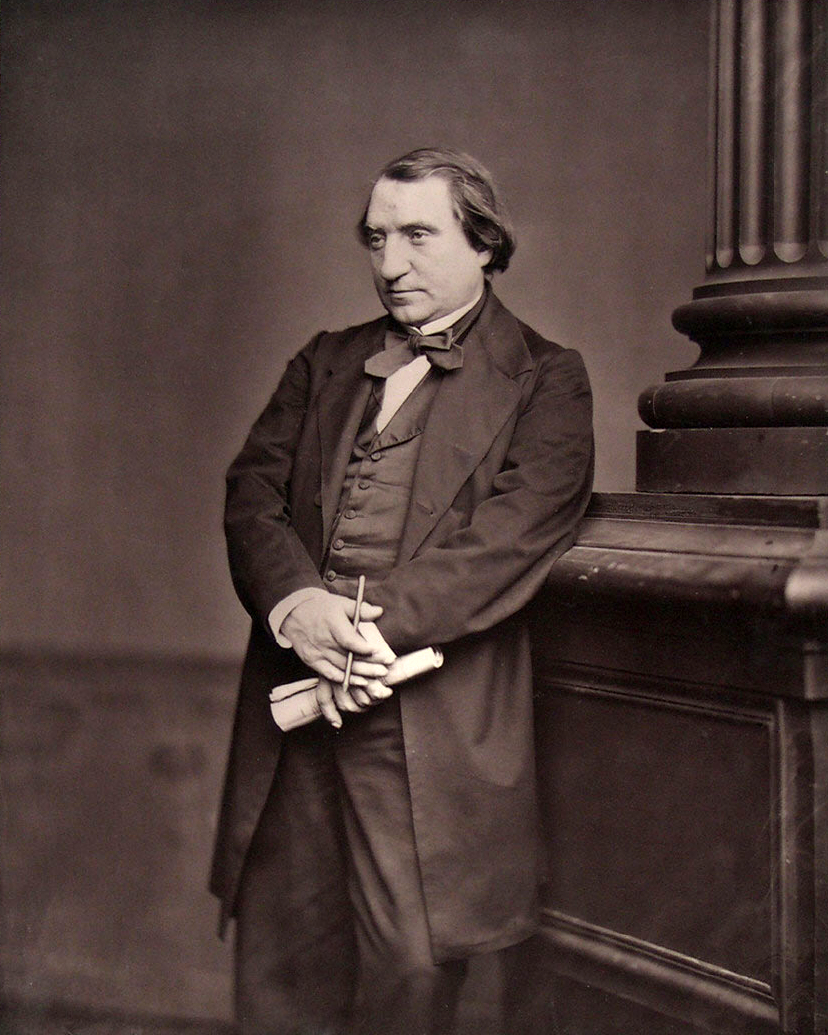
Ernest Renan (Antoine Samuel Adam-Salomon, 1870s)

The relations between high culture and mass culture are concerns of cultural studies, media studies, critical theory, sociology, Postmodernism and Marxist philosophy. In the essay "The Work of Art in the Age of Mechanical Reproduction" (1936), Walter Benjamin explored the relations of value of the arts (high and mass) when subjected to industrial reproduction. The critical theoreticians Theodor W. Adorno and Antonio Gramsci interpreted the high-art and mass-art cultural relations as an instrument of social control, with which the ruling class maintain their cultural hegemony upon society.

For the Orientalist Ernest Renan and for the rationalist philosopher Ernest Gellner, high culture was conceptually integral to the politics and ideology of both conservatism and nationalism, as a requisite part of a healthy national identity. Gellner expanded the conceptual scope of the phrase in Nations and Nationalism (1983) stating that high art is "a literate, codified culture, which permits context-free communication" among cultures.

In Distinction: A Social Critique of the Judgement of Taste (1979), the sociologist Pierre Bourdieu proposed that aesthetic taste (cultural judgement) is in large part derived from social class. Social class establishes the definitions of high art, e.g. in social etiquette, gastronomy, oenology, military service. In such activities of aesthetic judgement, the ruling-class person uses social codes unknown to middle-class and lower-class persons in the pursuit and practice of activities of taste.

== See also ==
- Achieved status
- Bildung
- Bildungsbürgertum
- Culturology
- Fine art
- General knowledge
- High society
- High:
  - Highbrow
  - Higher education
  - Western canon
- Non-high:
  - Middlebrow
  - Working class culture
