= Richard Peterson =

Richard Peterson may refer to:

- Richard Peterson (fencer) (1940–2018), New Zealand fencer and lawyer
- Richard Peterson (tennis) (1884–1967), Norwegian Olympic tennis player
- Richard A. Peterson (aviator) (1923–2000), American fighter pilot and architect
- Richard A. Peterson (sociologist) (1932–2010), American sociologist and professor of sociology
- Richard E. Peterson (1920–2009), American politician
- Richard L. Peterson (born 1972), American behavioral economist and psychiatrist
- Dickie Peterson (1946–2009), American bassist and lead singer for Blue Cheer
- Minty Peterson, fictional character in EastEnders

== See also ==
- Richard Peters (disambiguation)
