= Levasseur Inlet =

Inlet in Nunavut, Canada

Levasseur Inlet (72°35′N 085°35′W) is a body of water in Nunavut's Qikiqtaaluk Region. It lies on the eastern side of Admiralty Inlet on Baffin Island's Borden Peninsula.
