= Saneruarsuk Islands =

Island group in Nunavut, Canada

- Location within Nunavut Location within Canada

Geography
- Location: Northern Canada
- Coordinates: 72°13′N 85°42′W
- Archipelago: Arctic Archipelago

Administration
- Canada
- Nunavut: Nunavut
- Region: Qikiqtaaluk

Demographics
- Population: Uninhabited
- Source: Saneruarsuk Islands at Atlas of Canada

The uninhabited Saneruarsuk Islands are members of the Arctic Archipelago in the territory of Nunavut. They are irregularly shaped, Baffin Island offshore islands, located in the Admiralty Inlet. Yeoman Island lies to their northwest.
