= Elwin Inlet =

Inlet in Nunavut, Canada

Coordinates: 73°28′N 084°00′W

Elwin Inlet is a body of water in Nunavut's Qikiqtaaluk Region, in Canada. It lies on the eastern side of the mouth of Admiralty Inlet, forming a border to Sirmilik National Park. To the south lie Baillarge Bay (15 km (9.3 mi)) and the hamlet of Arctic Bay (55 km (34 mi)).

The inlet and surrounds are characterized by steep cliffs of Ordovician origin. Harp seals, narwhals, polar bears, ringed seals, and white whales frequent the area, and it is also notable for one of the largest northern fulmar colonies in Canada.
