= Richard Peters =

Richard Peters may refer to:

- Richard Peters (priest) (1704–1776), Pennsylvania colonial minister,
- Richard Peters (judge) (1744–1828), also known as Richard Peters, Jr., Pennsylvania jurist, Continental Congressman, Continental Army official
- Richard Peters (reporter) (1780–1848), also known as Richard Peters, Jr., Reporter of Decisions to the U.S. Supreme Court
- Richard Peters (Atlanta) (1810–1889), founder of Atlanta, Georgia
- Richard Peters (clubman) (1848–1921), American railroad engineer
- Richard Peters (American football) (1920–1973), American football coach at Ottawa University
- Richard Stanley Peters (1919–2011), British philosopher
- Richard Peters (cricketer) (1911–1989), English cricketer
- Rick Peters (born 1966), American actor
- Ricky Peters (born 1955), baseball center fielder

== See also ==
- Richard Peter (1895–1977), German press photographer and photojournalist
- Richard Peter (Paralympian)
- Richard Peterson (disambiguation)
- Peter Richards (disambiguation)
