= Moffet Inlet =

Body of water in Nunavut, Canada

Moffet Inlet (Moffett Inlet, alternate name) (72°15′N 084°55′W) is a body of water in Nunavut's Qikiqtaaluk Region. It lies on the eastern side of Admiralty Inlet on Baffin Island's Borden Peninsula. The Inuit hamlet of Arctic Bay is located 105 km (65 miles) south/southeast of the inlet.

Bowhead whale, narwhal, and walrus frequent the area.

== History ==
The inlet was named after Flavien Moffet, an Ottawa newspaper owner who joined his friend, captain Joseph-Elzéar Bernier, on an Arctic expedition. In 1937, the Anglican Church built a mission at Moffet Inlet; it closed in 1947.
