= Baillarge Bay =

Bay in Nunavut, Canada

- Location in Nunavut
- Location: Admiralty Inlet
- Coordinates: 73°17′N 084°30′W
- Ocean/sea sources: Arctic Ocean
- Basin countries: Canada
- Surface area: 610 km^{2} (240 sq mi)
- Settlements: Uninhabited

Baillarge Bay is an Arctic waterway in the Qikiqtaaluk Region, Nunavut, Canada. It is the second waterway to press eastward from Admiralty Inlet into Baffin Island. The southern point of its mouth is named Ship Point.

== Geography ==
Characterized by open sea, coastal cliffs, and rocky marine shore habitat, the elevation rises up to 610 m (2,000 ft) above sea level.

== Fauna ==
The uninhabited bay is a Canadian Important Bird Area (#NU067) stretching 15 km (9.3 mi) up the coastline to Elwin Inlet. It is also an International Biological Program site (Region 9, #7-7) and Key Migratory Bird Terrestrial Habitat site (NU Site 19).

A sizeable population of northern fulmars are found here. Caribou, polar bears, and walruses, as well as harp seals, ringed seals, and beluga whales frequent the area.
