= Klaus Vondung =

Klaus Vondung (born 16 July 1941) is a German scholar in the fields of cultural and German studies. The focus of his academic work lies in the interplay of literature, politics and religion during the German Empire, Nazi Germany and beyond.

== Early life and education ==
Klaus Vondung was born in Ulm. He studied German, history, philosophy and politics at University of Tübingen and LMU Munich, where he passed the Staatsexamen during the winter semester of 1965/66. Three years later he received the Doctor of Philosophy (Dr. phil.) degree at LMU and spent the next two years as a lecturer. Having been granted a scholarship from the German Research Foundation, he spent two years of post-graduate research at Stanford University.

== Academic work as a professor ==
Following a habilitation about the more recent history of German literature, Klaus Vondung was appointed a professor of German studies and literature at the University of Siegen in 1976, a post which he held until becoming an emeritus in 2006. During his time in Siegen, he also served at times as dean and prorector (Vice President).

Vondung's academic research interests are expressed by the premise of the graduate school "Forms of Communication as Forms of Life", of which he was the speaker. Other scientific projects headed by him include "Turn of the millennium: Fears and Visions" (1998–2000, funded by the Volkswagen Foundation) and "Mysticism and Modernity" (as part of the larger "Key Issues of the Geisteswissenschaften").

During his academic career, Vondung was a guest professor at the universities of Florida, of Houston, and of Osaka, as well as Kwansei Gakuin University and Zhejiang University, the last one on unlimited terms.

== Bibliography ==
- Magie und Manipulation : ideologischer Kult und politische Religion des Nationalsozialismus. Göttingen: Vandenhoeck und Ruprecht. 1971.
- Völkisch-nationale und nationalsozialistische Literaturtheorie. München: List. 1973.
- Das wilhelminische Bildungsbürgertum. Zur Sozialgeschichte seiner Idden (Ed.) (1976)
- Kriegserlebnis. Der Erste Weltkrieg in der literarischen Gestaltung und symbolischen Deutung der Nationen (Ed.) (1980)
- Deutsche Literaturgeschichte: Neunzehntes Jahrhundert (1980)
  - Japanese translation: Nachizumu to Shukusai. Kokka shakai shugi no ideorogi teki saigi to seiji teki shukyo (1988)
- Die Apokalypse in Deutschland. München: dtv. 1988.
  - English translation: The Apocalypse in Germany (2000)
- Race and State. The Collected Works of Eric Voegelin. Vol. 2 (Ed.) (1997)
- The History of the Race Idea from Ray to Carus. The Collected Works of Eric Voegelin. Vol. 3 (Ed.) (1998)
- Anfang offen. Literarische Übergänge ins 21. Jahrhundert (2002)
- Jenseits der entzauberten Welt. Naturwissenschaft und Mystik in der Moderne (Ed.) (2006)
- Deutsche Wege zur Erlösung. Formen des Religiösen im Nationalsozialismus (2013)
  - English translation: Paths to Salvation. The National Socialist Religion (2019)
- Apokalypse ohne Ende (2018)
- The Pursuit of Unity and Perfection in History. (2020)
- Vom Verlangen nach Einheit und Vollkommenheit (2021)
- Verzückungen und Untergänge. Essays aus vier Jahrzehnten (2023)
- Begegnungen (2025)
