= Yeoman Island =

Uninhabited island in the Canadian Arctic

- Location within Nunavut Location within Canada

Geography
- Location: Northern Canada
- Coordinates: 72°13′N 85°47′W
- Archipelago: Arctic Archipelago

Administration
- Canada
- Territory: Nunavut
- Region: Qikiqtaaluk

Demographics
- Population: Uninhabited

Yeoman Island is an uninhabited member of the Arctic Archipelago in the territory of Nunavut. Located in Admiralty Inlet, it is an irregularly shaped Baffin Island offshore island. The Saneruarsuk Islands lie to its southeast.
