= Institutionalization (disambiguation) =

Institutionalization is a concept in sociology.

It may also refer to:

- Committing someone to a psychiatric hospital
- Having the institutional syndrome, the psychological and mental health effects of living for a long time in an institution or similar

== Music ==
- "Institutionalized" (song), a song on Suicidal Tendencies 1983 titular album
- "Institutionalized" (Kendrick Lamar song), 2015
- Institutionalized (album), a 2005 rap album by American rapper Ras Kass
  - Institutionalized Vol. 2, a 2008 follow up album

== See also ==
- Institution
- Institutionalized discrimination
