= Malte Herwig =

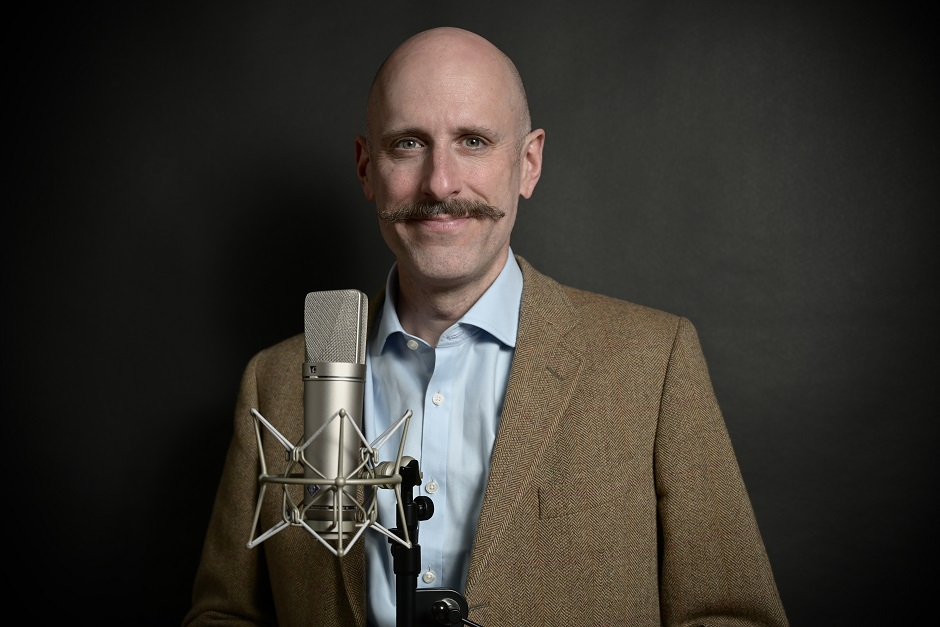
Malte Herwig on mic in 2022

Malte Herwig (born 2 October 1972) is a German-born author, journalist, and literary critic.

== Early life and education ==
Herwig was born in Kassel, Germany. He graduated from Friedrichsgymnasium in Kassel. Herwig studied literature, history, and political science at the University of Mainz, University of Oxford and Harvard University. From 2000 to 2003 he was a Fellow at Merton College at Oxford and in 2002 received his doctorate degree with a thesis on Thomas Mann called Bildungsbürger auf Abwegen: Naturwissenschaft im Werk Thomas Manns. In 2004, Herwig's dissertation won the first Thomas Mann Prize from the Thomas Mann Society in Lübeck.

== Career ==
Herwig's articles have appeared widely in U.S., British and German publications, including The New York Times, The Observer, Vanity Fair, Der Spiegel, Die Zeit, Süddeutsche Zeitung and Frankfurter Allgemeine Zeitung.

In 2008, Herwig was the first to publish some of Vladimir Nabokov's original index cards from the author's last unfinished novel The Original of Laura. In the accompanying article, Herwig concluded that "Laura", although fragmentary, was "vintage Nabokov". He is the author of several books, among them a biography of Austrian poet Peter Handke and a study of the greatest Nazi cover-up in post-war Germany, "Die Flakhelfer", which will be published in English in 2014.

Herwig is also known as an interviewer, whose empathetic but also sometimes confrontational style with stars like Michael Douglas, Charlotte Rampling and Rupert Everett has won acclaim. Douglas once chided Herwig for his "cheeky questions", when the journalist asked him if he'd ever have homosexual experiences. Herwig also conducted interviews with heads of government like former German chancellor Helmut Schmidt and nobel laureates like German writer Günter Grass.

Herwig was the only journalist to get an interview with former SS-Captain Erich Priebke, which he conducted in Priebke's flat in Rome shortly before the latter's death on 11 October 2013. Referring to Hannah Arendt's famous phrase about the Nazis when she covered the trial of Adolf Eichmann in Israel, The New York Times quoted Herwig as saying he wanted to use “the last chance to investigate that supposed banality of evil with a living person.”. Sensationally, the 100-year-old Priebke told Herwig he had renounced national socialism and deeply regretted his involvement in war crimes.

== Selected works and publications ==
=== Monographs ===
- Herwig, Malte Christian Walter (2004). Bildungsbürger auf Abwegen: Naturwissenschaft im Werk Thomas Manns. Frankfurt am Main: V. Klostermann. ISBN 978-3-465-03352-3.
- Herwig, Malte (2005). Eliten in einer egalitären Welt (1. Aufl ed.). Berlin: wjs Verl. ISBN 978-3-937989-11-2.
- Herwig, Malte Christian Walter (2011). Meister der Dämmerung: Peter Handke: eine Biographie (1. Aufl ed.). München: Deutsche Verlags-Anstalt. ISBN 978-3-421-04449-5.
- Herwig, Malte Christian Walter (2013). Die Flakhelfer: wie aus Hitlers jüngsten Parteimitgliedern Deutschlands führende Demokraten wurden (1. Auflage ed.). München: Deutsche Verlags-Anstalt. ISBN 978-3-421-04556-0.
- Herwig, Malte (2024). Austrian Psycho: Jack Unterweger. Wien: Molden. ISBN 978-3-222-15112-5.

=== Selected articles ===
- Herwig, Malte (22 January 2006). "'Hitler? He was good in parts'". The Observer.
- Herwig, Malte (25 September 2006). "Sex for Sexagenarians: Movies Target Frisky Seniors". Der Spiegel (in German).
- Herwig, Malte (29 December 2006). "SPIEGEL Interview With British Author Frederick Forsyth: "They Take The Mind, and What Emerges is Just Tapioca Pudding"". Der Spiegel (in German).
- Herwig, Malte (28 March 2007). "Google's Total Library: Putting The World's Books On The Web". Der Spiegel (in German).
- Herwig, Malte; Beier, Lars-Olav (2 July 2007). "Opinion: Much Ado About Tom Cruise". Der Spiegel (in German).
- Herwig, Malte (24 August 2007). "Still Life: The Jailhouse Jackson Pollock". Der Spiegel (in German).
- Herwig, Malte (November 21, 2008). "In North Korea, Communism goes Cannes". The New York Times.
