= Peter Richards Islands =

Island group in Nunavut, Canada

- Location within Nunavut Location within Canada

Geography
- Location: Northern Canada
- Coordinates: 72°45′N 85°58′W
- Archipelago: Arctic Archipelago

Administration
- Canada
- Territory: Nunavut
- Region: Qikiqtaaluk

Demographics
- Population: Uninhabited

The Peter Richards Islands (Qikiqtatannak) are members of the Arctic Archipelago in the territory of Nunavut. They are located in Baffin Island's Admiralty Inlet.
