= Bildung =

German tradition of self-cultivation

Bildung (German: [ˈbɪldʊŋ], "education", "formation", etc.) refers to the German tradition of self-cultivation, the development and formation of the human mind through education and cultural maturation. This maturation is a harmonization of the individual's mind and heart and in a unification of selfhood and identity within the broader society, as evidenced with the literary tradition of Bildungsroman.

== History ==
The process of harmonization of mind, heart, selfhood and identity is achieved through personal transformation, which presents a challenge to the individual's accepted beliefs. In Hegel's writings, the challenge of personal growth often involves an agonizing alienation from one's "natural consciousness" that leads to a reunification and development of the self. Similarly, although social unity requires well-formed institutions, it also requires a diversity of individuals with the freedom (in the positive sense of the term) to develop a wide-variety of talents and abilities and this requires personal agency. However, rather than an end state, both individual and social unification is a process that is driven by unrelenting negations.

In this sense, education involves the shaping of the human being with regard to their own humanity as well as their innate intellectual skills. So, the term refers to a process of becoming that can be related to a process of becoming within existentialism.

The term Bildung also corresponds to the Humboldtian model of higher education from the work of Prussian philosopher and educational administrator Wilhelm von Humboldt (1767–1835). Thus, in this context, the concept of education becomes a lifelong process of human development, rather than mere training in gaining certain external knowledge or skills. Such training in skills is known by the German words Erziehung, and Ausbildung. Bildung in contrast is seen as a process wherein an individual's spiritual and cultural sensibilities as well as life, personal and social skills are in process of continual expansion and growth. Bildung is seen as a way to become more free due to higher self-reflection. Von Humboldt wrote with respect to Bildung:

Education [Bildung], truth and virtue must be disseminated to such an extent that the "concept of mankind" takes on a great and dignified form in each individual.

However, this can only be achieved personally by each individual, who must

absorb the great mass of material offered to him by the world around him and by his inner existence, using all the possibilities of his receptiveness; he must then reshape that material with all the energies of his own activity and appropriate it to himself so as to create an interaction between his own personality and nature in a most general, active and harmonious form.

Most explicitly in Hegel's writings, the Bildung tradition rejects the pre-Kantian metaphysics of being for a post-Kantian metaphysics of experience. Much of Hegel's writings were about the nature of education (both Bildung and Erziehung), reflecting his own role as a teacher and administrator in German secondary schools, and in his more general writings. More recently, Gadamer and McDowell have used the concept in their writings.

== See also ==
- Bildungsbürgertum
- Coming of age
- Cultural literacy
- Etiquette
- General knowledge
- High culture
- Manners
- Prudence
- Wisdom
