= Louise Archer (sociologist) =

British academic

Louise Archer Ker OBE FBA FAcSS (born 1973, and known professionally as Louise Archer) is Karl Mannheim Professor of Sociology of Education at the University College London Institute of Education.

In October 2017 she was elected a Fellow of the Academy of Social Sciences, and a Fellow of the British Academy in 2023.

Archer had a founding role in the development of the Athena SWAN Charter, an equality charter mark framework and accreditation scheme for higher education and research institutions in the UK, established in 2005. She is a member of the Women in Tech Taskforce, a national effort to ensure women can enter, thrive, and lead across the UK’s tech sector.

She is the daughter of the engineer Professor John Archer, former Vice-Chancellor and Principal of Heriot-Watt University from 1997 to 2006.
