= Richard A. Peterson (sociologist) =

American sociologist

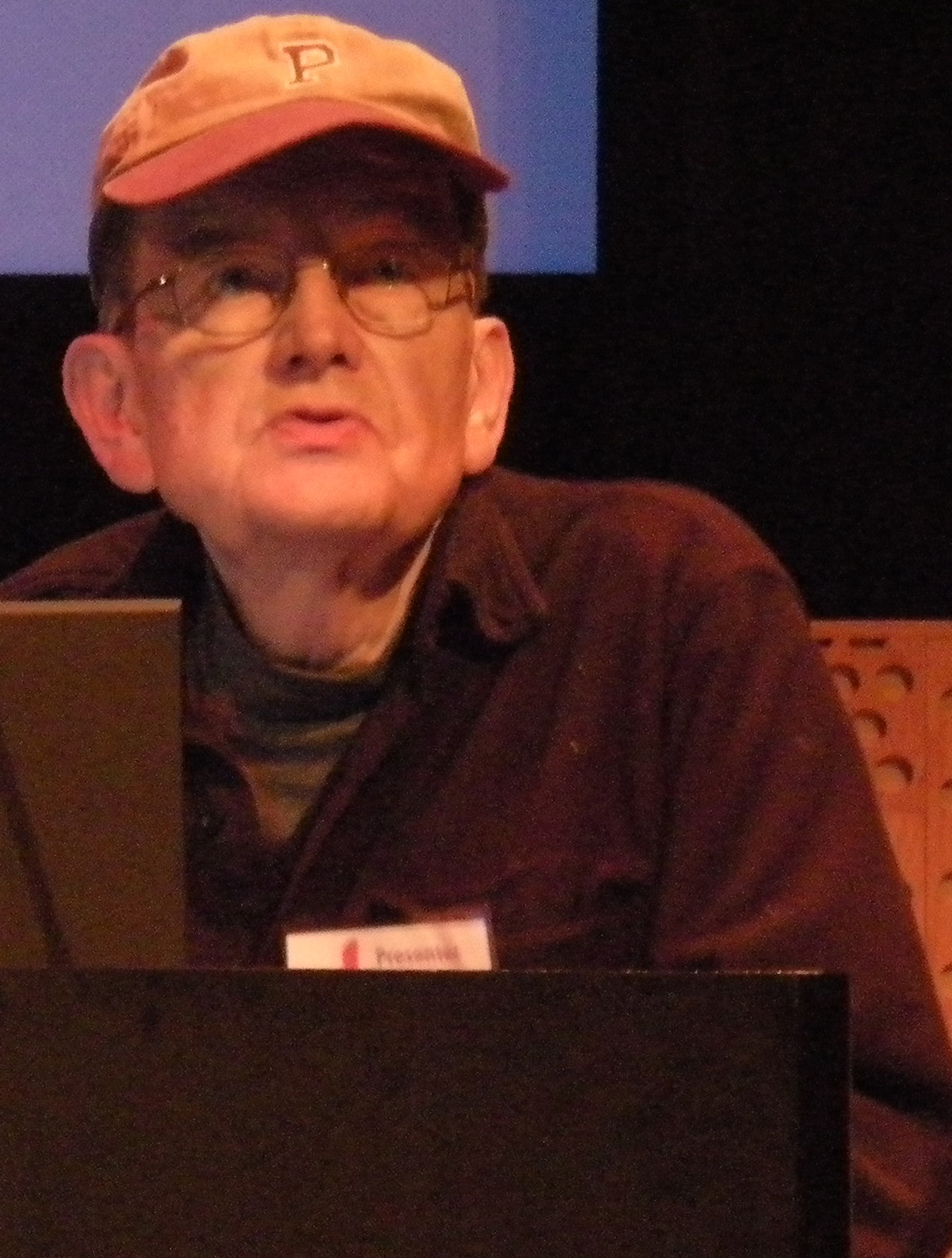
- Pete Peterson in 2008.
- Born: Richard Austin Peterson; September 28, 1932; Mussoorie, British India
- Died: February 4, 2010 (aged 77); Nashville, Tennessee
- Education: Oberlin College (B.A.) University of Illinois (Ph.D.)
- Known for: sociology of culture, sociology of music
- Scientific career
- Fields: Sociology
- Workplaces: Vanderbilt University
- Academic advisors: Alvin Gouldner

Richard Austin Peterson (September 28, 1932 – February 4, 2010) was an American sociologist and emeritus Professor of Sociology at Vanderbilt University.

== Early life and education ==
Richard Peterson was born in Mussoorie, British India, where his father was a missionary. He graduated from Oberlin College with a bachelor's, and attended graduate school at the University of Illinois at Urbana–Champaign, where he worked with the sociologist Alvin Gouldner and completed his PhD in 1962 In 1965, Peterson received a job in the sociology department at Vanderbilt University in Nashville, Tennessee. It was there that he began to study the country music scene in-depth.

He was the founding chairman of the American Sociological Association's culture section, and the section's prize for the best graduate student paper is named in honor of him. He was a major contributor to the "production of culture" perspective within the sociology of culture, and a widely known scholar of popular music, country-western in particular. Peterson's highly cited book Creating Country Music: Fabricating Authenticity "is one of the most important scholarly works ever written about the genre".

The journal Poetics released a special double issue devoted to the contributions of Peterson to the sociology of culture.

== Works ==
- Peterson, R.A. and Simkus, A. (1992) 'How Musical Tastes Mark Occupational Status Groups', in M. Lamont and M. Fournier (eds) Cultivating Differences, pp 152–86. Chicago: University of Chicago Press.
- Peterson, Richard A. (August 1992). "Understanding audience segmentation: From elite and mass to omnivore and univore". Poetics. 21 (4): 243–258. doi:10.1016/0304-422X(92)90008-Q.
- Peterson, Richard A.; Kern, Roger M. (October 1996). "Changing Highbrow Taste: From Snob to Omnivore". American Sociological Review. 61 (5): 900–909. doi:10.2307/2096460. JSTOR 2096460.
- Peterson, Richard A. (November 1997). "Changing representation of status through taste displays: An introduction". Poetics. 25 (2–3): 71–73. doi:10.1016/S0304-422X(97)00012-0.
- Peterson, R.A. (2005) 'Problems in Comparative Research: The Example of Omnivorousness', Poetics 33(5–6): 257—82 .

.
