= Education sciences =

Study of education policy and practice

Education sciences, also known as education studies or education theory, and traditionally called pedagogy, seek to describe, understand, and prescribe education including education policy. Subfields include comparative education, educational research, instructional theory, curriculum theory and psychology, philosophy, sociology, economics, and history of education. Related are learning theory or cognitive science.

== History ==
The earliest known attempts to understand education in Europe were by classical Greek philosophers and sophists, but there is also evidence of contemporary (or even preceding) discussions among Arabic, Indian, and Chinese scholars.

== Foundations of education ==
Foundations of Education is an interdisciplinary field within education concerned with the intellectual, historical, social, political, economic, and legal foundations of education and educational institutions. The field draws on disciplines including philosophy of education, history of education, sociology of education, political science, economics, and law to examine the nature, purposes, functions, and social contexts of education.

Foundations of education is studied in universities under names such as Foundations of Education and Educational Foundations, and may encompass areas such as educational philosophy, history, sociology, policy, economics, governance, and educational law. The composition of the field varies among institutions and academic programs, reflecting its interdisciplinary character.

== Philosophy of education ==
Educational thought is not necessarily concerned with the construction of theories as much as the "reflective examination of educational issues and problems from the perspective of diverse disciplines."

For example, a cultural theory of education considers how education occurs through the totality of culture, including prisons, households, and religious institutions as well as schools. Other examples are the behaviorist theory of education that comes from educational psychology and the functionalist theory of education that comes from sociology of education.

=== Normative theories of education ===
Normative theories of education provide the norms, goals, and standards of education. In contrast, descriptive theories of education provide descriptions, explanations or predictions of the processes of education.

"Normative philosophies or theories of education may make use of the results of [philosophical thought] and of factual inquiries about human beings and the psychology of learning, but in any case they propound views about what education should be, what dispositions it should cultivate, why it ought to cultivate them, how and in whom it should do so, and what forms it should take. In a full-fledged philosophical normative theory of education, besides analysis of the sorts described, there will normally be propositions of the following kinds: 1. Basic normative premises about what is good or right; 2. Basic factual premises about humanity and the world; 3. Conclusions, based on these two kinds of premises, about the dispositions education should foster; 4. Further factual premises about such things as the psychology of learning and methods of teaching; and 5. Further conclusions about such things as the methods that education should use."

Examples of the purpose of schools include: to develop reasoning about perennial questions, to master the methods of scientific inquiry, to cultivate the intellect, to create change agents, to develop spirituality, and to model a democratic society.

Common educational philosophies include: educational perennialism, educational progressivism, educational essentialism, critical pedagogy, Montessori education, Waldorf education, and democratic education.

=== Normative curriculum theory ===
Normative theories of curriculum aim to "describe, or set norms, for conditions surrounding many of the concepts and constructs" that define curriculum. These normative propositions differ from those above in that normative curriculum theory is not necessarily untestable. A central question asked by normative curriculum theory is: given a particular educational philosophy, what is worth knowing and why? Some examples are: a deep understanding of the Great Books, direct experiences driven by student interest, a superficial understanding of a wide range knowledge (e.g. Core knowledge), social and community problems and issues, knowledge and understanding specific to cultures and their achievements (e.g. African-Centered Education).

=== Normative feminist educational theory ===
Scholars such as Robyn Wiegman argue that, "academic feminism is perhaps the most successful institutionalizing project of its generation, with more full-time faculty positions and new doctoral degree programs emerging each year in the field it inaugurated, Women's Studies". Feminist educational theory stems from four key tenets, supported by empirical data based on surveys of feminist educators. The first tenet of feminist educational theory is, "Creation of participatory classroom communities". Participatory classroom communities often are smaller classes built around discussion and student involvement. The second tenet is, "Validation of personal experience". Classrooms in which validation of personal experience occur often are focused around students providing their own insights and experiences in group discussion, rather than relying exclusively on the insight of the educator. The third tenet is, "Encouragement of social understanding and activism". This tenet is generally actualized by classrooms discussing and reading about social and societal aspects that students may not be aware of, along with breeding student self-efficacy. The fourth and final tenet of feminist education is, "Development of critical thinking skills/open-mindedness". Classrooms actively engaging in this tenet encourage students to think for themselves and prompt them to move beyond their comfort zones, working outside the bounds of the traditional lecture-based classroom. Though these tenets at times overlap, they combine to provide the basis for modern feminist educational theory, and are supported by a majority of feminist educators.

Feminist educational theory derives from the feminist movement, particularly that of the early 1970s, which prominent feminist bell hooks describes as, "a movement to end sexism, sexist exploitation, and oppression". Academic feminist Robyn Weigman recalls that, "In the early seventies, feminism in the U.S. academy was less an organized entity than a set of practices: an ensemble of courses listed on bulletin boards often taught for free by faculty and community leaders". While feminism traditionally existed outside of the institutionalization of schools (particularly universities), feminist education has gradually taken hold in the last few decades and has gained a foothold in institutionalized educational bodies. "Once fledgling programs have become departments, and faculty have been hired and tenured with full-time commitments".

There are supporters of feminist education as well, many of whom are educators or students. Professor Becky Ropers-Huilman recounts one of her positive experiences with feminist education from the student perspective, explaining that she "...felt very 'in charge' of [her] own learning experiences," and "...was not being graded–or degraded... [while completing] the majority of the assigned work for the class (and additional work that [she] thought would add to class discussion)," all while "...[regarding] the teacher's feedback on [her] participation as one perspective, rather than the perspective". Ropers-Huilman experienced a working feminist classroom that successfully motivated students to go above and beyond, succeeding in generating self-efficacy and caring in the classroom. When Ropers-Huilman became a teacher herself, she embraced feminist educational theory, noting that, "[Teachers] have an obligation as the ones who are vested with an assumed power, even if that power is easily and regularly disrupted, to assess and address the effects that it is having in our classrooms". Ropers-Huilman firmly believes that educators have a duty to address feminist concepts such as the use and flow of power within the classroom, and strongly believes in the potential of feminist educational theory to create positive learning experiences for students and teachers as she has personally experienced.

Ropers-Huilman also celebrates the feminist classroom's inclusivity, noting that in a feminist classroom, "in which power is used to care about, for, and with others… educational participants can shape practices aimed at creating an inclusive society that discovers and utilizes the potential of its actors". Ropers-Huilman believes that a feminist classroom carries the ability to greatly influence the society as a whole, promoting understanding, caring, and inclusivity. Ropers-Huilman actively engages in feminist education in her classes, focusing on concepts such as active learning and critical thinking while attempting to demonstrate and engage in caring behavior and atypical classroom settings, similar to many other feminist educators.

Leading feminist scholar bell hooks argues for the incorporation of feminism into all aspects of society, including education, in her book Feminism is for Everybody. hooks notes that, "Everything [people] know about feminism has come into their lives thirdhand". hooks believes that education offers a counter to the, "...wrongminded notion of feminist movement which implied it was anti-male". hooks cites feminism's negative connotations as major inhibitors to the spread and adoption of feminist ideologies. However, feminist education has seen tremendous growth in adoption in the past few decades, despite the negative connotations of its parent movement.

==== Criticism of feminist educational theory ====
Opposition to feminist educational theory comes from both those who oppose feminism in general and feminists who oppose feminist educational theory in particular. Critics of feminist educational theory argue against the four basic tenets of the theory, "...[contesting] both their legitimacy and their implementation". Lewis Lehrman particularly describes feminist educational ideology as, "...'therapeutic pedagogy' that substitutes an 'overriding' (and detrimental) value on participatory interaction for the expertise of the faculty" (Hoffman). Lehrman argues that the feminist educational tenets of participatory experience and validation of person experience hinder education by limiting and inhibiting the educator's ability to share his or her knowledge, learned through years of education and experience.

Others challenge the legitimacy of feminist educational theory, arguing that it is not unique and is instead a sect of liberatory education. Even feminist educational scholars such as Frances Hoffmann and Jayne Stake are forced to concede that, "feminist pedagogy shared intellectual and political roots with the movements comprising the liberatory education agenda of the past 30 years". These liberatory attempts at the democratization of classrooms demonstrate a growth in liberatory education philosophy that some argue feminist educational theory simply piggybacks off of.

The harshest critiques of feminist educational theory often come from feminists themselves. Feminist scholar Robyn Wiegman argues against feminist education in her article "Academic Feminism against Itself", arguing that feminist educational ideology has abandoned the intersectionality of feminism in many cases, and has also focused exclusively on present content with a singular perspective. Wiegman refers to feminist scholar James Newman's arguments, centered around the idea that, "When we fail... to challenge both students and ourselves to theorize alterity as an issue of change over time as well as of geographic distance, ethnic difference, and sexual choice, we repress... not only the 'thickness' of historical difference itself, but also... our (self) implication in a narrative of progress whose hero(in)es inhabit only the present". Newman (and Wiegman) believe that this presentist ideology imbued within modern academic feminism creates an environment breeding antifeminist ideologies, most importantly an abandonment of the study of difference, integral to feminist ideology. Wiegman believes that feminist educational theory does a great disservice to the feminist movement, while failing to instill the critical thinking and social awareness that feminist educational theory is intended to.

== Educational anthropology ==
Philosophical anthropology is the philosophical study of human nature. In terms of learning, examples of descriptive theories of the learner are: a mind, soul, and spirit capable of emulating the Absolute Mind (Idealism); an orderly, sensing, and rational being capable of understanding the world of things (Realism), a rational being with a soul modeled after God and who comes to know God through reason and revelation (Neo-Thomism), an evolving and active being capable of interacting with the environment (Pragmatism), a fundamentally free and individual being who is capable of being authentic through the making of and taking responsibility for choices (Existentialism). Philosophical concepts for the process of education include Bildung and paideia. Educational anthropology is a sub-field of anthropology and is widely associated with the pioneering work of George Spindler. As the name would suggest, the focus of educational anthropology is obviously on education, although an anthropological approach to education tends to focus on the cultural aspects of education, including informal as well as formal education. As education involves understandings of who we are, it is not surprising that the single most recognized dictum of educational anthropology is that the field is centrally concerned with cultural transmission. Cultural transmission involves the transfer of a sense of identity between generations, sometimes known as enculturation and also transfer of identity between cultures, sometimes known as acculturation. Accordingly, thus it is also not surprising that educational anthropology has become increasingly focused on ethnic identity and ethnic change.

== Descriptive curriculum theory ==
Descriptive theories of curriculum explain how curricula "benefit or harm all publics it touches".

The term hidden curriculum describes that which is learned simply by being in a learning environment. For example, a student in a teacher-led classroom is learning submission. The hidden curriculum is not necessarily intentional.

== Instructional theory ==
Instructional theories focus on the methods of instruction for teaching curricula. Theories include the methods of: autonomous learning, coyote teaching, inquiry-based instruction, lecture, maturationism, socratic method, outcome-based education, taking children seriously, transformative learning

== Educational psychology ==
Educational psychology is an empirical science that provides descriptive theories of how people learn. Examples of theories of education in psychology are: constructivism, behaviorism, cognitivism, and motivational theory

=== Cognitive science ===
Cognitive science is the interdisciplinary, scientific study of the mind and its processes. It examines the nature, the tasks, and the functions of cognition (in a broad sense). Mental faculties of concern to cognitive scientists include perception, memory, attention, reasoning, language, and emotion. To understand these faculties, cognitive scientists borrow from fields such as psychology, philosophy, artificial intelligence, neuroscience, linguistics, and anthropology. The typical analysis of cognitive science spans many levels of organization, from learning and decision-making to logic and planning; from neural circuitry to modular brain organization. One of the fundamental concepts of cognitive science is that "thinking can best be understood in terms of representational structures in the mind and computational procedures that operate on those structures."

== Educational neuroscience ==
Educational neuroscience is an emerging field that brings together researchers in diverse disciplines to explore the interactions between biological processes and education.

== Sociology of education ==
The sociology of education is the study of how public institutions and individual experiences affect education and its outcomes. It is most concerned with the public schooling systems of modern industrial societies, including the expansion of higher, further, adult, and continuing education. Examples of theories of education from sociology include: functionalism, conflict theory, social efficiency, and social mobility.

== Teaching method ==
A teaching method is a set of principles and methods used by teachers to enable student learning. These strategies are determined partly by the subject matter to be taught, partly by the relative expertise of the learners, and partly by constraints caused by the learning environment. For a particular teaching method to be appropriate and efficient it has to take into account the learner, the nature of the subject matter, and the type of learning it is supposed to bring about.

== Learning theories ==
Learning theory attempts to describe how students receive, process, and retain knowledge during learning. Cognitive, emotional, and environmental influences, as well as prior experience, all play a part in how understanding, or a worldview, is acquired or changed and knowledge and skills retained.

== Educational research ==
Educational research refers to the systematic collection and analysis of evidence and data related to the field of education. Research may involve a variety of methods and aspects of education including student learning, interaction, teaching methods, teacher training, and classroom dynamics.

== Educational assessment ==
Educational assessment or educational evaluation is the systematic process of documenting and using empirical data on the knowledge, skill, attitudes, aptitude and beliefs to refine programs and improve student learning. Assessment data can be obtained by examining student work directly to assess the achievement of learning outcomes or it is based on data from which one can make inferences about learning. Assessment is often used interchangeably with test but is not limited to tests. Assessment can focus on the individual learner, the learning community (class, workshop, or other organized group of learners), a course, an academic program, the institution, or the educational system as a whole (also known as granularity). The word "assessment" came into use in an educational context after the Second World War.

=== Educational evaluation ===
Educational evaluation is the evaluation process of characterizing and appraising some aspect/s of an educational process.

=== Educational aims and objectives ===
Although the noun forms of the three words aim, objective and goal are often used synonymously, professionals in organised education define the educational aims and objectives more narrowly and consider them to be distinct from each other: aims are concerned with purpose whereas objectives are concerned with achievement.

== Education economics ==
Education economics or the economics of education is the study of economic issues relating to education, including the demand for education, the financing and provision of education, and the comparative efficiency of various educational programs and policies. From early works on the relationship between schooling and labor market outcomes for individuals, the field of the economics of education has grown rapidly to cover virtually all areas with linkages to education.

== Comparative education ==
Comparative education is a discipline in the social sciences which entails the scrutiny and evaluation of different educational systems, such as those in various countries. Professionals in this area of endeavor are absorbed in advancing evocative terminologies and guidelines for education worldwide, enhancing educational structures and producing a context to which the success and effectivity of education programs and initiatives can be assessed.

== Educational theorists ==
- List of educational psychologists

== See also ==
- Anti-schooling activism
- Classical education movement
- Cognitivism (learning theory)
- Andragogy
- Geragogy
- Humanistic education
- International education
- Peace education
- Movement in learning
- Co-construction, collaborative learning
- Scholarship of teaching and learning
