= List of cemeteries in Kansas =

This is a listing of cemeteries in the U.S. state of Kansas.

== U.S. National Cemeteries ==
Kansas has three United States National Cemeteries which are all administered by the United States Department of Veterans Affairs and overseen from the Leavenworth National Cemetery. They were added to the National Register of Historic Places in 1999.

Cemetery	Year	Size	Locality	County	Description	Photograph (click image to enlarge)
Fort Leavenworth National Cemetery	1862	36.1 acres (146,000 m^{2})	Fort Leavenworth	Leavenworth	Used as a burial ground as early as 1844, the cemetery has almost 23,000 interments. It is located near the center of the Fort Leavenworth Military Reservation. The cemetery has two large grave-markers that look like monuments for General Henry Leavenworth and Colonel Edward Hatch.	Fort Leavenworth National Cemetery
Fort Scott National Cemetery	1862	21.8 acres (88,000 m^{2})	Fort Scott	Bourbon	Originally named Presbyterian Graveyard when the land was purchased and maintained by the Presbyterian Church in 1861, the cemetery is the site of about 6,000 interments. It is located on the eastern outskirts of the city of Fort Scott. A granite monument was erected in 1984 in memory of the 1st Kansas Colored Volunteer Infantry.	
Leavenworth National Cemetery	1973	128.8 acres (0.521 km^{2})	Leavenworth	Leavenworth	Located in southeast Leavenworth, the cemetery was designed concurrent to construction of the first buildings of the National Home for Disabled Volunteer Soldiers, and the first interment occurred in 1886. A limestone obelisk monument, dedicated in 1919, sits atop the crest of a hill in the highest ridge of the cemetery overlooking the Missouri River valley. The cemetery has more than 31,000 interments.	

== Other cemeteries ==
Cemetery	Locality	County	Description	Photograph (click image to enlarge)
Huron Cemetery	Kansas City	Wyandotte	Established around 1843 and now known formally as the Wyandot National Burying Ground.	
Little Walnut Glencoe Township Cemetery	Between Leon and Beaumont	Butler	A small rural cemetery, go east on Highway 400 past Leon and before Beaumont, go north on S.E. Grey Road towards Rosalia	
Oakwood Cemetery	Parsons	Labette	The cemetery contains several Civil War memorials.	
Old Mission Cemetery	Wichita	Sedgwick	The Mausoleum located at the cemetery is on the National Register of Historic Places	
Stull Cemetery	Stull	Douglas	A cemetery that has a reputation for being a gateway to Hell and a place that The Devil reportedly haunts.	
America City Cemetery	Near Havensville	Nemaha		
Boy's Industrial School Cemetery	Topeka	Shawnee	Originally named the State Reform School and later the State Industrial School for Boys, at Topeka. A small cemetery containing the remains of 12 youths.	
Vieux Family Cemetery	Louisville	Pottawatomie	A small family cemetery along the Oregon Trail where Louis Vieux ran a river crossing.	
Oak Hill Cemetery	Lawrence	Douglas	Quantrill raid victims, Langston Hughes' grandparents, and many war veterans; once called by William Allen White the "Kansas Arlington"	
Simerwell Cemetery	Near Auburn	Shawnee	A rural cemetery where the first white female born in Kansas is buried.	
Sunset Cemetery	Manhattan	Riley	Governor Nehemiah Green, Earl Woods, Samuel Wendell Williston, Solon Toothaker Kimball	

== See also ==
- List of cemeteries in the United States
- List of national cemeteries by country
