= Co-construction =

Co-construction may refer to:

- Co-construction (linguistics), a grammatical or semantic entity which has been uttered by more than one speaker
- Co-construction (learning), a distinctive approach to learning, where the emphasis is on collaborative, or partnership working
