= Enculturation =

Process of acquiring values from a neighboring culture

Enculturation is the process by which people learn the dynamics of their surrounding culture and acquire values and norms appropriate or necessary to that culture and its worldviews.

== Definition and history of research ==
The term enculturation was used first by sociologist of science Harry Collins to describe one of the models whereby scientific knowledge is communicated among scientists. The ingredients discussed by Collins for enculturation are

1. Learning by Immersion: whereby aspiring scientists learn by engaging in the daily activities of the laboratory, interacting with other scientists, and participating in experiments and discussions.
2. Tacit Knowledge: highlighting the importance of tacit knowledge—knowledge that is not easily codified or written down but is acquired through experience and practice.
3. Socialization: where individuals learn the social norms, values, and behaviours expected within the scientific community.
4. Language and Discourse: Scientists must become fluent in the terminology, theoretical frameworks, and modes of argumentation specific to their discipline.
5. Community Membership: recognition of the individual as a legitimate member of the scientific community.

The problem tackled in the article of Harry Collins was the early experiments for the detection of gravitational waves.

Collins defines the enculturation model by contrast with what he calls the algorithmical model:

The algorithmical model encourages the view that formal communication can carry a complete recipe for experiment with all that follows. It encourages the view that the formalized accounts of scientific work found in the journals are complete accounts […] By contrast [...] the 'enculturational model' - is the acquisition of skill as opposed to formal instruction. The locus of knowledge is not the written word or symbol but the community of expert practitioners (this includes communities of theorists). Individuals' knowledge must be acquired by contact with the relevant community rather than by transferring programmes of instruction.

Enculturation is mostly studied in sociology and anthropology. The influences that limit, direct, or shape the individual (whether deliberately or not) include parents, other adults, and peers. If successful, enculturation results in competence in the language, values, and rituals of the culture. Growing up, everyone goes through their own version of enculturation. Enculturation helps form an individual into an acceptable citizen. Culture impacts everything that an individual does, regardless of whether they know about it. Enculturation is a deep-rooted process that binds together individuals. Even as a culture undergoes changes, elements such as central convictions, values, perspectives, and young raising practices remain similar. Enculturation paves way for tolerance which is highly needed for peaceful co-habitance.

The process of enculturation, most commonly discussed in the field of anthropology, is closely related to socialization, a concept central to the field of sociology. Both roughly describe the adaptation of an individual into social groups by absorbing the ideas, beliefs and practices surrounding them. In some disciplines, socialization refers to the deliberate shaping of the individual. As such, the term may cover both deliberate and informal enculturation.

The process of learning and absorbing culture need not be social, direct or conscious. Cultural transmission can occur in various forms, though the most common social methods include observing other individuals, being taught or being instructed. Less obvious mechanisms include learning one's culture from the media, the information environment and various social technologies, which can lead to cultural transmission and adaptation across societies. A good example of this is the diffusion of hip-hop culture into states and communities beyond its American origins.

Enculturation has often been studied in the context of non-immigrant African Americans.

Conrad Phillip Kottak (in Window on Humanity) writes:

Enculturation is the process where the culture that is currently established teaches an individual the accepted norms and values of the culture or society where the individual lives. The individual can become an accepted member and fulfill the needed functions and roles of the group. Most importantly the individual knows and establishes a context of boundaries and accepted behavior that dictates what is acceptable and not acceptable within the framework of that society. It teaches the individual their role within society as well as what is accepted behavior within that society and lifestyle.

Enculturation is referred to as acculturation in some academic literature. However, more recent literature has signalled a difference in meaning between the two. Whereas enculturation describes the process of learning one's own culture, acculturation denotes learning a different culture, for example, that of a host. The latter can be linked to ideas of a culture shock, which describes an emotionally-jarring disconnect between one's old and new culture cues.

Famously, the sociologist Talcott Parsons once described children as "barbarians" of a sort, since they are fundamentally uncultured.

== How enculturation occurs ==
When minorities come into the U.S., these people might fully associate with their racial legacy prior to taking part in processing enculturation. Enculturation can happen in several ways. Direct education implies that one's family, instructors, or different individuals from the general public unequivocally show one certain convictions, esteems, or anticipated standards of conduct. Parents may play a vital role in teaching their children standard behavior for their culture, including table manners and some aspects of polite social interactions. Strict familial and societal teaching, which often uses different forms of positive and negative reinforcement to shape behavior, can lead a person to adhere closely to their religious convictions and customs. Schools also provide a formal setting to learn national values, such as honoring a country's flag, national anthem, and other significant patriotic symbols.

Participatory learning occurs as individuals take an active role of interacting with their environment and culture. Through their own engagement in meaningful activities, they learn socio-cultural norms for their area and may adopt related qualities and values. For example, if a school organizes an outing to gather trash at a public park, this action assists with ingraining the upsides of regard for nature and ecological protection. Strict customs frequently stress participatory learning – for example, kids who take part in the singing of psalms during Christmas will assimilate the qualities and practices of the occasion.

Observational learning is when knowledge is gained essentially by noticing and emulating others. As much as an individual related to a model accepts that emulating the model will prompt good results and feels that one is fit for mimicking the way of behaving, learning can happen with no unequivocal instruction. For example, a youngster who is sufficiently fortunate to be brought into the world by guardians in a caring relationship will figure out how to be tender and mindful in their future connections.

== See also ==
- Civil society
- Dual inheritance theory
- Education
- Educational anthropology
- Ethnocentrism
- Indoctrination
- Intercultural competence
- Mores
- Norm (philosophy)
- Norm (sociology)
- Peer pressure
- Transculturation
