= Sunset Cemetery =

Cemetery in Manhattan, Kansas, USA

- Interactive map of Sunset Cemetery

Details
- Established: 1860
- Location: Manhattan, Kansas
- Country: United States
- Coordinates: 39°10′53″N 96°35′33″W
- Type: Municipal
- Owned by: City of Manhattan
- Size: 45 acres (180,000 m^{2})
- No. of graves: 14,000
- Website: cityofmhk.com/299/Cemeteries
- Find a Grave: Sunset Cemetery
- The Political Graveyard: Sunset Cemetery

Sunset Cemetery, located at 2000 Leavenworth Street in Manhattan, Kansas, is the oldest cemetery in the city and is one of two cemeteries owned by the city.

== History ==
Manhattan was founded in 1855 and incorporated in 1857. A committee was formed for the creation of a cemetery according to the city council minutes of July 5, 1858. This committee failed in its task and a second committee was appointed on June 9, 1859. The committee recommended in April 1860 the purchase of land claimed by John Flagg, but this recommendation was not accepted by the city council. A third cemetery committee was appointed and it reported on April 18, 1860 that an agreement had not been reached by the members. A fourth cemetery committee was appointed on June 16, 1860. The land chosen by the fourth committee was claimed by Clark M. Lewis, but he could not provide clear title. In August 1860, Lewis transferred the recommended land to John Pipher with the condition that he should give a warranty deed for the land to the city. Pipher sold 35 acres (140,000 m^{2}) acres to the city in August 1860 for $610.

The first block plotted into burial lots lies in the northeast corner of the cemetery. The layout of blocks continued westward until 1900 when the burial lots reached a significant ravine. The city offered a contest prize of $10 to anyone who could offer a suitable layout for the land on the west side of the ravine. No records exist noting the payment of the prize

In 1901, Benjamin F. Miller deeded an additional 8 acres (32,000 m^{2}) to the city in his will. This land was north of the northeast corner and designated for cemetery purposes only. In 1929, Manhattan residents approved a bond vote for $12,000 to purchase 57 acres (230,000 m^{2}) from Delmar Wickham.

The first grave is not officially recorded, but tradition claims that it was Juliet Whitehorn, who died of typhoid fever in November 1860.

The first superintendent was Charles Barnes, who was appointed July 6, 1863 and salaried at $25 per year.

Most of Manhattan's early settlers, business owners, and politicians are buried in Sunset Cemetery. A large number of the early faculty members of Kansas State Agricultural College (now Kansas State University) are interred there as well.

A small portion of cemetery land lies outside of the walls to the east. This land contains the sexton's home and office, as well as Denison Circle, a granite boulder monument recognizing the contributions of the first KSAC President Joseph J. Denison and Manhattan's earliest settlers.

Presently, interments are continuing, but all lots have been sold. The city created Sunrise Cemetery 80 acres (320,000 m^{2}), located at 2901 Stagg Hill Road, which is actively receiving interments.

== Notable interments ==
Notable interments at Sunrise Cemetery
Name	Place of birth	Date of birth	Occupation	Place of death	Date of death	Notes and References
John H. Callahan	Shelby County, Kentucky	January 25, 1845	Private, Company B, 122nd Illinois Infantry; Medal of Honor recipient for action at the Battle of Fort Blakeley in which he captured a Confederate flag	Manhattan, Kansas	March 13, 1914	
Nehemiah Green	Hardin County, Ohio	March 8, 1837	Union Civil War veteran and fourth Governor of Kansas (1868–1869)	Manhattan, Kansas	January 12, 1890	
Solon Toothaker Kimball	Manhattan, Kansas	August 12, 1909	educator and anthropologist	Manhattan, Kansas	October 12, 1982	
Abby Lindsey Marlatt	Manhattan, Kansas	December 5, 1916	educator and civil rights activist	Lexington, Kentucky	March 3, 2010	
Benjamin Franklin Mudge	Orrington, Maine	August 11, 1817	lawyer, geologist, politician, and educator	Manhattan, Kansas	November 21, 1879	
John Winter Robinson			physician and first Secretary of State of Kansas (1861–1862)		December 10, 1863	
Samuel Wendell Williston	Boston, Massachusetts	July 10, 1851	educator and paleontologist	Chicago, Illinois	August 30, 1918	
Earl Woods	Manhattan, Kansas	March 5, 1932	soldier, writer, and father of Tiger Woods	Cypress, California	May 3, 2006	Grave is unmarked.

== See also ==
- List of cemeteries in Kansas
