= Ruth O. Selig =

American anthropologist and educator (born 1942)

Ruth O. Selig (born 1942) is an American anthropologist, educator, and museum administrator known for her work advancing the incorporation of anthropology in precollege education, through teacher training programs, publications designed for high school and undergraduate instructors and students, and the Smithsonian Institution's Department of Anthropology's enhanced role in public outreach and education.

== Early life and education ==
Ruth O. Selig was born Ruth Mildred Osterweis on April 22, 1942, in New Haven, Connecticut, the youngest of four sisters. Her father, Rollin G. Osterweis, was a professor of history and oratory and the debate coach at Yale University.

Selig graduated from Wellesley College in 1964 receiving the Erasmus Prize in History at her graduation. She spent a year (1964–65) as an apprentice teacher at the Shady Hill School in Cambridge, Massachusetts, before earning an M.A.T. in social studies from Harvard Graduate School of Education. Selig earned a Master of Arts in anthropology with highest honors in 1975 from the George Washington University (GWU), a graduate program she began while teaching anthropology to high school students at the Holton-Arms School in Bethesda, Maryland.

== Museum career ==
In 1975, Selig began a 35-year career at the Smithsonian Institution, establishing an Office of Outreach and Education in the department of anthropology at the National Museum of Natural History. In 1978, Selig partnered with her former GWU professor, Alison S. Brooks and fellow GWU graduate student JoAnne Lanouette, to develop the National Science Foundation-funded George Washington University/Smithsonian Institution Anthropology For Teachers Program that ran four years in the Washington, D.C. area, training teachers in Maryland and Virginia school districts as well as in the District of Columbia. She directed a similar program in 1984–85 in Laramie, Wyoming, where she partnered with the University of Wyoming Department of Anthropology with funding from the National Endowment for the Humanities/Wyoming Humanities Council. In 1979, the Anthropology for Teachers Program distributed AnthroNotes, a newsletter for its graduates. This publication expanded with Smithsonian support, edited by the same team that ran the teacher training program: Selig, P. Ann Kaupp, Alison S. Brooks, and JoAnne Lanouette.

In 1998, the Smithsonian Press published a compendium of AnthroNotes articles, with Selig as senior editor. Anthropology Explored: The Best of Smithsonian AnthroNotes was a 1998 Natural Science Book Club selection and received excellent reviews in the major anthropology and archaeology journals (American Anthropologist, American Antiquity, Ethnohistory, and Anthropology and Education Quarterly among them), as well as in the Times Literary Supplement. A second, revised and expanded edition of Anthropology Explored appeared in 2004 and again received positive reviews.

In 2002, the Society for American Archaeology (SAA) presented the editors and illustrator of AnthroNotes and Anthropology Explored: The Best of Smithsonian AnthroNotes with the SAA Award for Excellence in Public Education "for presenting archaeological and anthropological research to the public in an engaging and accessible style, and for encouraging the study of these disciplines in classrooms across the nation."

Between 1986 and 2010, Selig held senior administrative positions at the Smithsonian Institution: in the Director's Office, National Museum of Natural History; Office of the Assistant Secretary for Science; Office of the Provost; and Office of the Secretary. In the Office of the Secretary, Selig worked as the Special Assistant to Acting Secretary Cristián Samper (2007-08) and as senior writer/editor for Secretary G. Wayne Clough (2008–2010). Since retiring in 2010, Selig has been a Research Associate-Collaborator in the Smithsonian Institution's department of anthropology.

== Publications ==
Smithsonian Research Online lists 56 publications by Selig. Selected publications include:

2025 Selig, Ruth O., and Alison S. Brooks. Teaching with AnthroNotes Cartoons. Journal of Archaeology and Education 9:2.

2019. Putting Archaeology and Anthropology into Schools: A 2019 Update. Journal of Archaeology and Education 3. (With Colleen Popson).

2017 AnthroNotes. All 84 issues of AnthroNotes were catalogued, scanned, digitized, and made available online. Selig authored new abstracts for over 250 individual articles that are searchable and downloadable through keyword topics as well as by author, title, and date. AnthroNotes was published two or three times each year by the Smithsonian Institution's National Museum of Natural History from 1979 to 2012. Selig was co-founder and senior editor of the publication from its beginning. Other editors included Alison S. Brooks, P. Ann Kaupp, JoAnne Lanouette, and later Marilyn R. London, Carolyn Gecan and digital editor Colleen Popson.

2006 "Anthropology Changing Through Time: Three Decades of AnthroNotes." AnthroNotes 26(2):6–8. National Museum of Natural History, Smithsonian Institution.

2004 Anthropology Explored: Revised and Expanded. Second Edition. Ruth Osterweis Selig, Marilyn R. London, and P. Ann Kaupp, Editors. Smithsonian Books. Washington, D.C. 458 pp. ISBN 1-58834-093-7. An E-Book was issued by Smithsonian Books in 2013. The book remains in print. In addition to serving as senior editor for both editions of Anthropology Explored, Selig wrote the book's Introduction and Preface, and authored or co-authored three chapters.

2004 Instructors Guide by Anna I. Peterson and Ruth O. Selig, 134 pp. This Guide is designed for classroom use with the reader, R.O. Selig, M.R. London, and P.A. Kaupp, eds. Anthropology Explored, Revised and Expanded 2nd edition. 2004.

2001 Professional Associations and Educational Advocacy: The Behavioral Sciences in U.S. Schools, pp. 146–170. In Charles S. White, ed. Sea Change in Social Science Education: Woods Hole 2000. Social Science Education Consortium (SSEC), Boulder, CO.

2000 Brokering Cultures: Archaeologists Reach Out to Teachers, pp. 151–164. In Karolyn Smardz and Shelley Smith, eds. The Archaeology Education Handbook: Sharing the Past with Kids. AltaMira Press.

1998 Anthropology Explored: The Best of Smithsonian AnthroNotes. Ruth Osterweis Selig and Marilyn R. London, editors. Smithsonian Institution Press. Washington and London 338 pp. Natural Science Book Club Selection. Selig is the sole author of the book's Introduction and Acknowledgments, and one chapter. Selig wrote two other chapters profiling anthropologists who each added a short "update" to the original single authored article. 1st ed. ISBN 1-56098-763-4, 1-56098-790-1 (pbk).

1996 The Challenge of Exclusion: Anthropology, Teachers and Schools, pp. 299–307. In Conrad Kottak, Jane White, Richard Furlow, and Patricia Rice, eds. The Teaching of Anthropology: Problems, Issues and Decisions, Mayfield Press.

1991 Teacher Training Programs: The Multiplier Effect in the Classroom, pp. 3–7. In K.C. Smith and F. P. McManamon, eds. Archaeology and Education: The Classroom and Beyond, Archeological Assistance Study, #2, National Park Service, U.S. Department of Interior, Washington, D.C.

1989 Anthropology in Public Schools: Why Should We Care? "Commentary." Anthropology News 30(2): 28, American Anthropological Association

1986 Practicing Anthropology 8(3–4). "Anthropology and Pre-College Education," co-guest editor and co-author of Introduction to special double issue with Patricia J. Higgins; author of article "Anthropology for Wyoming Teachers." Society for Applied Anthropology.

1977 An Indian Legacy. pp. 156–163. A book chapter on Smithsonian research about North American Indians in The Smithsonian Experience, Smithsonian Institution Press. Washington, D.C. ISBN 978-0-89599-000-6

== Professional recognition ==
2008 Jagiellonian University Awarded Plus ratio quam vis Medal for work on the return of the Smithsonian's Institut for Deutsche Ostarbeit archival papers housed in the National Anthropological Archives.

2002 Society for American Archaeology: Received Excellence in Education Award presented for AnthroNotes and the book Anthropology Explored: Best of Smithsonian AnthroNotes.

2000–2003 Appointed by Louise Lamphere, president of the American Anthropological Association, to the Anthropology Education Commission, whose purpose was to work ""towards integrating anthropological concepts, methods, and issues into pre-K through adult education..."

1999-2001 Appointed to the editorial board of American Anthropologist by Robert Sussman, editor-in-chief

== Archives ==
2025. Guide to the Papers of Ruth O. Selig. National Anthropological Archives, Smithsonian Institution, Washington, DC. This guide is a finding aid to Selig's papers, including biographical documents, a full set of AnthroNotes; materials related to the origin, development, and production of AnthroNotes; and records of the NSF-funded Anthropology for Teachers Program. The Guide is posted at the Smithsonian's Online Virtual Archives (SOVA).
