= Louise S. Spindler =

Mary Louise Schaubel Spindler (1917–1997), known professionally as Louise S. Spindler, was an American anthropologist, author, and scholar. Working with her husband and collaborator, George Spindler, she primarily studied the Menominee tribe in Wisconsin and helped revolutionize the field of educational anthropology. She is the sole author of two monographs and four book chapters, as well as the co-author and editor of over 40 books and book chapters and 224 case studies. She was a professor in the anthropology department at Stanford University for nearly fifty years until she died on January 23, 1997 at the age of 80.

== Personal life ==
Spindler was born on March 4, 1917 in Oak Park, Illinois. Growing up, she spent her summers in the Sierras where her father worked to revamp old mines. She later cited her experience playing with the children of mineworkers (from different cultures and backgrounds) as her reason for eventually becoming an anthropologist. She completed undergraduate study at Carroll College in Wisconsin as an English major.

She married George Dearborn Spindler on May 29, 1942. The couple met while George was preparing to teach high school in Park Falls, Wisconsin, where Louise taught German. They had one child, a daughter. Louise's health issues forced the couple to move to California in 1948, where her husband taught at UCLA.

== Career ==
Spindler earned her PhD from Stanford in 1956, becoming the first graduate of the Department of Anthropology. The Spindlers began studying the Menominee in 1948, spending every summer living near the reservation. She specifically studied Menominee women's acculturation, or the ability to adapt and change through time. She argued that Menominee women do not acculturate in the same ways as men. Through this study, she developed the Expressive Autobiographic Interview as an anthropological research method, which made her research more human-centered.

The Spindlers' second major study was of an elementary school in Germany, which they later compared with an elementary school in Wisconsin. There, they looked at ways in which the students and school community adapted and changed as time went on. This study helped them to develop an academic conference for anthropologists and educators, establishing Anthropology of Education as a subfield.

Louise collaborated with George for the duration of her career. The couple developed a collaborative field research technique that allowed them to co-teach and co-publish a number of works. Though they taught classes together, she never wanted to attain a full professorship at Stanford, saying that her lecturer position gave her "freedom" in academia.
