= Cheyenne Woods =

American professional golfer (born 1990)

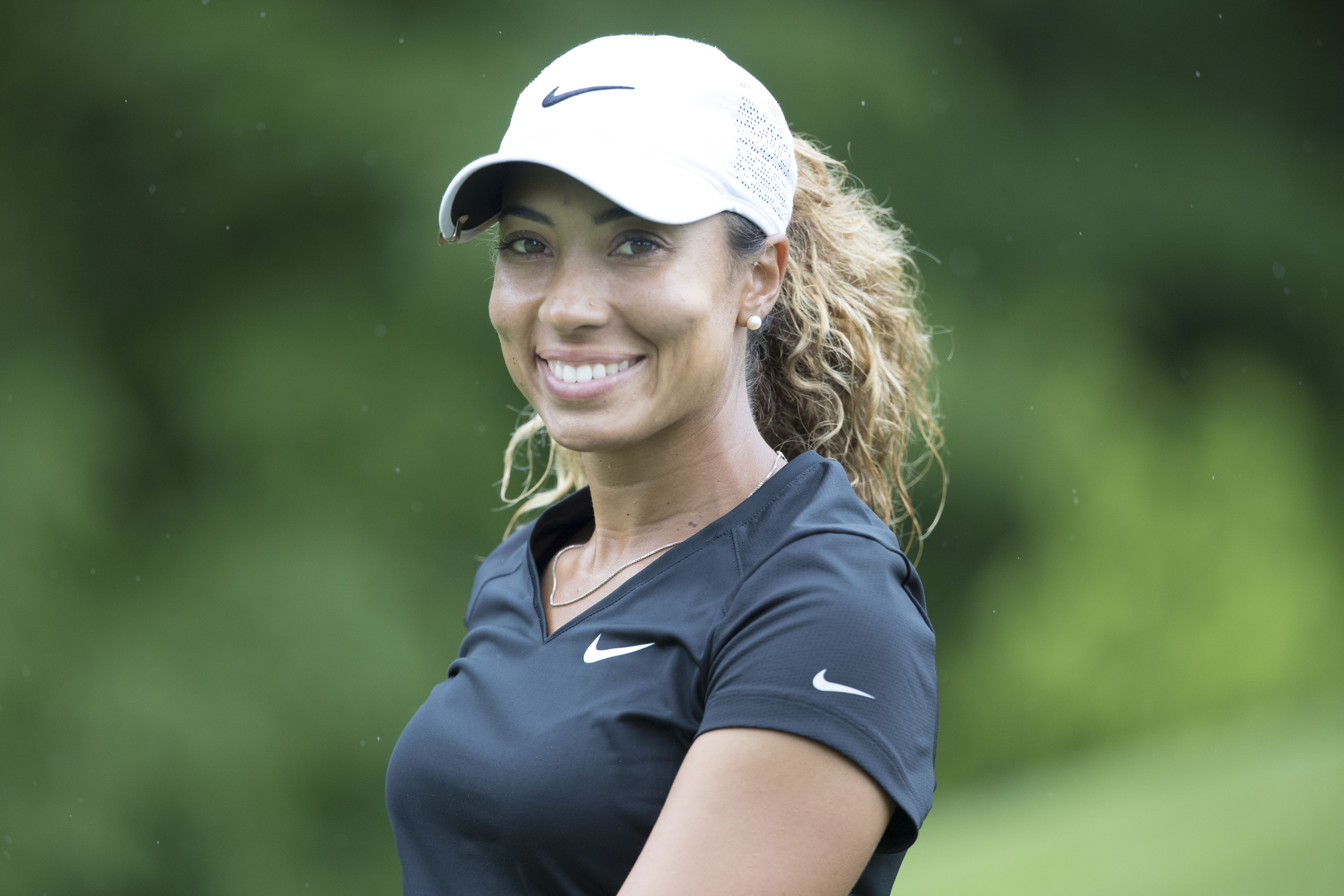
- Woods at the 2016 Kingsmill Championship

Personal information
- Full name: Cheyenne Nicole Woods
- Nationality: United States
- Born: July 25, 1990 (age 36) Phoenix, Arizona, U.S.
- Height: 5 ft 9 in (1.75 m)
- Spouse: Aaron Hicks (m. 2022)
- Children: 2

Career
- Sport: Golf
- College: Wake Forest University
- Turned professional: 2012
- Former tours: Ladies European Tour; LPGA Tour; Symetra Tour
- Professional wins: 2

Number of wins by tour
- Ladies European Tour: 1
- WPGA Tour of Australasia: 1
- Other: 1

Best results in LPGA major championships
- Chevron Championship: DNP
- Women's PGA C'ship: T43: 2016
- U.S. Women's Open: CUT: 2012, 2014, 2017, 2018, 2021
- Women's British Open: CUT: 2014, 2016, 2018
- Evian Championship: T43: 2016

Cheyenne Nicole Woods (born July 25, 1990) is an American professional golfer.

== Early life ==
Woods was born in Phoenix, Arizona in 1990. She is a daughter of Susan Woods and Earl Dennison Woods Jr., who is golfer Tiger Woods' half-brother, making her Tiger's half-niece. Her paternal grandfather Earl Woods (Tiger's father) was her first coach and inspiration.

In an interview with Golf Digest, Woods stated that her mother was white and her father black with some Native American and Asian.

Woods played for the Xavier College Preparatory golf team and won back-to-back Arizona 5A State Championships in 2006 and 2007.

== Amateur career ==
She graduated from Wake Forest University in 2012 where she played golf for the Demon Deacons. She won more than 30 amateur tournaments.

In 2009, she received a sponsor's exemption to play in an LPGA tournament, the Wegmans LPGA. She missed the cut by four strokes.

In April 2011, she won the Atlantic Coast Conference (ACC) championship.

== Professional career ==
In 2012, Woods turned professional after graduating from Wake Forest. She qualified for the 2012 U.S. Women's Open by finishing as co-medalist at her qualifier and made her professional debut at the 2012 LPGA Championship. She had her first professional win on the SunCoast Ladies Series in late August 2012.

In 2013, Woods became a member of the Ladies European Tour and finished 78th on the Order of Merit. In 2014, Woods had her second professional win (and first on a major tour) at the Volvik RACV Ladies Masters.

In December 2014, Woods finished T-11th in the LPGA Final Qualifying Tournament, thereby earning Category 12 membership, which entitled her to entry in most full-field events apart from the more prestigious events. In the 2015 season, she made only eight cuts and had to go through qualifying again. By finishing T-13th in the Final Qualifying Tournament, she earned her LPGA tour card for 2016.

As of 2023, Woods lacks a LPGA Tour card to play as a full-time member. Her most recent LPGA appearance was at the Cambia Portland Classic in September 2021.

== Personal life ==
On October 27, 2021, Woods got engaged to professional baseball player Aaron Hicks. They married in February 2022, and their son was born in April 2022. They reside in Scottsdale, Arizona.

Woods is the sixth African American to play on the LPGA Tour. In a 2013 interview, Woods said "An African American woman has never won on the LPGA, so in general I just feel that golf needs to be more accessible and more inclusive."

== Professional wins (2) ==
=== Ladies European Tour wins (1) ===
No.	Date	Tournament	Winning score	To par	Margin of victory	Runner-up	Winner's share (€)
1	Feb 9, 2014	Volvik RACV Ladies Masters*	69-67-71-69=276	−16	2 strokes	(Australia) Minjee Lee (a)	37,500

* Co-sanctioned with ALPG Tour

=== Other wins (1) ===
- 2012 SunCoast Ladies Series LPGA International

== Results in LPGA majors ==
Results not in chronological order before 2018.

Tournament	2012	2013	2014	2015	2016	2017	2018	2019	2020
ANA Inspiration									
U.S. Women's Open	CUT		CUT			CUT	CUT		
Women's PGA Championship	CUT			CUT	T43	CUT	T68		
Women's British Open			CUT		CUT		CUT		
The Evian Championship ^		CUT	CUT		T43				NT

Tournament	2021
ANA Inspiration	
U.S. Women's Open	CUT
Women's PGA Championship	
The Evian Championship	
Women's British Open	

^ The Evian Championship was added as a major in 2013.

Did not play

CUT = missed the half-way cut
NT = no tournament
T = tied
