= Rollin G. Osterweis =

American historian (1907–1982)

- Born: August 15, 1907; New Haven, Connecticut, U.S.
- Died: February 28, 1982 (aged 74); Branford, Connecticut, U.S.
- Education: Yale University (BA, MA, PhD); Georgetown University
- Occupation: Historian
- Employer: Yale University
- Spouse: Ruth Mildred Loewenstein
- Children: 4 daughters

Rollin G. Osterweis (1907 – 1982) was an American historian in the Department of History at Yale University for twenty eight years while also serving as the Yale Director of Debating and Public Speaking. Osterweis was the author of numerous books and articles focused on the history of the American South and on New Haven, Connecticut.

== Early life and education ==
Rollin Gustav Osterweis was a native of New Haven, Connecticut, where his grandfather, Lewis Osterweis, had established a cigar factory in 1860. Osterweis was born on August 15, 1907, in West Haven, Connecticut, the son of Gustave and Rose Osterweis. He was educated at Hamden Hall Country Day School and Taft School, earning his B.A. in 1930 from Yale University, where he captained the varsity debate team. He attended Yale Law School and the School of Foreign Service at Georgetown University before joining his family's business, Lewis Osterweis and Sons, manufacturers of cigars in New Haven.

During his ten years in the cigar business, Osterweis pursued his interests in history and American Jewish history, writing two biographies about prominent Jewish Americans, Judah P. Benjamin, Secretary of State for the Confederacy, and Rebecca Gratz, a philanthropist and social activist from a prominent family in Philadelphia. Gratz, reputed to be the inspiration for Sir Walter Scott's Rebecca in Ivanhoe, was a friend of Washington Irving's tragically short-lived fiancée, Matilda Hoffman. Because of Osterweis's early interest in Scott and Washington Irving, in his late teens he began a book collection of American and British First Editions of the major works of Washington Irving. In 1942 Osterweis returned to Yale for graduate studies in history, receiving an M.A. in 1943 and a Ph.D. in 1946.

== Career ==
Osterweis joined Yale's History department in 1948, became an associate professor in 1954, and a full professor of history and oratory in 1968. He was a fellow of Jonathan Edwards College. His major publications were Romanticism and Nationalism in the Old South (1949) and the 1953 tercentenary history of New Haven, Three Centuries of New Haven, 1638–1938.

While a professor at Yale, Osterweis taught courses on southern and urban history, and served as coach for the Yale Debate Association (YDA), which celebrated its Centennial in 2008. Osterweis also served as faculty advisor to the Yale Political Union and developed an unusual course, The History and Practice of American Oratory, which included the preparation and presentation of speeches for course credit. Osterweis taught and coached several future national leaders in public speaking, including William F. Buckley Jr., Edwin Meese, David Boren, John Kerry, and George W. Bush. The Osterweis Debate Tournament at Yale for high school students in Connecticut is named in his honor. In 1976, Osterweis appeared on the CBS television station as an expert commentator for the Carter-Ford presidential debates.

After Osterweis retired from Yale as professor emeritus in 1976, he became adjunct professor of history and political science at the University of New Haven, which had awarded him an honorary degree in 1975. He was awarded the Yale Medal in 1982.

Osterweis owned the first (and only) female bulldog to serve as Yale's mascot, selected in 1975 to celebrate co-education at the formerly all-male school. On November 10, 1979, the New York Times reported that a group of Princeton University students posing as Yale cheerleaders kidnapped Handsome Dan XII, aka Bingo Osterweis, the evening before the Yale-Princeton football game. Yale got its revenge on the field, beating Princeton 35–10, and Bingo was returned safely to Osterweis after the game. The caper made headlines throughout the region.

Osterweis and his daughter Rollyn Osterweis Krichbaum helped develop a PBS 12-part Television Series narrated by William F. Buckley Jr. called "Freedom to Speak," inspired by Osterweis's course at Yale and his unpublished 1980 manuscript "American Oratory in Historical Perspective." Both father and daughter died before the series aired in February 1983, but they were listed as script consultants throughout the series;. An article, "‘Freedom to Speak’: A Tribute to Osterweis,” appeared in the New Haven Journal Courier on January 27, 1983 and can be found, along with other articles about “Freedom to Speak,” in the Yale Manuscripts and Archives.

== Community leadership ==
Active in New Haven civic affairs, Osterweis held posts with the New Haven Community Chest, the New Haven Chapter of the American Red Cross as well as serving as president of the New Haven Yale Club (1950–52), the New Haven Colony Historical Society (1962–68), the Yale Faculty Club (1970–72), and the New Haven Preservation Trust (1971–1975). He was vice president of Temple Mishkan Israel (1943–44), a Reform congregation that his family had been involved with since its beginnings in the mid-19th century. In May 1974 Osterweis received the Liberty Bell, the highest award of the New Haven County Bar Association, and in 1975 the University of New Haven awarded him an honorary doctorate, citing his contributions as both an historian of New Haven and civic leader. In 1977, he was elected to the Proprietor's Committee of the Common and Undivided Lands in the Town of New Haven, a committee begun in colonial times, responsible for the preservation of the New Haven Green.

== Personal life and death ==
Osterweis was married to the former Ruth Mildred Loewenstein of Charleston, West Virginia, and the couple had four daughters: Nancy O. Alderman, Sally O. Kopman, and identical twins Ruth O. Selig and Rollyn O. Krichbaum, the latter predeceasing him on February 4, 1982. Osterweis died February 28, 1982, in Branford, Connecticut.

== Selected publications ==
Books:

- Osterweis, Rollin G. (1933). Judah P. Benjamin: Statesman of the Lost Cause. New York: G. P. Putnam's Sons. OCLC 1031734264.
- Osterweis, Rollin G. (1935). Rebecca Gratz: A Study in Charm. New York: G.P Putnam's Sons. Introduction by A.S.W. Rosenbach and foreword by David Philipson.
- Osterweis, Rollin G. (1949). Romanticism and Nationalism in the Old South. New Haven, Connecticut: Yale University Press. OCLC 2117668.
- Osterweis, Rollin G. (1953). Three Centuries of New Haven, 1638- 1938. New Haven: Yale University Press. Library of Congress original Catalog Card #52-12064.
- Osterweis, Rollin G. et Jacques Guicharnaud (1960). Santarem (a novel about Confederados). Paris, France: Plon.
- Osterweis, Rollin G. (1973). The Myth of the Lost Cause, 1865–1900. Hamden, Connecticut: Archon Books. OCLC 26037233.
- Osterweis, Rollin G. (1976). The New Haven Green and The American Bicentennial. Hamden, Connecticut: Archon Books. ISBN 0-208-01578-7.

Articles:

- Osterweis, Rollin G. “The Sesquicentennial History of the Connecticut Academy of Arts and Sciences." New Haven: Reprint from Transactions, Vol. 38, Oct. 1949, pp. 103–149.
- Osterweis, Rollin G. (1958). "The Tallmadge Amendment." Social Education, Volume 22, no. 2: 59–62.
- Osterweis, Rollin G. (1961). "The Idea of Southern Nationalism." In The Causes of the American Civil War, Problems in American Civilization Series, edited by Edwin C. Rozwenc. Boston: D.C. Heath and Company, pp. 134–149.
- Osterweis, Rollin G. "New Haven: Its Evolution from Colonial Settlement to Modern City." In Proceedings of The Fourth International Congress on the Enlightenment and the Sixth Annual Meeting of the American Society for Eighteenth Century Studies. New Haven, 1975.
- Osterweis, Rollin G. "Industry and Culture in Nineteenth Century New Haven: Eli Whitney and the Inventive Spirit," Essays in Arts and Sciences, University of New Haven, Vol. X, No. 2, March 1982.

== Awards and recognition ==
- 1974 Liberty Bell Award from the New Haven County Bar Association
- 1975 Honorary Doctorate of Humane Letters. University of New Haven.
- 1980 The Osterweis Debate Tournament, established for Connecticut high school students, was named by the Yale Debate Association in honor of Rollin Osterweis following his retirement from Yale in 1976.
- 1982 Yale Medal (the highest honor awarded by the Yale Alumni Association).
- 2012 The top 200 people of New Haven

== Archives ==
Papers from the professional and public life of Rollin G. Osterweis are archived in the Rollin Gustav Osterweis Papers, 1907–1983, in the New Haven Museum, Collection B30, along with its Finding Aid. Aside from a few letters and some genealogy and family history, there is no personal or family material. The material includes various awards and newspaper articles describing his contributions. The archive also includes the author's personal copies of all his articles and books. Rollin Gustav Osterweis Papers, 1907–1983.

The papers of Rollin G. Osterweis as President of the New Haven Colony Historical Society have been transferred to the Archives of the Society, MSS C-1 Box I, Folder J. in the same museum archives.

Most papers on Osterweis's teaching and his work with the Yale Debating Association can be found in the Yale Manuscripts and Archives. This collection includes photographs of the Yale Debate Team throughout the years Osterweis served as the Yale Debate Coach.

The entire Osterweis Washington Irving Collection was donated in 2013 to the Library of Historic Hudson Valley (HHV), located in Tarrytown, New York, the home of Washington Irving. The collection's Finding Aid, including extensive biographical material about Osterweis, is available online.

Papers related to the Osterweis's family business, Lewis Osterweis and Sons, a cigar manufacturing company in New Haven, Connecticut, 1860–1954, can be found in the New Haven Museum, in MSS Collection B53. This collection includes a Finding Aid with historical material on the history of the Osterweis family in New Haven.
