= Handsome Dan =

Mascot of Yale University's sports teams

Handsome Dan is a bulldog that serves as the mascot of Yale University's sports teams. In addition to a person wearing a costume, the position is filled by an actual bulldog, the honor and title being transferred to a successor upon death or retirement.

== Handsome Dan I ==
Active 1889–1897 (retired to England).

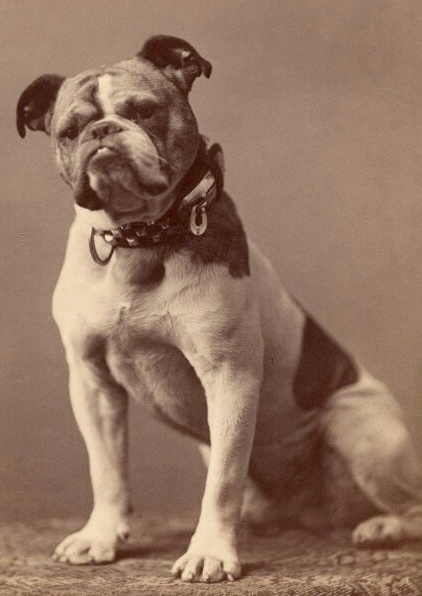
The original Handsome Dan, bought by Yale tackle Andrew Graves in 1889

Handsome Dan was selected based on his ability to tolerate bands and children, negative reaction to the color crimson and to tigers (the symbols of rival schools Harvard and Princeton respectively), bought by Yale student Andrew Barbey Graves, who cleaned up the dog and named him “Handsome Dan.” Soon, Dan followed Graves everywhere around campus, including sporting events. The students quickly adopted Dan as the Yale mascot. After Graves graduated and returned to England, Dan stayed on campus with his master's brother, William Leon Graves. Before football and baseball games would begin, Handsome Dan founded a tradition and a dynasty by being led across the field. One newspaper reported: "He was a big white bulldog, with one of the greatest faces a dog of that breed (English) ever carried". This was not an exaggeration, as Handsome Dan was one of the finest specimens of his breed in America, and went on to win first prize at the Westminster Dog Show and at least thirty other first prize ribbons in the United States and Canada. According to the Hartford Courant, "In personal appearance, he seemed like a cross between an alligator and a horned frog, and he was called handsome by the metaphysicians under the law of compensation. The title came to him, he never sought it. He was always taken to games on a leash, and the Harvard football team for years owed its continued existence to the fact that the rope held." The Philadelphia Press reported that "a favorite trick was to tell him to 'Speak to Harvard.' He would bark ferociously and work himself into physical contortions of rage never before dreamed of by a dog. Dan was peculiar to himself in one thing – he would never associate with anyone but students. Dan implanted himself more firmly in the hearts of Yale students than any mascot had ever done before." Handsome Dan crossed the Atlantic to join his old master in 1897 and died in 1898. Graves had Dan taxidermied and returned him to be displayed at Yale in the old gymnasium. When it was torn down, Dan I was sent to the Peabody Museum for reconstruction. Handsome Dan I now is in a sealed glass case in one of the trophy rooms of Yale's Payne Whitney Gymnasium, where, according to Stanton Ford, "he is the perpetual guardian of the treasures which attest to generations of Yale athletic glory." Andrew Graves died of tuberculosis on February 18, 1948, in Westbury, Long Island.

== Handsome Dan II ==
Active 1933–1937 (died of a broken leg).
After a 35-year interval, Handsome Dan II was purchased with pennies donated by the freshman class, and given to coach Ducky Pond. Handsome Dan II was dognapped by Harvard students the day before the 1934 Harvard-Yale football game, and Yale students were alarmed at photographs of him happily seated at the foot of the statue of John Harvard in Harvard Yard, having a snack. He died of a leg fracture received from a jump. Handsome Dan II is now located at the Yale Peabody Museum.

== Handsome Dan III ==
Active 1937–1938 (retired due to emotional instability).
Handsome Dan III was a huge white dog who exhibited morbid fear of crowds and had to be retired.

== Handsome Dan IV ==
Active 1938–1940 (retired due to injury).
Handsome Dan IV had his spine fractured by a car early in his term of office, leaving his hind legs paralyzed. Until he eventually died in 1940, a bulldog named Bull served in his place, becoming Handsome Dan V.

== Handsome Dan V ==
Active 1940–1947 (died of old age).
"Bull", brought in his youth to watch football practices by his owner, high school student Bob Day, who lived near the Yale Bowl, ascended to office when Handsome Dan IV died. A great success, he loved public appearances and the adulation of crowds, was a familiar figure around the locker rooms, and joined the team on a trip to Princeton University.

== Handsome Dan VI ==
Active 1947–1949 (died at age two).
Handsome Dan VI was eight weeks old when he took the role, but died at age two. It was reported that he died from fear of fireworks at the Yale-Harvard game, or of shame from seeing the Yale team lose to both Princeton and Harvard in the same year.

== Handsome Dan VII ==
Active 1949–1952 (retired due to emotional instability).
Handsome Dan VII was donated to football coach Herman Hickman at age 3 but he proved to have a bad temper, which suited him better in his next position as a watchdog on a Florida estate.

== Handsome Dan VIII ==
Active 1952 (retired due to emotional instability).
Up to this point, Handsome Dans had lived at the Yale Boathouse and were cared for in a somewhat haphazard fashion. Handsome Dan VIII, however, was owned by assistant football manager Tom Shutt, ushering in a new era of family membership for the office-holder. Nevertheless, he had to retire after only two games due to intense discomfort with public appearances.

== Handsome Dan IX ==
Active 1953–1959 (died of acute kidney disease).
Notable for falling off the dock at the Yale Boathouse and nearly drowning (confirming the hypothesis that bulldogs cannot swim, due to the peculiarities of their physiques); some contemporary news reports say that he had to be resuscitated after having had his head embedded in the mud. He also appeared on the cover of Sports Illustrated magazine in November, 1956. "Danny" was born September 11, 1953, and owned by John E. Sanders, Assistant Professor of Geology, after an earlier custody by physical education instructor Alfred E. Scholz and Varsity Crew Coach Jim Rothschmidt. He made his mascot debut at the age of six weeks and an autopsy at his death revealed that he succumbed to acute nephrotic syndrome.

== Handsome Dan X ==
Active 1959–1969 (retired due to old age).
"Woodie" aka "Boodnick", also owned by John E. Sanders, marked a return to the high standards seen in Handsome Dan V. An impressive 74 pounds, a beloved family pet as well as winner of the best bulldog title at the Cape Cod Kennel Club conformation dog show, he was instrumental in leading Yale's football team to its 9 and 0 season in 1960. He spent several years commuting to New Haven, CT, from Dobbs Ferry, NY, prior to his retirement. His registered AKC kennel name was "Bayside Woodnought." He was sired by Ch. Bonny Boy of Fearnought out of Woodside's Christie Lou, and was a grandson of the famed Kippax Fearnought, the celebrated English import, who went Best in Show in 1955 at Westminster. He died in 1971 of natural causes.

== Handsome Dan XI ==
Active 1969–1974 (retired due to arthritis).
"Oliver", owned by Yale's Pierson College master John Hersey, loved football but had a tendency to doze in the sun during games. He was frequently sighted on Martha's Vineyard during the tourist season.

== Handsome Dan XII ==
Active 1975–1984.

"Bingo", owned by history professor Rollin G. Osterweis, was described by her owner as "pugnacious and stubborn, but lovable." Bingo also had the distinction of being the only female Handsome Dan. Bingo was stolen by four Princeton undergrads posing as Yale cheerleaders. They took Bingo to a friend's apartment in New York City on the run from authorities. The mastermind behind the canine-caper was Rod Shepard. The group of students took Bingo back to her owner and held a press conference for her return.

== Handsome Dan XIII ==
Active 1984–1995; 1996 (retired due to old age).
He was also known as "Maurice" and was owned by Chris Getman, Yale Class of 1964. "Maurice" served in office longer than any other Handsome Dan; he was the only holder of the office to come out of retirement to serve again, due to the death of his successor, "Whizzer".

In December 1988, he was hit by a car near East Rock Park and needed 3 pins in his hip for recovery. He appeared in Sports Illustrated in 1989. At one point, Getman auctioned off the right to walk Maurice at the next Harvard football game for $1,500.

His patience with the tedium of posing for professional photographers also served him well as he posed for game programs, brochures, and the 1991 Yale Christmas card, wearing a wreath and Santa Claus hat. He also appeared at swim meets, wearing a bathing suit. Maurice would sing along with the Yale fight song (at least the "bow wow wow" part); he would "play dead" when asked whether he would rather die or join Harvard; and he lost his normally docile nature around mascots of opposing teams, launching assaults on the Princeton tiger mascot and the Brown University bear mascot. He died in 1997, just before turning 14.

== Handsome Dan XIV ==
Active 1995–1996 (died of heart attack).
"Whizzer" aka "Hetherbull", also owned by Chris Getman, was donated by Yale alumnus and bulldog breeder Bob Hetherington and was a descendant of 52-time best-in-show winner Hetherbull Arrogant Frigott. He possessed a temperament so hyperexcitable that he died in office from a heart attack, and was succeeded by his predecessor and housemate.

== Handsome Dan XV ==
Active 1996–2005 (unknown death).
"Louis", also donated by Bob Hetherington and owned by Chris Getman, was named after three people named Louis, including football coach Carm Louis Cozza. He died in office in January 2005 of a possible heart attack.

== Handsome Dan XVI ==
Active 2005–2006 (retired).
Handsome Dan XVI was chosen on 26 April 2005. Magnificent Mugsy Rangoon, a Bulldog from Hamden, Connecticut, was picked by a five-person panel for his gregarious personality, large size (69 pounds), good health, and his ability to deal with the raucous Yale Precision Marching Band. At the auditions, Mugsy gained great favor by focusing on a crimson blanket (representing Harvard) versus the stuffed-toy tiger (representing Princeton University). "We beat Princeton three of four years," said Jeff Mroz, Yale's quarterback. "We want to beat Harvard."

Mugsy is owned by Bob Sansone, a North Haven middle school teacher.

At his first Harvard-Yale Game in 2005, Handsome Dan XVI was briefly stolen by a pair of Harvard undergraduates, in response to a Yale student stealing the Harvard flag and running across the field back to the Yale side with it. The two lured him into the Harvard student section of the Yale Bowl as he chewed a toy depicting a Harvard football player. Yale University Police recovered him, unharmed but without his Yale sweater, a few minutes later.

Handsome Dans traditionally reign for a lifetime, but Mugsy retired and lived with his owner Bob Sansone in Hamden.

== Handsome Dan XVII ==
Active 2006–2016 (died of heart attack).

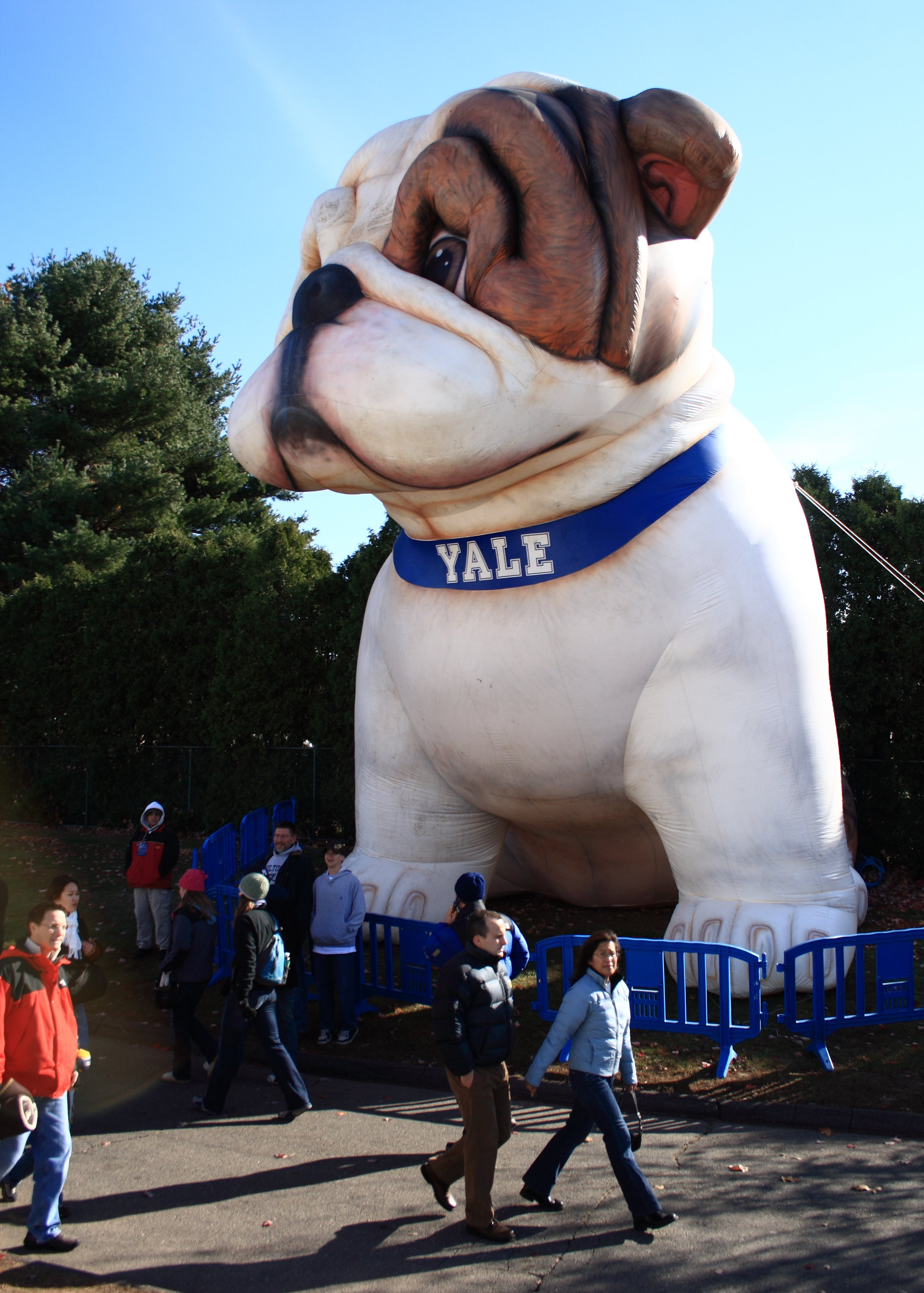
An inflatable Handsome Dan bulldog, on display during the 2007 Harvard-Yale game

A new bulldog named Sherman quietly assumed the mascot position as Handsome Dan XVII in late winter 2006.

Bred by Diane Judy of Johnson City, Tenn., Handsome Dan XVII, a 50-pound bulldog, was the half brother of Rambo, owned by former Yale football captain Rory Hennessey. His home name was "Sherman", after the tank and Connecticut icon Roger Sherman. He took over as Handsome Dan XVII with great enthusiasm. He was photographed with former president George H. W. Bush and Sir Paul McCartney. He was very athletic, retrieved with vigor and raised thousands of dollars for charity.

He died on August 11, 2016.

== Handsome Dan XVIII ==
Active 2016–2021 (retired).
Handsome Dan XVIII was announced as mascot on November 17, 2016. He was born September 23, 2016, to breeders Jessica and Pete Seiders of Wicked Good Bulldogges in Maine. After generations of English Bulldog mascots, the university chose a healthier breed and closer replication of the original Handsome Dan. Handsome Dan XVIII was an Olde English Bulldogge, also known as a Victorian Bulldog, a recreation of the Victorian Era Bulldog bred for health and temperament. Handsome Dan XVIII's football record was 3–1 against Harvard and 24–7 overall through the 2019 season. The new keeper of the mascot, called Walter at home, was Kevin Discepolo (Yale ’09), a former lacrosse player turned Yale’s assistant athletic director of facilities, operations, and events.

On 5 November 2020, it was announced that Handsome Dan XVIII would retire in early spring 2021 following the October departure of Discepolo, though it was not known whether there was a causal link.

== Handsome Dan XIX ==
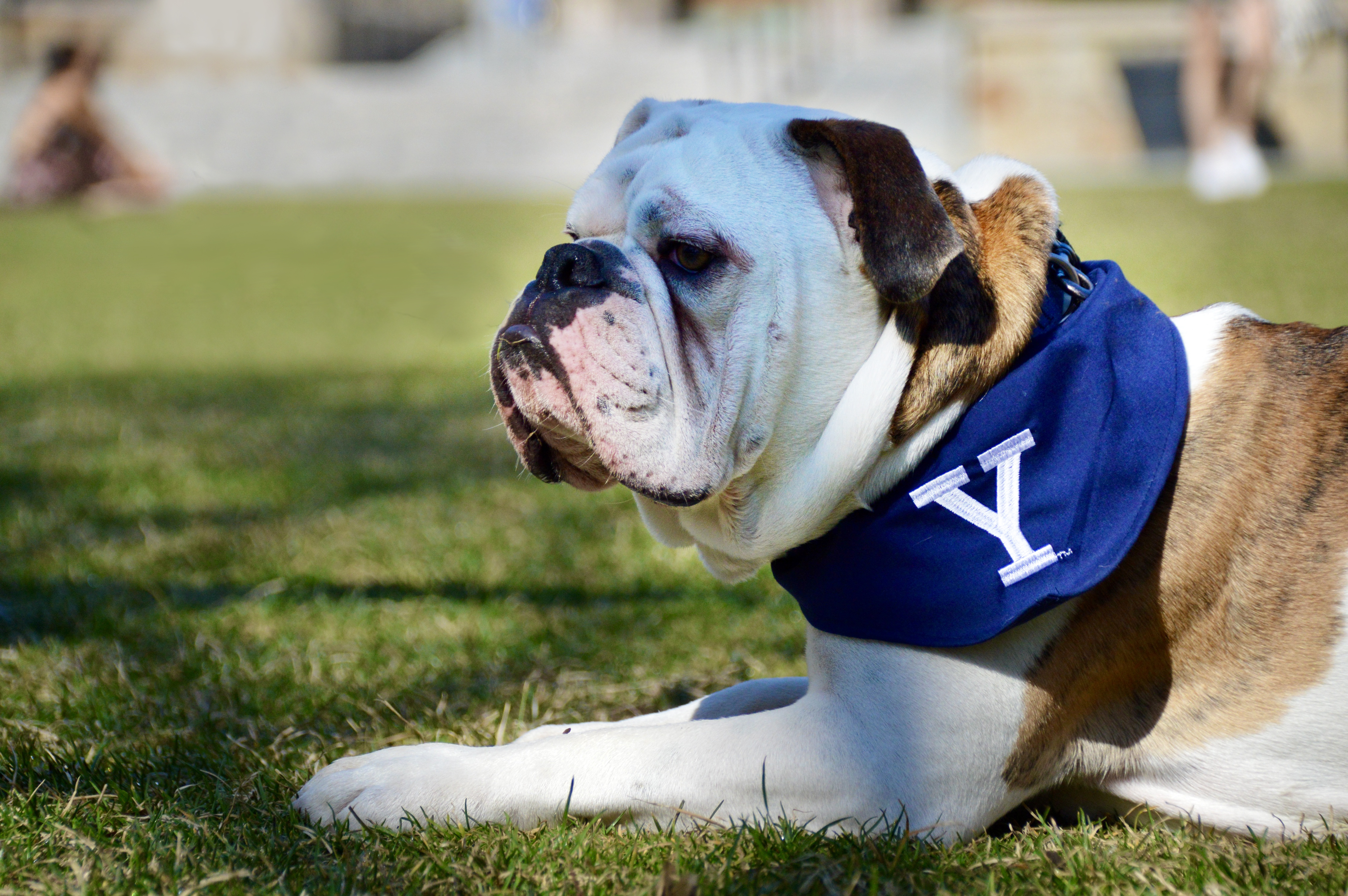
Handsome Dan XIX (Kingman) (March 2022)

Active 2021–present. Handsome Dan XIX was announced as mascot on March 18, 2021. He was born January 2, 2021, and is a nephew of his predecessor Handsome Dan XVIII. Like his predecessor he is an Olde English Bulldogge aka Victorian Bulldog produced by Jessica and Pete Seiders of Wicked Good Bulldogges from Maine. In addition to being known as Handsome Dan, he was named "Kingman" by his handler, Kassandra “Kassie” Haro, after the late Yale president of the same name.

== In popular culture ==
The Shake Shack location in New Haven, Connecticut, features a menu item named after Handsome Dan, called the Handsome Dog. The Handsome Dog, which features beer-marinated deep-fried onions and two kinds of cheese, debuted at the New Haven location but can now be found at all other Shake Shack locations, albeit as the Dapper Dog.

The TV series Gilmore Girls, which is set in Connecticut, makes several references to the Handsome Dan Statue.

In the TV series Gossip Girl, Blair Waldorf is given a pet bulldog by her father in season 2, episode 16. The bulldog is named Handsome Dan in honor of Blair's aspirations to attend Yale following high school. Blair shortens his name to "Handsome". Blair's scheming results in her losing her acceptance to Yale, and she gives the bulldog away to a homeless man. However, she later orders him back. When her father returns to France, he forces his daughter to let him take “Handsome” back with him, as he is disappointed with her.

In the movie Wayne's World 2, Handsome Dan is a radio personality for WPIG. Despite his name, he isn't classically handsome. Harry Shearer played the role.

== See also ==
- List of individual dogs
