= Marion Pearsall =

American anthropologist (1923–1984)

Marion Pearsall (April 27, 1923, Brooklyn, New York – June 15, 1984) was an anthropologist and university professor, who was a leader in the development of both medical anthropology and applied social and cultural anthropology, and an authority on the southern American cultures.

She spent the majority of her career at the University of Kentucky and its Medical Center.

== Early life and education ==
She was born on April 27, 1923, in Brooklyn, New York, then grew up in rural upstate New York. Her parents were George Martin Pearsall and Anna Laura (White) Pearsall. She graduated from Hamilton High School in Hamilton, New York in 1940. She earned her B.A. from the University of New Mexico in 1944, and her Ph.D. from the University of California at Berkeley in 1950.

== Career ==
Marion Pearsall undertook her doctoral research in southern Appalachia, and published findings from her research and return visits in her book, Little Smoky Ridge, published in 1959. She taught at the University of Arkansas in 1950, and then travelled to Nyasaland in Africa to take a position as a research fellow at Rhodes-Livingstone Institute in 1951, returning to teach at the University of Alabama from 1952 to 1956. During her time here, she worked with Solon T. Kimball and Thomas R. Ford on a community study of Talladega, Alabama, research from which she co-authored with Kimball in their book about community decision making, The Talladega Study published in 1954.

Following this, she was a post-doctoral social science resident at the Russell Sage Foundation from 1956 to 1958. This program was an effort to show health professional schools that social science could make a valuable contribution to their programs. She undertook residencies at Boston University School of Nursing and several Boston hospitals during this time.

She then served as a rural sociologist at the University of Kentucky from 1958 to 1964, and as a professor at the University of Kentucky Medical Center from 1964 to 1983, as a member of the Department of Behavioral Sciences. She also held a joint appointment in the Department of Anthropology and was involved in establishing the Center for Developmental Change at the university.

She was a member of many professional associations including the American Anthropological Association, the Royal Anthropological Institute of Great Britain and Ireland, the American Association for the Advancement of Science, and the Society for Medical Anthropology which she helped to organize. She served as a consultant to many organizations including as a grant proposal reviewer for the National Science Foundation, and the National Institutes of Health, as well as a research consultant to the National Institute of Mental Health Clinical Research Center and the Veterans Administration Hospital in Lexington, Kentucky. She also served on the review committee for the Nurse Scientist Graduate Training Program and as a member of the Committee on Life Sciences and Social Policy for the National Academy of Sciences. She helped establish an Early Health Maintenance Organization for the underserved in Lexington.

Particularly important to her was her consulting work with the Frontier Nursing Services which brought health care to isolated people in the Kentucky mountains. She helped found the Hunter Foundation for Health Care, named after Dr. John Edward Hunter and his son Dr. Bush Alexander Hunter. This foundation was a non-profit health care delivery model designed to serve low income people in the poorest areas of Lexington, Kentucky. It operated from 1956 to 1976. She was the editor of the Society for Applied Anthropology journal, Human Organization, from 1966 to 1983. Her areas of expertise were the rural South in the United States, and the development of health care systems.

Marion Pearsall died on June 15, 1984, aged 61 years after a long struggle with cancer. Her professional library and papers were left to the Department of Behavioral Sciences at the University of Kentucky, and her archive is located at the University of Kentucky library.
