= Dog theft =

Act of taking a dog from its owner

Dog theft is the crime of taking a dog from its owner. The theft of a dog to be held for ransom may be called dognapping, by analogy with kidnapping.

Historically in the United States, dogs had been stolen and sold on for medical research, but the introduction of the Animal Welfare Act of 1966 reduced these occurrences. The profit available to thieves varies based upon the value of the dog or the amount that its original owners are willing to pay as ransom.

In Vietnam, dog and cat theft for consumption as meat was described as a growing problem in 2020.

== History in the US and the UK ==
There are reports of dogs being held for ransom since the 1930s. Harvard students kidnapped Yale's mascot Handsome Dan II in March 1934, which was reported by the media as "dognapping". By July of the same year, what was considered by the press to be Chicago's first case of dog theft was solved with the return of a Boston Terrier named Kids Boot Ace, who had been missing for five months.

The first high-profile case of a dog being stolen for monetary ransom occurred in 1948 when the editor of US House & Garden magazine, Richardson Wright, had a Pekingese puppy taken by a passing motorist who later telephoned to demand from him "as much money as you can pay" for the dog's return.

In 1952, a "dognapping wave" was being reported in the British media. During this period, research laboratories would purchase "bootleg" dogs for experimentation, and patterns of thefts were apparent with specific types of dogs going missing at certain times. This led to the consideration of using dogs obtained from dog wardens instead of killing those dogs, in order to cut down on the market for thieves to sell on stolen dogs.

Gangs would often move dogs out of state for resale. In addition to selling dogs on for scientific research, thieves would sometimes return the dogs simply to collect the reward set by its owners. One thief speaking to Congress members about the crime, in return for his identity being protected, stated that: "If they had a collar on, I would try to get a reward for them, because a lot of times a person would like to get a dog back. I got $5 for bringing two Basset Hounds back one time."

With the rise in popularity of conformation showing, show dogs began to be specifically targeted. In 1959, ten Poodles valued at a total of $25,000 were ransomed for a sum of $5,000 in New York state. In this case, the dogs were taken by a group of three women, including one who formerly worked for the owner of the dogs as a groomer. The charges brought were that of burglary.

By 1965, thieves were targeting specific dogs being used in greyhound racing. A dog named Hi Joe, valued by his owners at around $14,000, was taken from his kennel in London, England. It was thought that the dog was being taken to Scotland to be run in order to earn money for its new owners, as the dog had won all of his last six races. This was Britain's first recorded dognapping.

=== Laws ===
By the mid-1960s, calls were being made for laws to prevent dog theft. The United States Congress was already working on legislation to restrict the handling and sale of animals for research when a pet Dalmatian was taken in Pennsylvania during June 1965, and ten days later a Dalmatian was reported to have died during experimental heart surgery in a New York hospital. The dog was thought to be the same animal as it was traced to a farm which supplied two Dalmatians to that hospital, but by the time it was discovered that the dogs were delivered directly to the hospital and not the farm, the dog's corpse had been cremated. This incident started a series of events which led to Congress discussing the matter. The two senators who led the drive for a new law were Joseph S. Clark and Joseph Resnick.

Opponents to the bill argued that very few research animals were stolen, while Clark argued that it was natural to make dog theft a federal crime as it was already illegal to transport stolen cars and cattle across state lines. The American Humane Society presented evidence of dog theft rings in Delaware, Pennsylvania, New Jersey and New York; and another witness stated that boys were being paid $2 for each dog they delivered to a dealer.

Medical research organisations sought to change the bill by removing references to animals other than cats or dogs, saying that: "It would impose a well-nigh impossible burden to regulate traffic in fish, frogs, turtles, reptiles, birds and the many other mammalian forms used in laboratories." The senate was reported to have received more mail on the dognapping bill than on bills related to the Civil Rights Movement or the Vietnam War. During its introduction the bill was known as "The dognapping law"; once introduced, it became the Animal Welfare Act of 1966.

=== Since 1966 ===
After the introduction of the Animal Welfare Act in 1966, the trade in stolen dogs simply moved on to other revenue sources. Pet shops were found to be purchasing stolen dogs, and some laboratories were found to be continuing to accept them. Newspapers such as the Los Angeles Times ran articles advising readers on how to prevent their dogs from being stolen.

Celebrities continued to be targeted, with NASCAR driver Junior Johnson's dog being returned after he offered a $1,000 reward; a group of three men said that they had simply found the dog, although when they met with Johnson they took the care to cover the licence plate of their car with a paper bag. By 1976, more than a hundred dogs per month were being taken and held for ransom in Chicago alone. In 1978 a Boxer show dog named Tyegarth Bottoms Up was taken from the Crufts dog show in England, only to be found some time later after he was brought to Battersea Dogs and Cats Home.

Statistics in the United Kingdom showed that over three hundred dogs per year were being stolen by 2006, with instances mentioned of dogs being stolen by gangs involved in Irish Traveller communities.

The American Kennel Club began to track pet thefts in the United States in 2007, and found that in 2009 alone a 30% increase has been seen in this type of crime.

In recent years, celebrities continue to be targeted with British West End theatre star Sheridan Smith's Shar Pei being taken twice in the space of a month with police believing it to be a repeat offence. The first time that the dog went missing, it was recognised by staff at Battersea Dogs and Cats Home after radio DJ Chris Moyles put out an appeal during his breakfast show on BBC Radio 1. In 2021, singer Lady Gaga had her French Bulldogs stolen at gunpoint while they were being walked by her dogwalker.

Two stolen dogs were found in an operating room at South America's oldest university in 2009. While the university admitted using dogs for education purposes, the Dean of Peru's University of San Marcos denied that they had been paying thieves to provide dogs to use as specimens for classes.

Dog theft has evolved over the years, with one method now used by prospective criminals being to respond to adverts placed on the Internet selling puppies and entering family homes posing as purchasers to view the dogs before stealing them under threat of violence.

In December 2016, in County Tipperary, Ireland, a very valuable Greyhound with a stud value of approximately €1,000,000 was taken from his trainer's kennels. A day after the incident, armed members of the Irish police force, an Garda Síochána, recovered the dog from known criminals in county Kilkenny and it was reported that a ransom had been sought. The kidnapping was likened to the 1980s disappearance of racehorse Shergar.

Dog theft puts a financial strain on the owners, with 2024 research suggesting that the process of searching for a lost pet can cost the owner up to $1,000.

== Theft for dogfighting ==
In illegal dog fighting in the United Kingdom, stolen pets, such as smaller dogs and cats are used as "bait" to train canines for fights.

In regards to illegal dog fighting in the United States, National Geographic noted that there are no statistics on how many pets are taken and used as bait by dog fighting rings each year. Patricia Wagner, head of the National Illegal Animal Fighting Task Force for the Humane Society of the United States, offered the statement "I think every state has a problem with it, whether they know it or not."

== Prevention ==
Dogs can be fitted with microchip implants that make them identifiable if they are found. This enables a dog to be identified unless the chip has been removed or has degraded, been assimilated or otherwise been deactivated. Similar methods such as DNA sampling or ear-tattooing are used to identify individual animals and to deter thieves. Other prevention devices include flashing lights on the dog's collar and strong leashes locked to the collar. Other non-technical methods include not leaving a dog outside a store (especially tied up) on their own or unattended in a vehicle, not leaving them unattended in a garden or yard or at least keeping them in view, training a dog to come back if called and not letting them off a leash if the owner is uncertain he or she will come back.

Prior to modern identification techniques being introduced, it was suggested that dogs should be tattooed with a unique identification mark. Different organisations used different marks; for instance, the National Dog Registry suggested that the owner's social security number should be used, whereas the American Kennel Club stated that the registry number of the dog should be tattooed inside the hind leg near the body; the United Kennel Club suggesting a similar use of their registry numbers.

In March 2021, Nottinghamshire Police became the first police force in the United Kingdom to appoint a dedicated dog theft lead. As well as taking a leading role in investigating cases of dog theft, the inspector will work with Nottinghamshire Police’s Dog Section to produce advice for owners on how to keep their pet safe, and develop a 'Canine Coalition’ with dog welfare organisations to work together to both tackle the scourge of dog theft locally, and lobby Government for tougher sentences for those involved in dog theft.

== See also ==
- Springfield, Ohio, cat-eating hoax
