= John H. Callahan =

- Born: January 25, 1845; Shelby County, Kentucky, US
- Died: March 13, 1914 (aged 69); Manhattan, Kansas, US
- Burial place: Sunset Cemetery, Manhattan, Kansas
- Military career
- Allegiance: United States of America; Union
- Branch: United States Army; Union Army
- Service years: 1862 - 1865
- Rank: Private
- Unit: 122nd Illinois Volunteer Infantry Regiment
- Conflicts: American Civil War: Battle of Fort Blakeley
- Awards: Medal of Honor

John H. Callahan (January 25, 1845 – March 13, 1914) was one of two men from the 122nd Illinois Volunteer Infantry Regiment to receive the Medal of Honor during the American Civil War. Callahan was a private in Company B. The medal was awarded for capturing a Confederate flag during the Battle of Fort Blakeley on April 9, 1865; he was one of fourteen men awarded with the Medal of Honor at this battle.

Callahan joined the Army in August 1862, and was mustered out in July 1865.

He died on March 13, 1914, in Manhattan, Kansas and is buried in Sunset Cemetery.

== Medal of Honor citation ==

Rank and organization. Private, Company B, 122nd Illinois Infantry. Place and date: At Fort Blakeley, Ala., 9 April 1865. Entered service at : Macoupin County, Ill. Birth: Shelby County, Ky. Date of issue: 8 June 1865.

Citation:

Capture of flag.

== See also ==
- List of Medal of Honor recipients
- List of American Civil War Medal of Honor recipients: A–F
