= Frederick Erickson =

- Occupations: Professor, education researcher

Frederick Erickson is the George F. Kneller Professor Emeritus of Education and Anthropology at the University of California, Los Angeles.
