= Co-construction (linguistics) =

In linguistics, a co-construction is a single syntactic entity in conversation and discourse that is uttered by two or more speakers. Other names for this concept include collaboratively built sentences, sentences-in-progress, and joint utterance constructions. Used in this specific linguistic context, co-construction is not to be confused with the broader social interactional sense of the same name. Co-construction is studied across several linguistic sub-disciplines, including applied linguistics, conversation analysis, linguistic anthropology, and language acquisition.

== Types ==
Co-construction may be broadly divided into two main forms, namely completions and expansions. The key difference between the two is that completions are performed on utterances that are syntactically incomplete, whereas expansions are added onto constructions that are otherwise grammatically whole in themselves.

=== Completion ===
Completion refers to the process of an interlocutor continuing or finishing a syntactic unit left incomplete by the first speaker. For example:

Person A: Excuse me, you could direct me to the, um...
Person B: Bathroom?
Person A: Yes, thank you.

A completion is grammatically coherent with the first speaker's utterance, and brings it to conclusion. Colloquially, this notion is also known as finishing another person's thought.

=== Expansion ===
Expansion refers to the process of a speech participant augmenting an already syntactically complete utterance made by another speaker. This can occur in a number of ways, including but not limited to, the addition of a prepositional phrase or dependent clause. An example:

Speaker 1: I went- I went to, uh Escondido Friday.
Speaker 2: With John.

== Projectability ==
Speakers rely on certain processes to determine how to co-construct an utterance initiated by another speaker. These subtle cues allow for the projection of a possible end to the utterance.

=== Syntactic projectability ===
Syntax plays a key role in co-construction, in that speech participants may use the grammatical structure of another speaker's utterance to predict how it may be continued and/or finished. Based on syntactic organization of the ongoing utterance, the listener is able to identify a class of permissible sentence 'completers'. In English, subordinating conjunctions such as if, when, or once occurring before a clause can clue the listener in to the sequential possibility of anticipatory completion.

In Japanese, co-construction is made possible through projection of the end of an utterance via modal verbs and conjunctions. Modal verbs such as どうも (dōmo, 'somehow'), どうやら (dōyara, 'somehow'), and 何となく (nan to naku, 'somehow') are associated with sentence endings, thereby allowing the listener to project the possible completion of an ongoing utterance. Similarly, conjunctions such as ので (no de 'because'), から (kara 'because'), and ものですから (mono desu kara 'because') are each conventionally followed by a clause that varies depending on which is used. As such, the usage of one particular conjunctive expression allows interlocutors to project a possible ending to the first speaker's ongoing sentence.

=== Semantic projectability ===
The semantic and pragmatic content of an ongoing utterance may also allow listeners to project its possible trajectory, thereby aiding in their understanding of how co-construction may be attempted. Lexical constructions play a vital role in this process, by beginning a fragment of information that needs to be finished. In English, such cues may manifest in the likes of for example which prompts further elaboration, or she's called which projects a proper noun. Connecting conjunctions such as but or however also project certain lexical contrasts that suggests to listeners what sort of semantic content might follow.

== Factors that determine when co-construction may take place ==
It has been acknowledged that the projected syntax of an utterance is, by itself, insufficient for co-construction to take place. This is because while a class of possible completers may be located, syntax alone does not specify which particular completer should be employed, nor does it indicate which would be appropriate given any interactional context. Instead, participants rely on a much larger pool of linguistic and non-linguistic resources for the successful application of co-construction, such as prosodic cues, body language, and the semantic and pragmatic content of what is being said.

== Applications ==
Co-construction occurs frequently in everyday speech, but rarely does it occur at random. When employed properly, it can be used to the speaker's benefit to achieve specific conversational goals, such as getting the interlocuter to divulge more information or attempting to claim the next turn. Some real-life applications of co-construction are listed below.

=== Language acquisition ===
One area where co-construction is used frequently is in language acquisition. Language acquisition refers to the period when human infants start to learn how to comprehend and use language. During this period, the speech of caretakers (often referred to as baby talk) is embellished with many co-constructions. This is done in hopes of getting the child to learn and pick up on the rules of a language through their caretaker's utterances, while at the same time encouraging the child to take part in the co-construction of a conversation.

The type of co-construction typically used in language acquisition is expansions. An example can be found below:

Mother: And what did he do to you to scare you when he did that?
Child: He [4×] didn’t scare me!
Mother: He was fooling.
Child: I knowed that. Liked when he do that.
Mother: I know you like it.

=== Second language learning ===
Second language (L2) learning, also known as second-language acquisition, usually refers to the process one undergoes to learn a language they were not exposed to from birth. In contrast, language acquisition usually refers to the picking up of one's first language (L1) — a language (or languages) that they've been exposed to since birth.

Similar to language acquisition, co-construction is used frequently in second language learning. Co-constructions help to promote learning of the target language by showing learners what are the possible words/phrases/sentences that can be used in specific utterances or topics of conversation. Co-constructions can also be used to correct learners' syntax, vocabulary or grammar, ultimately increasing learners' knowledge of the target language.

The type of co-constructions used in second language learning is typically completions. Below is an example of the use of co-construction in the conversation between two L2 learners of Japanese:

Speaker 1:

日本人 の し あー 考える の 方々 は
niohnjin no shi aa kangaeru no kata wa
Japanese LK do uhm think LK way TOP
'Japanese way of thinking is'

Speaker 2:

考え方 そう そう そう
kangaekata. soo soo soo
way.of.thinking so so so
'Way of thinking. Right, right, right.'

Speaker 1:

中国人 の か
Chuugokujin no ka-
Chinese LK ?
'Chinese...'

Speaker 2:

考え方
kangaekata
way.of.thinking
'Way of thinking'

Speaker 1:

ちがいます
chigaimasu
different
'Different.'

In the above excerpt, speaker 2 completes speaker 1's incomplete utterance with "考え方" (kangaekata 'way of thinking') when speaker 1 struggles with finding the word in his second utterance. Following speaker 2's co-construction, speaker 1 continues the conversation by adding what he initially meant to say. In this conversation, speaker 1 is telling speaker 2 that the Chinese's way of thinking differs from the Japanese's.

=== Turn-taking in conversation ===
A conversation typically involves two or more speakers. In order to avoid disruptive interruptions, speakers need to be able to predict when an utterance by another speaker is possibly complete. These points in conversations are referred to as Transition Relevance Place (TRP). Participants in a conversation can predict where a possible TRP might occur using semantic and syntactic cues present in another speaker's utterance.

Speakers can construct and allocate opportunities to speak in conversations through turn-taking organization. This can be done through completions or expansions.
