= Earl Woods =

Father of American golfer Tiger Woods (1932–2006)

Earl D. Woods
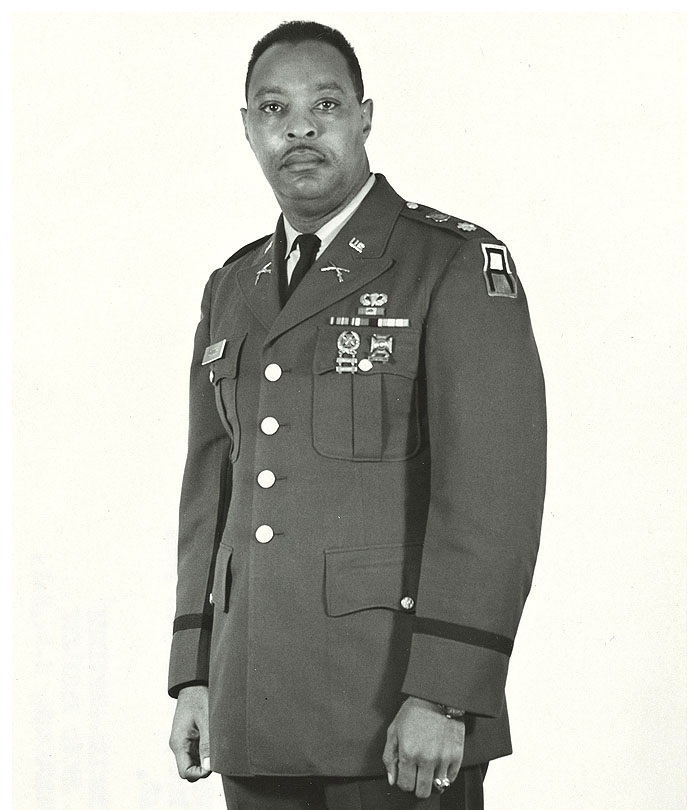
- Official U.S. Army portrait
- Born: Earl Dennison Woods; March 5, 1932; Manhattan, Kansas, U.S.
- Died: May 3, 2006 (aged 74); Cypress, California, U.S.
- Burial place: Manhattan, Kansas
- Spouse(s): Barbara Gary (m. 1954; div. 1968) Kultida Punsawad (m. 1969)
- Children: 4, including Tiger
- Relatives: Cheyenne Woods (granddaughter)
- Military career
- Allegiance: United States of America
- Branch: United States Army
- Service years: 1954–1974
- Rank: Lieutenant colonel
- Units: United States Army Special Forces; Military Assistance Command, Vietnam
- Conflicts: Vietnam War
- Awards: See awards

Earl Dennison Woods (March 5, 1932 – May 3, 2006) was a U.S. Army infantry officer and father of American professional golfer Tiger Woods. Woods started his son in golf at a very early age and coached him exclusively over his first years in the sport. He later published two books about the process.

Woods served two tours of duty in South Vietnam and retired with the rank of lieutenant colonel. He was also a college baseball player. Woods' granddaughter, Cheyenne Woods, is also a professional golfer.

== Early life ==
Woods was born in Manhattan, Kansas. His father, Miles Woods, had five children by his first wife, Viola, and six more (of whom Earl was the youngest) by his second, Maude Carter. Miles was an epileptic who worked as a street cleaner and caretaker. Although his father was a devout Baptist, Miles also had a reputation for being able to swear for 30 minutes without interruption. Woods once remarked, "I picked up on that." His father was African-American and his mother, Maude (Carter) Woods, was of mixed African-American and European ancestry and was lighter-skinned. The Times described Woods as "a quarter Native American, a quarter Chinese and half African American", the former through a Cherokee grandparent.

=== College, sports, and segregation ===
Woods attended Kansas State University (then known as Kansas State College) and played baseball, earning a varsity letter in both 1952 and 1953. His teammate Larry Hartshorn recalled how Woods once was not allowed to play at a college in Mississippi because of his race. The entire Kansas State baseball team refused to play and left in protest.

Woods broke the Big Eight Conference (then the Big Seven Conference) "color barrier" in baseball in 1951. He usually played as a catcher, and was offered a contract by the Kansas City Monarchs of the Negro leagues. However, Woods decided to continue his education, graduating in 1953 with a BS in sociology, and was commissioned as an officer in the U.S. Army.

== Mid life ==
=== Military career ===
Woods served two combat tours during the Vietnam War, the first as an infantry officer and the second with the United States Army Special Forces.

After graduating from the Defense Information School and being promoted to lieutenant colonel, Woods was assigned as an instructor of Military Science & Tactics, (Army ROTC) at the City College of New York. He retired from active duty in 1974.

Woods moved to Southern California, and became an employee of McDonnell Douglas Corp in Huntington Beach, California.

=== Marriages ===
Woods married Barbara Gary on May 18, 1954, in Abilene, Kansas. They had three children: Earl Dennison Jr. (1955), Kevin Dale (1957), and Royce Renee (1961). Earl Jr.'s daughter, Cheyenne Woods, is also a professional golfer, and received some coaching from her father. Woods and Gary divorced in 1968 in Ciudad Juárez, Mexico.

Woods had met his second wife, Kultida Punsawad (Thai: กุลธิดา พันธ์สวัสดิ์; RTGS: Kunthida Phansawat), while stationed in Thailand in 1966. Punsawad, who was half Thai, a quarter Chinese, and a quarter Dutch, was from Kanchanaburi. They got married in 1969 in Brooklyn, New York. Their son, Eldrick, was born in 1975. His son's nickname, Tiger, comes from Woods' wartime friendship with Lieutenant Colonel Vuong Dang "Tiger" Phong, an officer who served in the Army of the Republic of Vietnam.

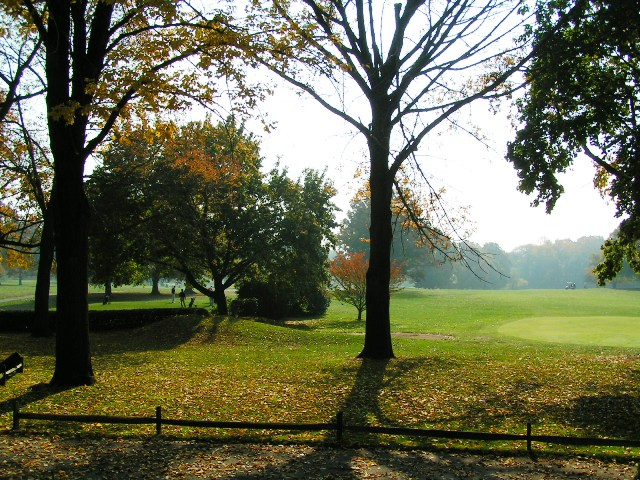
The view of the Dyker Beach Golf Course, in Dyker Heights, Brooklyn

=== Teaching golf to his son ===
In 1972, Woods was stationed at Brooklyn's Fort Hamilton, and learned to play golf, starting at age 42, at the Dyker Beach Golf Course in Dyker Heights. From his first experience with golf, Woods was captivated by it, and played a great deal for the remainder of his life. He eventually became a good standard amateur golfer, often scoring in the 70s for 18 holes. Woods claimed to be playing close to scratch handicap level when his son Tiger was born in late 1975. Coached by his father, Tiger Woods was introduced to golf in Orange County, California before age two, and became a child prodigy in golf, perhaps the most precocious young golfer in history. Tiger learned golf first on the U.S. military courses in southern California.

Woods shared the techniques he used in coaching his son Tiger in two books: Training a Tiger: A Father's Guide to Raising a Winner in Both Golf and Life (co-written with Pete McDaniel), and Playing Through: Straight Talk on Hard Work, Big Dreams and Adventures with Tiger. Woods coached Tiger exclusively until age five, then sought professional assistance from Rudy Duran and John Anselmo, both well-regarded PGA club professionals in the area. In 1993, following Tiger's third straight title in the U.S. Junior Amateur, his father sought out superstar teacher Butch Harmon to develop Tiger's game further. Harmon, upon meeting Tiger for the first time in Houston in summer 1993, praised the coaching which his father, Duran, and Anselmo had undertaken to that point.

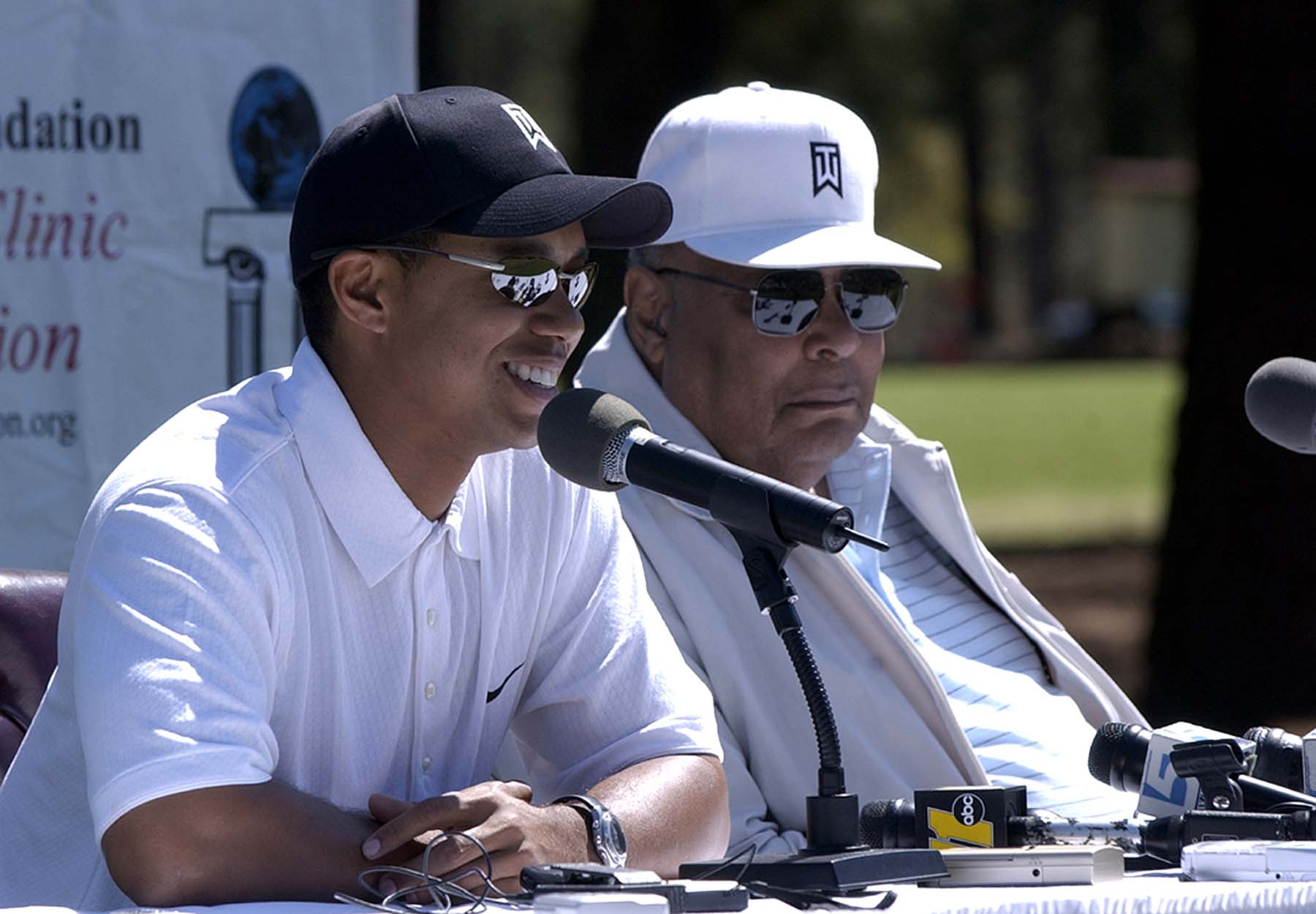
Tiger and Earl Woods during a 2004 press conference at Fort Bragg

Woods retired from his second career working at McDonnell Douglas in Huntington Beach, California in 1988. He traveled to Tiger's events as often as possible for the rest of his life. Woods hired Connecticut attorney John Merchant in 1996 to help facilitate the path for Tiger to turn professional, and to secure lucrative sponsorship agreements when he did so. Merchant had been the first African American member of the United States Golf Association's Executive Committee. Tiger signed deals with Nike, Titleist, and the International Management Group, which made him a multi-millionaire as soon as he declared professional status in late August 1996. Tiger's deals broke by a wide margin all records for sponsorship money in golf. Soon after Tiger turned professional, Merchant was fired by Earl Woods.

== Illnesses and death ==
Woods was diagnosed with prostate cancer in 1998. He died on May 3, 2006, from a heart attack at his home in Cypress, California at age 74. Woods was buried at Sunset Cemetery in Manhattan, Kansas.

The Earl Woods National Youth Golf Academy at Colbert Hills Golf Course in Manhattan, Kansas is named in his honor. It was host to the first First Tee National Academy in 2000.

== Posthumous Nike commercial ==
On April 8, 2010, Nike released a television commercial, created by the Wieden + Kennedy ad agency, featuring the somber face of Tiger Woods (depicted in black and white) and the voice of Earl Woods. The audio track of the commercial was taken from a 2004 interview of Earl for the documentary DVD Tiger: The Authorized DVD Collection, in which Earl discussed comparing the "authoritative" nature of his wife, Kultida, to his own "inquisitive" nature. The commercial utilized a sound bite from that interview as a backdrop to the camera capture of Tiger's face, and it was widely interpreted as a skewing of Earl's words to posthumously address Tiger's own marital issues, which had recently come to light; the commercial was released on the same day that Tiger had made his anticipated return to competition at the Masters Tournament following a five-month self-imposed absence during the resulting public fallout, and was the first to feature Tiger's participation since the scandal broke.

Reactions to the commercial varied widely, with criticisms being particularly leveled at Nike for utilizing Tiger's own domestic issues for commercial gain and plaudits being forwarded to Tiger for addressing how the scandal had affected him both in private and public life.

== Military awards ==
- Parachutist Badge
- Bronze Star Medal
- Army Commendation Medal
- Army of Occupation Medal
- National Defense Service Medal with oak leaf cluster
- Armed Forces Expeditionary Medal
- Vietnam Service Medal
- Armed Forces Reserve Medal with hour glass device
- Vietnam Cross of Gallantry
- Republic of Vietnam Campaign Medal
