= Educational anthropology =

Educational anthropology, or the anthropology of education, is a subfield of sociocultural anthropology that focuses on the role of culture in education and how educational settings shape social processes and cultural relations. To do so, educational anthropologists focus on education and multiculturalism, educational pluralism, culturally relevant pedagogy, and native methods of learning and socializing, and the education of marginal and peripheral communities within large nation-states. Overall, educational anthropology is often considered an applied subfield of sociocultural anthropology, as the focus of educational anthropology is on improving the teaching and learning process within classroom settings.

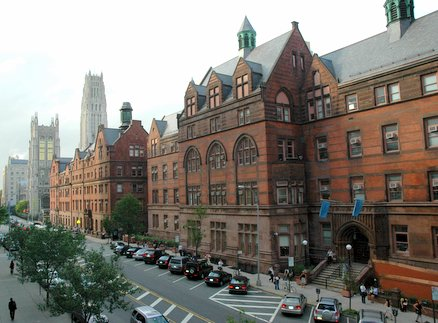
View of Teachers College of Columbia University in New York across 120th Street taken in 2004.

Educational anthropology is largely associated with the pioneering work of Margaret Mead and later, George Spindler, Solon Kimball, Dell Hymes, and Jean Lave. The formative years of educational anthropology (1925-1954) were defined by ethnography in classrooms, which maintained the view of the researcher as a detached observer and grew out of research on Native American personality, education, and administration. During the 1970s, educational anthropology became more consolidated as a field of study due to the influence of professors at Teachers College, Columbia University.

== Theories and methods ==
As education involves understandings of who we are, the field is centrally concerned with cultural transmission. Cultural transmission involves the transfer of a sense of identity, both individual and collective, between generations, sometimes through enculturation and sometimes through acculturation. Accordingly, educational anthropology has become increasingly focused on ethnic identity and cultural change and transformation.

Ethnography remains the primary mode of fieldwork within anthropological studies of education. Educational studies have historically been critiqued for relying too heavily on statistical and other quantitative data to make sweeping claims; however, early educational anthropologists emphasized the importance of participant observation as an ethnographic method to contextualize schooling practices. In the 1970s, three foci of anthropological ethnographies of education were articulated as follows: (1) the relationship between schools and their sociocultural contexts; (2) processes and practices of teaching and learning; and (3) the relationships between students, between teachers, and between teachers and students.

Although a wide variety of anthropological theorizations of pedagogy and educational praxis persist, three frameworks are central to understanding educational anthropology as a field. The first is the cultural deficit framework, which posits that students have internal deficiencies limiting their educational achievement that stem from their culture, linguistic background, family, and personal traits, among many other factors. This model of thinking places responsibility upon individuals, rather than educational institutions themselves, for student success. The second, cultural difference theory, posits that students from different cultures approach and understand education differently, shaped by their upbringing and cultural beliefs, values, and traditions. The third, cultural ecological theory, considers the broad impacts of culture, the sociocultural settings of educational institutions, and the historical ramifications of economic, social, and educational inequality to fully contextualize each student's encounter with schooling.

Questions of minority education have dominated educational anthropological thinking in the 21st century, particularly regarding multilingual students. As a result, educational anthropology has increasingly grappled with ideas of culturally relevant, responsive, and sustaining pedagogies, which are intended to value the social, linguistic, and cultural capital of minority students and their communities.

== History of educational anthropology ==
Educational anthropology is typically considered to have originated in the mid-1920s, with field consolidation in the 1950s and 1960s that spurred the theoretical shifts that define the field into the present. The history of the field is intertwined with the history of Teachers College, Columbia University. In 1896, Franz Boas established the department of anthropology at Columbia; it was only two years later, in 1898, that Teachers College was founded. Although it was not until 1935 that a course entitled "Anthropology and Education" was offered, some students trained in both programs, including Elsie Clews Parsons. In 1947, Margaret Mead began a formal relationship with Teachers College from the department of anthropology. This mirrored the change to the overall field, in which Anthropology and Education (and the corresponding Council on Anthropology and Education) were formed by Margaret Mead, Solon Kimball, and Conrad Arensberg at Columbia, as well as George Spindler and colleagues at Stanford.

In the 1930s, ethnographic research on the educational forms of the Tallensi and Tikopia people was conducted and published by United Kingdom-based anthropologists Meyer Fortes and Raymond Firth. However, there was limited crossover between American cultural anthropologists and British social anthropologists studying educational forms and functions until World War II, which fundamentally altered the geographic and theoretical scope of American cultural anthropology.

In 1954, George Spindler convened the first Educational Anthropology Conference at Stanford, which moved educational anthropology out of its formative years and into the field consolidation that defined the 1960s. As such, Education and Anthropology (1955), edited by George Spindler, is upheld as one of the earliest texts that argued for and illustrated the distinct presence of educational anthropology as a subfield of cultural anthropology. This edited work is a report of the 1954 conference and includes papers including "Anthropology and Education: An Overview" (George Spindler), "The Method of Natural History and Education Research" (Solon Kimball), and "Discrepancies in the Teaching of American Culture" (Dorothy Lee).

Into the 1960s, educational anthropology encountered two key Marxist critiques of education. One was a structural Marxist critique of capitalist schooling and school socialization as a means of producing obedient workers; the other was the rise of Paulo Freire's liberation theology and transformational praxis. Although Freire's work was taken up in force by scholars such as Henry Giroux and Peter McLaren, many educational anthropologists did not engage closely with the Marxist critique of class formation in the 1970s, choosing instead to address deficit ideologies of non-hegemonic cultural and linguistic practices within schools.

Into the 1980s, anthropological theorizations of culture shifted to emphasize the role of practice and performance within culture, including the work of Sherry Ortner (1984) and George Marcus and Michael Fischer (1986). These coincided with the rise of European sociology of education, which frequently references the work of Pierre Bourdieu and Antonio Gramsci. This change influenced how educational anthropologists thought about education in terms of cultural production and class culture.

The 1990s saw a surge in educational anthropology that examined the role educational institutions play in promoting social justice and began to adopt activist, engaged stances in their work. This has led to educational ethnographies that take on participatory action research and other collaborative methodologies to address the reification of inequity within schooling. In tandem with this shift, more research has examined minority and multilingual education, shifting toward culturally sustaining, relevant, and responsive pedagogies. These pedagogical considerations persist into the present day.

== Council on Anthropology and Education (CAE) ==
The Council on Anthropology and Education is the section of the American Anthropological Association (AAA) that is dedicated to the study of schooling within its sociocultural contexts. Founded in 1968, the CAE presents its mission as necessarily responsive to oppression and social injustice in ways that bring together educators, anthropologists, and interdisciplinary scholars to fight for equitable educational systems. Their peer-reviewed journal, Anthropology & Education Quarterly (AEQ), is one of the 15 journals the AAA makes available through AnthroSource. There are 15 interest groups within CAE:

- Ethnography of Schools and Communities
  Council on Anthropology and Education
  - Abbreviation: CAE
  - Formation: 1968
  - Headquarters: Arlington, Virginia, U.S.
  - Region served: United States of America
  - Products: Anthropology & Education Quarterly
  - President: Angelina E. Castagno
  - Parent organization: American Anthropological Association
  - Budget: $200,000 USD
  - Website: https://cae.americananthro.org/
- Multilingualism, (Multi)Literacies and Language in Schools and Communities
- Anthropology of Post-Secondary Education
- Cultural Learning and Transmission
- African Americans, African Diaspora and Education
- Latin@s/x and Education
- Indigenous Education
- Asians, Pacific Islanders, and Asian Americans in Education
- Gender and Sexuality in Schools and Society
- International Issues, (Im)migration, Transnationalism and Citizenship in Educational Contexts
- Disability Studies in Education
- Privatization, Markets, and (Post-)Neoliberalism in Educational Contexts
- Anthropology of Environmental and Science Education
- Ethnography of Educational Policies and Systems
- Adult Teaching and Learning Communities, Workplaces, and Schools

Additionally, 7 annual awards are offered each year by CAE:

- George and Louise Spindler Award
- Concha Delgado Gaitán CAE Presidential Fellows Award
- Douglas Foley Early Career Award
- CAE Outstanding Book Award
- Frederick Erikson Outstanding Dissertation Award
- Shirley Brice Health Travel Award
- CAE Studies in Educational Ethnography Travel Award

== Journals ==
Prominent journals in the field include Anthropology & Education Quarterly, Education & Culture, the Ethnography and Education Journal, and Pedagogy, Culture, and Society.
