= Solon Toothaker Kimball =

Dr. Solon T. Kimball
- Born: August 12, 1909; Manhattan, Kansas
- Died: October 12, 1982 (aged 73); Gainesville, Florida
- Education: Kansas State University Harvard University
- Awards: Guggenheim Fellowship
- Scientific career
- Fields: Anthropology; Educational anthropology Applied anthropology Community studies
- Workplaces: Office of Indian Affairs; War Relocation Authority Michigan State University; University of Alabama; Columbia University; University of Florida
- Doctoral advisor: W. Lloyd Warner

Solon Toothaker Kimball (August 12, 1909 – October 12, 1982) was an American anthropologist and educator. He was a pioneer in community studies, applied anthropology, and educational anthropology. Many of the research methods he developed remain commonplace in anthropological studies of communities and social classes.

== Early life and education ==
Kimball was born on August 12, 1909 in Manhattan, Kansas to Charles Augustus and Matie Kimball (née Toothaker). He attended Kansas State University and graduated with a B.S. in journalism in 1930 before beginning his graduate studies at Harvard University in 1933 under anthropologist W. Lloyd Warner. Kimball worked alongside fellow student Conrad Arensberg as Warner's field assistant during the latter's "Yankee City" studies in Newburyport, Massachusetts, where he began developing his lifelong focus on associations like cliques and clubs as primary environments for knowledge transmission and creation. In 1934, he received a Sheldon Traveling Fellowship from Harvard to study agricultural social structures in County Clare, Ireland as part of a team under Warner and Earnest Hooton. He and Arensberg would later coauthor the book Family and Community in Ireland in 1940 based on the results of this study.

== Work with the OIA and WRA ==
After receiving his doctorate from Harvard in 1936, Kimball briefly took a position in the Department of Agriculture's Soil Conservation service before transferring to the Office of Indian Affairs, where he applied his "task group" approach to the sociology of communities to studies of Navajo land use as the OIA's section head for the Navajo reservation in Window Rock, Arizona from 1936 to 1942. In this position, he worked with fellow anthropologist John Provinse to develop a conservation plan in collaboration with Navajo leadership, but their proposal was rejected by Navajo Indian Service staff members.

Following the outbreak of World War II and the subsequent internment of Japanese Americans, Kimball moved into a position at the Poston War Relocation Center in southwestern Arizona, which was under the joint administration of the OIA and the War Relocation Authority. He was transferred in July of 1942 to work as the head of the Community Organization section of the WRA's Community Management Division in San Francisco until November of the same year, when he briefly served as acting director of the Manzanar internment camp near Los Angeles from November 5th through the 24th. Kimball then moved into a position as head of the Community Government and Activities unit under his former colleague John Provinse at the WRA's Washington office, working to develop policies for limited self-government within the camps and making frequent visits to them until leaving the position in August of 1945. He rarely discussed this period of his career, and wrote about what he saw as the destructive effect of the internment camps on their prisoners' traditional community systems as well as the resistance expressed through the communities that formed within them in a paper titled Building New Communities During War Time which he co-authored with Provinse in American Sociological Review in 1946.

== Academic career ==
Following his departure from the WRA, Kimball worked as an associate professor at Michigan State University beginning in 1945, studying the area's rural agricultural communities and their interactions with encroaching urban communities in the newly developing suburban environment. In 1948 Kimball took a position as head of the University of Alabama's newly established Department of Sociology and Anthropology, accompanied in his move from MSU by his colleague and fellow WRA veteran Asael T. Hansen. During his time in Alabama, he developed the research method of event analysis through his collaborative work with Marion Pearsall, which focused on responses to a community-driven public health survey in the town of Talladega. The two co-authored the book The Talladega Story in 1954 based on their findings, in which Kimball developed further his focus on communities through an analysis of socioeconomic divisions and the modes of knowledge transmission within and between them which he saw as exercising a strong influence on the patterns of thought characteristic to each.

In 1953, he moved into a position as a professor of anthropology and education at Teachers College, Columbia University, where he established his central interest in educational anthropology as well as working in international development as an educational consultant in Puerto Rico, Saudi Arabia, Brazil, East Africa, and Peru. His work at Teachers College built upon his earlier focus on communities and "task forces" as loci of knowledge transmission to develop a theory of educational anthropology, expressed in his book Education and the New America which he co-authored with philosopher John E. McClellan in 1962. He worked to foster collaboration between educators and anthropologists through publications like his Anthropology and Education series and his articles in the Teachers College Record, as well as serving from 1953 to 1954 as the president of the Society for Applied Anthropology, of which he was a founding member.

In 1966, he moved to the University of Florida to take the position of Graduate Research Professor, continuing his work in educational anthropology with an increasing focus on its biological and neurological foundations, as well as participating frequently in scholarship and professional organizations. He was awarded a Guggenheim Fellowship in 1966 as well as serving as the president of the American Ethnological Society from 1970 to 1971. In 1973 he edited the volume Learning and Culture with Jacquetta Hill-Burnett, and he published a collection of his articles on the subject of anthropology and education as Culture and the Educative Process in 1974. In 1978, he established a fellowship program at the University of Florida in honor of Zora Neale Hurston. He published his final book, The Craft of Community Study, in 1979 in collaboration with William Partridge, solidifying his concept of collaborative productivity as a means of self-realization and cultural development through an analysis of Partridge's development from graduate student to colleague through his field study in Colombia. From 1979 to 1980 he served as president of the Southern Anthropological Society, and he was named Teacher/Scholar of the Year by the University of Florida in 1980. That same year, he retired and became a Professor Emeritus at the university, a position he held until his death two years later. Since 1984, the Solon T. Kimball Award for Public and Applied Anthropology has been presented biennially by the American Anthropological Association to an individual or team whose work has contributed significantly to applied anthropology and public policy. Its creation was supported by the royalties from the volume Applied Anthropology in America, which was dedicated to Kimball and edited by his former student and collaborator William Partridge along with Elizabeth M. Eddy.

== Personal life ==
Kimball married Hannah Price in Boston in 1935 and had two children with her. His daughter Sally was born in 1938 and his son John Price was born three years later in 1941; John Price would die suddenly in 1977. Kimball was raised without a specific religious affiliation and remained non-religious throughout his life. He died due to congestive heart failure on October 12, 1982, in Gainesville, Florida. He had been nominated for the Society of Applied Anthropology's Bronislaw Malinowski Award, but died before he could receive it.
