= George Spindler =

George Dearborn Spindler was a leading figure in 20th-century anthropology and regarded as the founder of the anthropology of education. He edited a very large series of short monographs, turning nearly every significant ethnographic text of the 20th century into a shorter work accessible to the public and to anthropology students everywhere. He was one of the first to teach courses on the anthropology of American culture (culture of the United States). Nearly all of his publications and activities were in collaboration with his wife, Louise.

Spindler was originally trained as a psychologist, but departed from traditional psychological methods to do participant-observation with the Menominee.

He was at one time the editor of American Anthropologist, as well as the author of over 40 books, book chapters, and 224 anthropology case studies. He died on July 1, 2014, at the age of 94 (Turan, 2014)
