= Conrad Phillip Kottak =

American anthropologist

Conrad Phillip Kottak (born October 6, 1942, in Atlanta, Georgia) is an American anthropologist. Kottak is currently a professor emeritus of anthropology at the University of Michigan, where he has been teaching since 1968. He received his Ph.D. from Columbia University, and he did extensive research in Brazil and Madagascar, visiting societies there and writing books about them.

He then wrote several textbooks, including Window on Humanity: A Concise Introduction to Anthropology; Madagascar: Society and History, and Anthropology: The Exploration of Human Diversity and Cultural Anthropology, which are often used by colleges and high schools in the United States. He believes that various American legends and stories, such as Star Trek, Star Wars and the Thanksgiving story are growing into a type of mythology which someday might be comparable to Greek, Roman, or other stories which today are considered to be myths.

Kottak has received several honors for his work. Among these awards is an excellence in teaching award by the College of Literature, Sciences, and the Arts of the University of Michigan in 1992, and the American Anthropological Association (AAA)/Mayfield Award for Excellence in the Undergraduate Teaching of Anthropology in 1999. He was elected to the membership of the National Academy of Sciences in 2008. According to the Open Syllabus Project, Kottak is the most frequently cited author on college syllabi for anthropology courses.

== Books ==
- Madagascar: Society and History (1986, Carolina Academic Press / Wenner-Gren Foundation for Anthropological Research) (ISBN 0890892520)
- Researching American Culture: A Guide for Student Anthropologists (1982, The University of Michigan Press) (ISBN 0472080245)
- The Past and Present: History, Ecology, and Cultural Variation in Highland Madagascar (1980, The University of Michigan Press) (ISBN 0472063235)
- Prime-Time Society: An Anthropological Analysis of Television and Culture (October 2009, Left Coast Press) (ISBN 1598743694)
- Assault on Paradise: Social Change in a Brazilian Village (1999, McGraw-Hill) (ISBN 9780072901801)
- Anthropology: The Exploration of Human Diversity and Cultural Anthropology (2003)
- Physical Anthropology and Archaeology (2003, McGraw-Hill) (ISBN 0072863668)
- Mirror for Humanity: A Concise Introduction to Cultural Anthropology (McGraw-Hill, 2013 15th Edition) (ISBN 0078035015)
- On Being Different: Diversity and Multiculturalism in the North American Mainstream (with co-author Kathryn A. Kozaitis) (2003, McGraw-Hill) (ISBN 0078117011)

The list is from his profile at umich.
