= Cultural learning =

Passing on of information from one group of people or animals to another

Cultural learning is the way a group of people or animals within a society or culture tend to learn and pass on information. Learning styles can be greatly influenced by how a culture socializes with its children and young people. Cross-cultural research in the past fifty years has primarily focused on differences between Eastern and Western cultures. Some scholars believe that cultural learning differences may be responses to the physical environment in the areas in which a culture was initially founded. These environmental differences include climate, migration patterns, war, agricultural suitability, and endemic pathogens. Cultural evolution, upon which cultural learning is built, is believed to be a product of only the past 10,000 years and to hold little connection to genetics.

== Overview ==
Van Schaik and Burkart point out that cultural learning allows individuals to acquire skills that they would be unable to do independently over the course of their development. Cultural learning is believed to be particularly important for humans. Humans are weaned at an early age compared to the emergence of adult dentition. The immaturity of dentition and the digestive system, the time required for growth of the brain, and the rapid skeletal growth needed for the young to reach adult height and strength mean that children have special digestive needs and are dependent on adults for a long period of time. This time of dependence also allows time for cultural learning to occur before passage into adulthood.

In the context of evolutionary psychology, cultural learning assumes importance for modern humans as an obligate cultural species.

Cultural learning depends on people developing, remembering, and dealing with ideas. Humans adopt and apply specific systems of symbolic meaning. Cultures have been compared to sets of control mechanisms, plans, recipes, rules, or instructions. Cultural differences have been found in academic motivation, achievement, learning style, conformity, and compliance – this may suggest scope for comparative studies on cultural learning. Cultural learning relies on innovation, or the ability to develop new responses to the environment and the ability to communicate or imitate the behaviour of others. Animals that are able to solve problems and imitate the behaviour of others are therefore able to transmit information across generations.

Cultural learning can involve different social-learning mechanisms, including imitation, emulation, stimulus or local enhancement, and socially facilitated individual learning. These mechanisms differ in what is learned from others and in the fidelity with which behavioural forms are transmitted. Research on these processes is particularly important in comparative primate research and has implications for archaeology and primate archaeology, where learning mechanisms are used to interpret the origins and transmission of past behaviours.

Cass Sunstein described in 2007 how Wikipedia moves humans past the rigid limits of socialist planning that Friedrich Hayek attacked on the grounds that "no planner could possibly obtain the 'dispersed bits' of information held by individual members of society. Hayek insisted that the knowledge of individuals, taken as a whole, is far greater than that of any commission or board, however diligent and expert."

== Examples ==
An example of cultural transmission can be seen in post-World War II Japan during the American occupation of the country. There were political, economic, and social changes in Japan influenced by America. Some changes include changes to their constitution, reforms, and the consumption of media, which were influenced by American occupiers. The occupation of Japan by the Americans turned into a strong link between nations. Over time, Japanese culture began to accept American touchstones like jazz and baseball, while Americans were introduced to Japanese cuisine and entertainment.

A modern approach to cultural transmission would be that of the internet. One example would be millennials, who "are both products of their culture as well as influencers." Millennials are often the ones teaching older generations how to navigate the web. The teacher has to accommodate to the learning process of the student, in this case an older generation student, in order to transmit the information fluently and in a manner that is easier to understand. This goes hand in hand with the Communication Accommodation Theory, which "elaborates the human tendency to adjust their behaviour while interacting." The result would be that, with the help of someone else, people are able to share their newly acquired skills among people in their culture, which was not possible before.

Humans also tend to follow "communicative" ways of learning, as seen in a study by Hanna Marno, a researcher at the International School for Advanced Studies. In the study, infants followed an adult's action of pressing a button to light up a lamp based on the adult's "non-verbal (eye contact) and verbal cues."

== In non-human animals ==
External videos
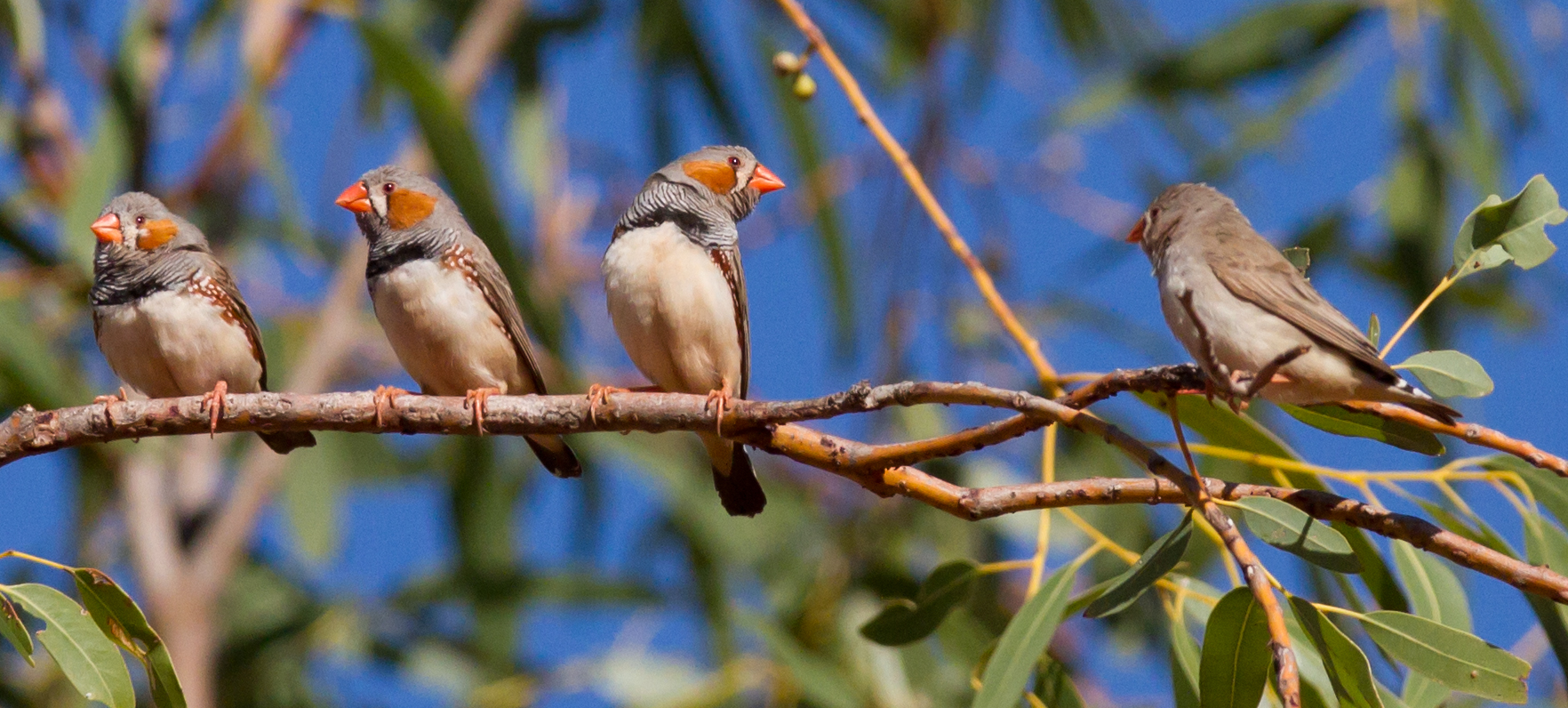
- “The cultural lives of birds”, Knowable Magazine, February 26, 2022

Enculturation can also be used to describe the raising of an animal in which the animal acquires traits and skills that would not otherwise be acquired if it were raised by another of its own species.

Cultural learning is dependent on innovation, or the ability to create new responses to the environment and the ability to communicate or imitate the behavior of others. Animals that are able to solve problems and imitate the behavior of others are therefore able to transmit information across generations. A wide variety of social animals learn from other members of their group or pack. Wolves, for example, learn multiple hunting strategies from the other pack members. A large number of bird species also engage in cultural learning; such learning is critical for the survival of some species. Dolphins also pass on knowledge about tool use.

== See also ==
- Educational anthropology
- Intercultural competence
- Intercultural communication principles
- Socialization
- Dual inheritance theory
