= Co-construction (learning) =

Collaborative approach to learning

In learning, co-construction is a distinctive approach where the emphasis is on collaborative or partnership working. The approach includes some more interactional processes such as cooperation and coordination.

Co-construction is a concept that students can use to help them learn from others and expand their knowledge. Not only does co-construction among learners assist them with growing in many areas, such as solving issues together, but it also teaches students how to form relationships with their peers and teachers. Communication and dialogue between the teacher and learners that focuses on learning is one of the approaches for co-construction. The ability for learners to accept and receive feedback as well as reflect is an important part of the learning process for the co-construction approach.

'Co-construction of learning' deepens relationships and understanding between all learning partners and can lead to School Improvement. Co-construction of learning is referred to in Primary and Secondary Schools and other learning settings in the UK, and generally refers to collaboration in learning beyond delivery of learning or projects, for example in Curriculum co-construction. Co-construction learning is considered to be "complex, multi-dimensional, and involves everyone."

The process of Co-construction is made up of three areas that all contribute to the child's education. The first is the individual child, secondly the physical and social environment of the child, and lastly the educators. These areas help to "construct" the child's knowledge and understanding of the world around them. Creative Partnerships refer to 'Co-construction of learning' as the partnership between teaching staff, pupils and creative professionals to develop and deliver creative learning in schools.

Wikipedia could also be considered a form of 'co-construction of learning.'

== Theory behind Co-construction ==
Co-construction creates environments depicting many of the same aspects Early Childhood theorists such as that of Lev Vygotsky and Jean Piaget. Vygotksy’s work was based on the ideology that “...cognitive development stems from social interactions from guided learning within the zone of proximal development as children and their partner's co-construct knowledge.” Vygotsky believed in the ideology that we know as co-construction, or building an environment where children interact with one another on a variety of levels and learning through these interactions. In order to create an atmosphere for quality interaction, students need to be prepared for situations such as collaborative learning and a culture of dialogue.

== The importance of Co-construction ==
Co-construction is important for developing creative partnerships within the classroom. In a classroom, cooperation and collaboration is very important. It can teach students how to effectively communicate with others to solve problems. Also, this is a very important skill that students need to learn later in life. Co-construction of learning allows students to have social interactions within the classroom and to have the learning be more creative.
