= Ultra-realism =

School of thought in criminology

Ultra-realism is a school of thought within the discipline of criminology and the sub-discipline of zemiology. Ultra-realists revisit the fundamental question that underpins both disciplines - why, rather than seek solidarity and cooperation, do specific individuals, groups or institutions choose to risk harm to others as they pursue their own interests?

Early proponents of the ultra-realist perspective are Steve Hall and Simon Winlow. The original ultra-realist concepts first emerged from the mid-1990s onwards in a series of articles and books. The ultra-realist theoretical framework and research-programme began to take a clearly defined shape in three later works.

== Theoretical framework ==
=== The need for revision ===
Ultra-realism is a new school of thought in western social science. Ultra-realists focus on the western way of life and its zemiological outcomes. Ultra-realism is a revisionist position constructed for the purposes of revisiting the research findings and fundamental domain assumptions of existing schools of thought to evaluate their validity and, where necessary, suggesting further investigation using ethnographic research methods and advanced concepts.

=== Basic components of the framework ===
Ultra-realism's initial empirical focus is on broad crime trends that show discernable shifts over time in various locales, regions and nations. Drawing upon the work of criminologists such as Robert K. Merton, Jock Young and Robert Reiner, they connect these trends to shifts in political economy, culture and subjectivity, investigating their forms and dynamic relations, which together create probabilistic contexts at the local, regional and national levels.

Early preparatory work undertaken before the establishment of the ultra-realist name in 2015 drew evidence from the New Deal period in the US, which between 1933 and 1937 correlated with a significant reduction of crime, violence and homicide. This contrasts with the crime explosions in the US and UK during the deindustrialization process of the 1980s. Ultra-realists analysed the decline in traditional crime from the mid-1990s in the context of advances in detection technology and surveillance and increased incarceration rates. They also researched the mutation of criminal markets, a process in which traditional crimes declined as detection and surveillance advanced while criminal markets expanded silently in the background and new forms of minimally reported and recorded crime appeared, much of it online.

Winlow's sociological work on the displacement of traditional working-class identities and cultural pursuits by those promoted by mass-mediated consumer culture indicated that changes were taking place. His research on the drift into criminality added empirical and theoretical weight to Hall's claim that the cultural context of criminality is the combined pacification and intensification of a competitive-individualist norm. Further research added detail to the historical intensification of the practices around this norm and explained how an associated subjectivity was normalised and pacified, leading to the emergence of foundational ultra-realist concepts such as the pseudo-pacification process, objectless anxiety and special liberty. Further ethnographic and theoretical work associated these socioeconomic, cultural and subjective shifts with corresponding changes in crime trends and the expansion of criminal markets.

The construction of a theoretical framework for a renewed realist analysis of trends in crime and harm led to the establishment of the ultra-realist project in 2015. Ultra-realists agreed with the left realist and early feminist position that critical criminology must take crime, harm and victims more seriously. They borrowed selected concepts from other realist schools of thought - for instance critical realism's notions of depth structures and the causative impact of absence; speculative realism's critique of correlationism and its emphasis on realist contingency and agency in the anthropecene era; Mark Fisher's notion of 'capitalist realism', a culture that normalises and reproduces the cynical, 'zero-sum' subject frequently encountered by ultra-realist ethnographers in their research. The ubiquity of an indifferent attitude towards risking harm to others amongst respondents involved in crime and criminal markets prompted ultra-realism's first move towards zemiology.

Ultra-realists drew upon Slavoj Žižek's notion of fetishistic disavowal to formulate their concept of the 'chosen unconscious', which led to the early adoption of Adrian Johnston's transcendental materialism as a basis for the ultra-realist framework. Further theoretical development was prompted by researchers' empirical findings relating to subjectivity, particularly the clear distinction between expressive and instrumental forms of special liberty. The recognition of the use of criminal or harmful means of either remaining in or leaving specific situations led to the current reformulation of the ultra-realist framework, drawing upon the concepts of homeostasis, non-suffering, sacrifice, and existential difficulties in post-normal times.

Ultra-realists replaced the Lacanian notion of 'the void' in the psyche with the fundamental 'molecular question' - to stay or go - at the root of all organisms. This is a bodily demand for a primordial action-oriented metaphysics that only the affective system's deep 'mood' emotions can translate and mediate. Because the molecular body understands only 'non-suffering' as its initial objective, the stay-go decision involves a calculation of sacrifice, which becomes mythologised to dramatize narratives and enhance the emotional credibility of any answers to the molecular question provided by experience, culture and ideology. The more persistent and committed criminals encountered by ultra-realist researchers throughout the social structure had accepted the cyncial belief that the 'zero-sum' world is natural and timeless. The onus is on individuals to stay with it and actively compete against others but avoid sacrifice at all costs by levering themselves up the hierarchy of non-suffering by any means possible, legal or otherwise.

Ultra-realists argue that criminology can make firmer contributions to the pragmatic political interventions required to stabilise economies, reduce sociosymbolic competition, transcend zero-sum subjectivity and restore ethics to the heart of economy, society, culture. In an attempt to lay the foundations for a theoretical framework that encompasses these issues, ultra-realists constructed the following new concepts specifically for criminological and zemiological research:

- The pseudo-pacification process. Hall's concept, developed since the mid-1990s in theoretical works is an alternative to Norbert Elias's concept of the 'civilizing process'. Pseudo-pacification is a process that emerged in 12th century England in the wake of major cultural, legal and socioeconomic changes. The fundamental claim is that what is mistaken for 'civilizing' momentum is a fragile by-product of the displacement of physical violence as a normative means of ordering and disrupting social systems with rule-bound sociosymbolic competition acted out in commercial life and consumer culture. The relatively early replacement of violence with pseudo-pacified competitive individualism changed trends in crime and harm, accelerated urbanisation, social atomism and marketisation, increased consumer desires and helped Britain become the first fully industrialised nation.
- Special liberty. Hall's concept of 'special liberty' is a socially unstructured sense of entitlement that defies the prohibition Kant placed on justifying means by ends. It is the culmination of ethically over-inflated but fundamentally cynical motivations and justifications constructed in the minds of those who are determined to achieve personal ends, whether instrumental or expressive, and have fetishistically disavowed the likelihood that their actions will cause harm to others and their environments. Special liberty operates at the boundary of the pseudo-pacification process's normative structure and threatens its stability.
- Loss, trauma and nostalgia. Winlow's work on the impact of the loss of identities during the process of rapid deindustrialization in the UK demonstrated how this existential trauma added another dimension to material, communal and social loss. As new identities were forged in consumer culture's symbolic order, many respondents were also moved by a deep nostalgia that combines cynicism with a sense of marginalisation and loss of hope. Some individuals immersed themselves in criminal markets to compensate for this loss, achieve status and forge a simulated autonomous identity. Others also drifted into far-right politics manifested in the UK riots of 2024.
- Objectless anxiety. Hall's concept denotes the psychocultural end result of the operation of mass-mediated ideology in support of an existing way of life. Anxiety naturally lacks an object. By constantly ignoring, denying or reframing the real systemic causes of problems and preventing the ensuing anxiety from locating and understanding the appropriate object of fear on which people can act, the natural condition is artificially, systematically and indefinitely sustained. The concept has been deployed by criminologists researching deviant leisure, drug culture and policing.
- The assumption of harmlessness. Raymen's concept was the product of a search into the historical background of special liberty in an attempt to explore the cultural context that underlies Western liberal societies' understanding of harm. An unwritten rule in liberal thought insists that, where there is initial doubt, an activity should be assumed to be sufficiently harmless to practice before anyone should suspect it might be harmful. Therefore the onus is always on those who wish to prove it is harmful. This concept is one of ultra-realism's theoretical contributions to zemiology.

=== Methods – ethnographic networks ===
Drawing upon earlier ethnographic work from Winlow, ultra-realists argue that criminological researchers are capable of capturing the details of the drivers behind crime and criminal markets by networking and generating qualitative data from different geographical locations and sections of the population. For example, projects undertaken to examine rioting in various locations of the UK and political protests around Europe revealed both differences and similarities in experiences, interpretations, motivations and outcomes. Networked ethnographers working in various spaces gathered data from observations and interviews to be analysed in the ultra-realist framework.

== Research projects ==
A number of researchers have used ultra-realist concepts as they construct their research projects and analyze their findings. Ultra-realists criticize 'backwards research' and insist on 'forwards research'. In the period 2015 to 2025 ultra-realism has provided a platform for research in the following areas:

=== Crime, deviant leisure and consumer culture ===
- Hall, Steve; Kuldova, Tereza; Horsley, Mark (2020). Crime, Harm and Consumerism. Routledge Studies in Crime and Society. Abingdon, Oxon: Routledge. ISBN 9781138388628.
- McRae, Leanne (2020). Terror, Leisure and Consumption: Spaces for Harm in a Post-Crash Era. Emerald studies in deviant leisure. Bingley: Emerald. ISBN 9781787565234.
- Lloyd, Anthony; Horsley, Mark (2022). "Consumer culture, precarious incomes and mass indebtedness: Borrowing from uncertain futures, consuming in precarious times". Thesis Eleven. 168 (1): 55–71. doi:10.1177/07255136211053421. ISSN 0725-5136.
- Hall, Steve; Winlow, Simon (2007). "Cultural criminology and primitive accumulation: A formal introduction for two strangers who should really become more intimate". Crime, Media, Culture. 3 (1): 82–90. doi:10.1177/1741659007074451. ISSN 1741-6590.
- Winlow, Simon; Hall, Steve (2018). "Criminology and Consumerism". In Carlen, Pat; França, Leandro Ayres (eds.). Alternative criminologies. Abingdon, Oxon: Routledge. ISBN 978-1-315-15866-2.
- Ellis, Anthony; Winlow, Simon; Briggs, Daniel; Esquinas, Antonio Silva; Verdugo, Rebeca Cordero; Suárez, Jorge Ramiro Pérez (2018). "Liberalism, Lack and 'Living the Dream': Reconsidering the attractions of alcohol-based leisure for young tourists in Magaluf, Majorca". Journal of Extreme Anthropology. 2 (2): 22–41. doi:10.5617/jea.6446. ISSN 2535-3241.
- Lynes, Adam; Kelly, Craig; Kelly, Emma (2020). "THUG LIFE: Drill music as a periscope into urban violence in the consumer age". The British Journal of Criminology. 60 (5): 1201–1219. doi:10.1093/bjc/azaa011. ISSN 0007-0955.
- Raymen, Thomas; Smith, Oliver (2020). "Lifestyle gambling, indebtedness and anxiety: A deviant leisure perspective". Journal of Consumer Culture. 20 (4): 381–399. doi:10.1177/1469540517736559. ISSN 1469-5405.
- Raymen, Thomas; Smith, Oliver, eds. (2019). Deviant Leisure: Criminological Perspectives on Leisure and Harm. Palgrave Studies in Crime, Media and Culture. Basingstoke: Palgrave Macmillan. ISBN 9783030177355.
- Raymen, Thomas (2019). Parkour, Deviance and Leisure in the Late-Capitalist City: An Ethnography. Emerald studies in deviant leisure. Bingley: Emerald. ISBN 9781787438125.
- Winlow, Simon (2019), "What Lies Beneath? Some Notes on Ultra-realism, and the Intellectual Foundations of the 'Deviant Leisure' Perspective", in Raymen, Thomas; Smith, Oliver (eds.), Deviant Leisure, Palgrave Studies in Crime, Media and Culture, Basingstoke: Palgrave Macmillan, pp. 45–65, doi:10.1007/978-3-030-17736-2_3, ISBN 9783030177355
- Raymen, Thomas; Smith, Oliver (2019). "Deviant Leisure: A Critical Criminological Perspective for the Twenty-First Century". Critical Criminology. 27 (1): 115–130. doi:10.1007/s10612-019-09435-x. ISSN 1205-8629.
- Raymen, Thomas (2019), "The Paradox of Parkour: Conformity, Resistance and Spatial Exclusion", in Raymen, Thomas; Smith, Oliver (eds.), Deviant Leisure, Palgrave Studies in Crime, Media and Culture, Basingstoke: Palgrave Macmillan, pp. 349–377, doi:10.1007/978-3-030-17736-2_16, ISBN 9783030177355
- Briggs, Daniel; Ellis, Anthony (2017). "The Last Night of Freedom: Consumerism, Deviance and the "Stag Party"". Deviant Behavior. 38 (7): 756–767. doi:10.1080/01639625.2016.1197678. ISSN 0163-9625.

=== Crime, harm and place ===
- Briggs, Daniel; Monge Gamero, Rubén (2017). Dead-End Lives: Drugs and Violence in the City Shadows. Bristol: Policy. ISBN 9781447341680.
- Telford, Luke; Wistow, Jonathan (2022). Levelling Up the UK Economy: The Need for Transformative Change. Basingstoke: Palgrave Macmillan. ISBN 9783031175060.
- Telford, Luke (2022). English Nationalism and its Ghost Towns. Abingdon, Oxon: Routledge. ISBN 9781032056715.
- Briggs, Daniel; Gavrielides, Theo (2022). Hotel Puta: A Hardcore Ethnography of a Luxury Brothel. Restorative Justice Series. London: RJ4All Publications. ISBN 9781911634645.
- Kuldova, Tereza; Varghese, Mathew A., eds. (2022). Urban Utopias: Excess and Expulsion in Neoliberal South Asia. Palgrave Studies in Urban Anthropology. Basingstoke: Palgrave Macmillan. ISBN 9783319476223.
- Lynes, Adam; Kelly, Craig; Treadwell, James, eds. (2023). 50 Dark Destinations: Crime and Contemporary Tourism. Bristol: Policy. ISBN 9781447362197.
- Telford, Luke; Lloyd, Anthony (2020). "From "Infant Hercules" to "Ghost Town": Industrial Collapse and Social Harm in Teesside". Critical Criminology. 28 (4): 595–611. doi:10.1007/s10612-020-09523-3. ISSN 1572-9877.

=== Crime, harm, work and employment ===
- Lloyd, Anthony (2019). The Harms of Work: An Ultra-Realist Account of the Service Economy. Studies in Social Harm. Bristol: Bristol University Press. ISBN 9781529204032.
- Raymen, Thomas; Smith, Oliver (2016). "What's Deviance Got to Do With It? Black Friday Sales, Violence and Hyper-conformity". British Journal of Criminology. 56 (2): 389–405. doi:10.1093/bjc/azv051. ISSN 0007-0955.
- Smith, Oliver; Raymen, Thomas (2017). "Shopping with violence: Black Friday sales in the British context". Journal of Consumer Culture. 17 (3): 677–694. doi:10.1177/1469540515611204. ISSN 1469-5405.
- Bushell, Mark; Braithwaite, Chelsea (2024). "Barbarians at the Tills? Post-pandemic reflections on violence and abuse against workers in the retail industry". Journal of Consumer Culture. 24 (4): 441–458. doi:10.1177/14695405241290934. ISSN 1469-5405.
- Bushell, Mark G. (2023). "No Time for Rest: An Exploration of Sleep and Social Harm in the North East Night-Time Economy (NTE)". Critical Criminology. 31 (1): 145–160. doi:10.1007/s10612-022-09655-8. ISSN 1572-9877. PMC 9419915. PMID 36061069.
- Lloyd, Anthony (2023). "Harm at Work: Bullying and Special Liberty in the Retail Sector". Critical Criminology. 28 (4): 669–683. doi:10.1007/s10612-019-09445-9. ISSN 1205-8629.
- Telford, Luke; Briggs, Daniel (2022). "Targets and overwork: Neoliberalism and the maximisation of profitability from the workplace". Capital & Class. 46 (1): 59–76. doi:10.1177/03098168211022208. ISSN 0309-8168.

=== Covid, lockdown and social harm ===
- Briggs, Daniel; Telford, Luke; Lloyd, Anthony; Ellis, Anthony; Kotzé, Justin (2021). Lockdown: Social Harm in the Covid-19 Era. Cham: Springer. ISBN 9783030888244.
- Briggs, Daniel; Telford, Luke; Lloyd, Anthony; Ellis, Anthony (2023). The New Futures of Exclusion: Life in the Covid-19 Aftermath (1st ed.). Cham: Springer. ISBN 9783031418655.
- Lloyd, Anthony; Briggs, Daniel; Ellis, Anthony; Telford, Luke (2024). "Critical Reflections on the COVID-19 Pandemic from the NHS Frontline". Sociological Research Online. 29 (1): 83–100. doi:10.1177/13607804231156293. ISSN 1360-7804. PMC 9950816.
- Lloyd, Anthony (2017). "Ideology at work: reconsidering ideology, the labour process and workplace resistance". International Journal of Sociology and Social Policy. 37 (5/6): 266–279. doi:10.1108/IJSSP-02-2016-0019. ISSN 0144-333X.
- Briggs, Daniel; Telford, Luke; Lloyd, Anthony; Ellis, Anthony (2021). "Working, living and dying in COVID times: perspectives from frontline adult social care workers in the UK". Safer Communities. 20 (3): 208–222. doi:10.1108/SC-04-2021-0013. ISSN 1757-8043.

=== Riots and far-right politics ===
- Winlow, Simon; Hall, Steve; Treadwell, James (2017). The Rise of the Right: English Nationalism and the Transformation of Working-Class Politics. Bristol: Policy. ISBN 9781447328483.
- Winlow, Simon; Hall, Steve; Treadwell, James (2019-03-01), "Why the Left Must Change", Progressive Justice in an Age of Repression, Abingdon, Oxon: Routledge, pp. 26–41, doi:10.4324/9781351242059-3, ISBN 9781351242059
- Kelly, Emma; Winlow, Simon (2022). "Traversing the Fantasy: Why Leftist Academics Must Abandon the Myth of Organic Resistance and Think Again About the Problems We Face". Critical Criminology. 30 (2): 237–244. doi:10.1007/s10612-021-09573-1. ISSN 1205-8629.
- Winlow, Simon (2025). The Politics of Nostalgia: Class, Rootlessness and Decline. Society Now. Bingley: Emerald. ISBN 9781837535514.

=== Research methods ===
- Treadwell, James (2019). Criminological Ethnography: An Introduction. London: Sage. ISBN 9781473975712.
- Winlow, Simon; Measham, Fiona (2016). "Doing the Right Thing: Some notes on the control of research in British criminology". In Cowburn, Malcolm; Gelsthorpe, Loraine; Wahidin, Azrini (eds.). Research Ethics in Criminology: Dilemmas, Issues and Solutions. Abingdon, Oxon: Routledge. doi:10.4324/9781315753553. ISBN 9781315753553.
- Hall, Steve (2018). "Criminological Ethnography". In Davies, Pamela; Francis, Peter (eds.). Doing Criminological Research (3rd ed.). London: Sage. ISBN 9781473902725.
- Winlow, Simon (2022). "Beyond Measure: On the Marketization of British Universities, and the Domestication of Academic Criminology". Critical Criminology. 30 (3): 479–494. doi:10.1007/s10612-022-09643-y. ISSN 1572-9877.
- Armstrong, Emma Katie (2020). "Political Ideology and Research: How Neoliberalism Can Explain the Paucity of Qualitative Criminological Research". Alternatives. 45 (1): 20–32. doi:10.1177/0304375419899832. ISSN 0304-3754.
- Rios, Gino; Silva, Antonio (2020). Nuevos Horizontes en la Investigacion Criminlogica Ultra-Realismo (in Spanish). Lima, Peru: Universidad de San Martín de Porres. ISBN 9786124460234.
- Silva, Antonio; Pérez, Jorge; Cordero, Raquel; Díaz, Julio (2025). Researching Social Media with Children. Abingdon, Oxon: Routledge. ISBN 9781032506173.

=== Violence and masculinity ===
- Winlow, Simon (2001). Badfellas: Crime, Tradition and New Masculinities. Oxford: Berg. ISBN 1859734146.
- Ellis, Anthony (2017). Men, Masculinities and Violence: An Ethnographic Study. Routledge studies in crime and society. Abingdon, Oxon: Routledge. ISBN 9781138040274.
- Ellis, Anthony; Winlow, Simon; Hall, Steve (2017). "'Throughout my life I've had people walk all over me': Trauma in the lives of violent men". The Sociological Review. 65 (4): 699–713. doi:10.1177/0038026117695486. ISSN 0038-0261.
- Kotzé, Justin; Antonopoulos, Georgios A. (2021). "Boosting bodily capital: Maintaining masculinity, aesthetic pleasure and instrumental utility through the consumption of steroids". Journal of Consumer Culture. 21 (3): 683–700. doi:10.1177/1469540519846196. ISSN 1469-5405.
- Gibbs, Nick (2021). The Muscle Trade: The Use and Supply of Image and Performance Enhancing Drugs. Bristol: Bristol University Press. ISBN 9781529227949.

=== Crime, harm and glocal markets ===
- Hall, Alexandra; Antonopoulos, Giorgios (2016). Fake Meds Online: The Internet and the Transnational Market in Illicit Pharmaceuticals. Basingstoke: Palgrave Macmillan. ISBN 9781137570888.
- Kotzé, Justin; Antonopoulos, Giorgios A (2023). "Con Air: exploring the trade in counterfeit and unapproved aircraft parts". The British Journal of Criminology. 63 (5): 1293–1308. doi:10.1093/bjc/azac089. ISSN 0007-0955.
- Bural, Dilara; Lloyd, Anthony; Antonopoulos, Georgios A.; Kotzé, Justin (2023). ""Fake it to make it": exploring product counterfeiting in Türkiye". Journal of Financial Crime. 31 (6): 1451–1466. doi:10.1108/JFC-10-2023-0252. ISSN 1758-7239.

=== Policing and corruption ===
- Brookshaw, Brendan (2024). Addressing Corruption in the Police Service: The Thick Blue Line. Palgrave critical policing studies. Basingstoke: Palgrave Macmillan. ISBN 9783031750670.
- Kuldova, Tereza; Gundhus, Helene Oppen Ingebrigtsen; Wathne, Christin Thea, eds. (2024). Policing and Intelligence in the Global Big Data Era, Volume I: New Global Perspectives on Algorithmic Governance. Palgrave Critical Policing Studies. Basingstoke: Palgrave Macmillan. ISBN 9783031683251.
- Kuldova, Tereza; Gundhus, Helene Oppen Ingebrigtsen; Wathne, Christin Thea, eds. (2024). Policing and Intelligence in the Global Big Data Era, Volume II: New Global Perspectives on the Politics and Ethics of Knowledge. Palgrave Critical Policing Studies. Basingstoke: Palgrave Macmillan. ISBN 9783031682971.

=== Homicide and serial murder ===
- Yardley, Elizabeth; Wilson, David (2015). Female Serial Killers in Social Context: Criminological Institutionalism and the Case of Mary Ann Cotton. Shorts Research. Bristol: Policy. ISBN 9781447326458.
- Hall, Steve; Wilson, David (2014). "New foundations: Pseudo-pacification and special liberty as potential cornerstones for a multi-level theory of homicide and serial murder". European Journal of Criminology. 11 (5): 635–655. doi:10.1177/1477370814536831. ISSN 1477-3708.
- Lynes, Adam; Kelly, Craig; Uppal, Pravanjot Kapil Singh (2018). "Benjamin's 'flâneur' and serial murder: An ultra-realist literary case study of Levi Bellfield". Crime, Media, Culture. 15 (3): 523–543. doi:10.1177/1741659018815934. ISSN 1741-6590

=== Crime, harm and mass media ===
- Hayward, Keith J; Hall, Steve (2021). "Through Scandinavia, Darkly: A Criminological Critique of Nordic Noir". The British Journal of Criminology. 61 (1): 1–21. doi:10.1093/bjc/azaa044. ISSN 0007-0955.
- Wilson, David (2011). Looking for Laura: Public Criminology and Hot News. Hook: Waterside Press. ISBN 9781904380702. OCLC 727021849.
- Yardley, Elizabeth; Kelly, Emma; Robinson-Edwards, Shona (2019). "Forever trapped in the imaginary of late capitalism? The serialized true crime podcast as a wake-up call in times of criminological slumber". Crime, Media, Culture. 15 (3): 503–521. doi:10.1177/1741659018799375. ISSN 1741-6590

=== Crime, corruption and compliance ===
- Kuldova, Tereza; Østbø, Jardar; Raymen, Thomas (2024). Luxury and Corruption: Challenging the Anti-Corruption Consensus. Bristol: Bristol University Press. ISBN 9781529236330.
- Kuldova, Tereza; Østbø, Jardar; Shore, Cris, eds. (2024). Compliance, Defiance, and 'Dirty' Luxury: New Perspectives on Anti-Corruption in Elite Contexts. Basingstoke: Palgrave Macmillan. ISBN 9783031571398.
- Lynes, Adam; Treadwell, James; Bavin, Kyla (2024). Crimes of the Powerful and the Contemporary Condition: The Democratic Republic of Capitalism. Bristol: Bristol University Press. ISBN 978-1-5292-2829-8.

=== Technology, harm and crime ===
- Yardley, Elizabeth (2020). "Technology-Facilitated Domestic Abuse in Political Economy: A New Theoretical Framework". Violence Against Women. 27 (10): 1479–1498. doi:10.1177/1077801220947172. ISSN 1077-8012. PMID 32757887.The crime decline
- Kotzé, Justin (2019). The Myth of the Crime Decline: Exploring Change and Continuity in Crime and Harm. Routledge Studies in Crime and Society. Abingdon, Oxon: Routledge. ISBN 9780815353935.Child abuse
- Ellis, Anthony; Briggs, Daniel; Lloyd, Anthony (2021). "A ticking time bomb of future harm: Lockdown, child abuse and future violence". Abuse: An International Impact Journal. 2 (1): 37–48. doi:10.37576/abuse.2021.017. hdl:11268/11957

=== History and violence ===
- Ellis, Anthony (2019). "A De-Civilizing Reversal or System Normal? Rising Lethal Violence in Post-Recession Austerity United Kingdom". The British Journal of Criminology. 59 (4): 862–878. doi:10.1093/bjc/azz001. ISSN 0007-0955.
- Horsley, Mark; Kotze, Justin; Hall, Stephen (2015). "The Maintenance of Orderly Disorder: Law, markets and the pseudo-pacification process". Journal on European History of Law. 6 (1). ISSN 2042-6402.

=== Crime, corruption and sport ===
- Jump, Deborah (2020). The Criminology of Boxing, Violence and Desistance. Bristol: Bristol University Press. ISBN 9781529203295.
- Gallacher, Grace (2022), Silva, Derek; Kennedy, Liam (eds.), "The (De)Civilizing Process: An Ultra-Realist Examination of Sport", Power Played: A critical criminology of sport, Vancouver: University of British Columbia Press, pp. 100–116, doi:10.59962/9780774867818-004, ISBN 9780774867818

=== Harm and hate crime ===
- James, Zoë (2020). The Harms of Hate for Gypsies and Travellers: A Critical Hate Studies Perspective. Palgrave Hate Studies. Basingstoke: Palgrave Macmillan. ISBN 9781137518286.
- James, Zoë (2020). "Gypsies' and Travellers' lived experience of harm: A critical hate studies perspective". Theoretical Criminology. 24 (3): 502–520. doi:10.1177/1362480620911914. ISSN 1362-4806.

=== Other Projects ===
- Military Studies: Armstrong, Emma (2025). British Army Veterans' Experiences of the Transition into Civilian Life: An Ultra-Realist Perspective. Abingdon, Oxon: Routledge. ISBN 9781032797113.
- Subjectivity and Investment Fraud: Tudor, Kate (2018). "Toxic Sovereignty:Understanding Fraud as the Expression of Special Liberty within Late Capitalism". Journal of Extreme Anthropology. 2 (2): 7–21. doi:10.5617/jea.6476. ISSN 2535-3241.
- Crime, Harm and Drugs: Ayres, Tammy; Ancrum, Craig (2023). Understanding Drug Dealing and Illicit Drug Markets: National and International Perspectives. Abingdon, Oxon: Routledge. ISBN 9781138541825.
- Criminology and Borders: Briggs, Daniel (2021). Climate Changed: Refugee Border Stories and the Business of Misery. Abingdon, Oxon: Routledge. ISBN 9781003004929.

== Critique and responses ==
Early criticism from reviewers focused on ultra-realism's complexity, opacity and lack of diversity. Ultra-realists responded by arguing that students and early career researchers experience little trouble in dealing with the complexity, that the ethnographic networking method enables and highlights diversity, and that ultra-realism's theoretical concepts can be adopted by any researcher in any part of the world.

Debates followed around the relative conceptual value of the civilizing process and the pseudo-pacification process. Ultra-realists regard the latter as more representative of reality while defenders of Elias's concept argue that the nuances of his thesis have been ignored or misunderstood. Ultra-realists responded by pointing out that the roots of the pseudo-pacification process were in 12th-century England. It is an alternative theory rooted in a time that predates the roots of the civilizing process in 17th century Europe.

Further criticisms focused on ultra-realism's naturalization of violent drives, the incoherence of the connection between the pseudo-pacification process and special liberty, a tendency towards monocausality, essentialism and reductionism associated with the 'direct causality' of the economic context, the denial of human agency, and neglect of gender relations as epiphenomenal. Ultra-realists responded by pointing out that special liberty motivates and permits individuals to move beyond the legal and normative boundaries of pseudo-pacification, therefore they are integrated parts of the same process. The ultra realist concept of the 'chosen unconscious' suggests that the thesis is grounded in agency and choice. The economic context is probabilistic, not directly causal, because ultra-realists use crime trends as initial indicators of the need for further investigation using ethnographic methods to investigate the complex relations between economy, culture, and individual situations. Gender relations have featured centrally in ultra-realist research.

More recent debates have discussed the possibility that ultra-realism doesn't offer anything new, its causal logic is tautological and can't be falsified, and the transcendental materialist framework is unverifiable. Ultra-realists responded by arguing that concepts such as the pseudo-pacification process and special liberty are unique to ultra-realism. Whereas ultra-realists agreed that they require more research to address the issue of falsification, Hall and Winlow also agreed with Lakatos's claim that Popper's notion is flawed because the falsifying premises themselves are often preferences that have evaded falsification. The criticism that the transcendental materialist framework is currently unverified has been accepted. Hall and Winlow addressed this issue by integrating recent neuroscientific and neuropsychoanalytic work into their theoretical framework. This produced the concept of 'the molecular question', the combined biological, affective and metaphysical process that seems to underlie what Lacan proposed as a 'void'.
