= Habitus (sociology) =

How individuals perceive and react to the social world

In sociology, habitus (/ˈhæbɪtəs/) is the way that people perceive and respond to the social world they inhabit, by way of their personal habits, skills, and disposition of character.

People with a common cultural background (social class, religion, and nationality, ethnic group, education, and profession) share a habitus as the way that group culture and personal history shape the mind of a person; consequently, a person's habitus influences and shapes their social actions.

The sociologist Pierre Bourdieu said that the habitus consists of the hexis, a person's carriage (posture) and speech (accent), and the mental habits of perception, classification, appreciation, feeling, and action. The habitus allows the individual person to consider and resolve problems based upon gut feeling and intuition. This way of living (social attitudes, mannerisms, tastes, morality, etc.) influences the availability of opportunities in life; thus the habitus is structured by the person's social class, but also gives structure to the future paths available to the person. Therefore, the reproduction of social structures results from the habitus of the individual persons who compose the given social structure.

The habitus is criticised as being a deterministic concept, because, as social actors, people behave as automata, in the sense proposed in the Monadology of the philosopher G.W. Leibniz.

== Origins ==
The sociologist Loïc Wacquant traces habitus first to the Nicomachean Ethics of Aristotle, whose notion of hexis was later translated into habitus by Thomas Acquinas in Summa Theologiae. Wacquant notes that habitus was used by sociologists such as Emile Durkheim, Marcel Mauss, and Max Weber, and later in the works of Edmund Hursserl and Maurice Merleau-Ponty. For example, Mauss used habitus in his 1934 essay 'Techniques of the Body' (les techniques du corps). He used the term to talk about those aspects of culture that are anchored in bodily practices such as walking or swimming. Norbert Elias used the concept in The Civilizing Process (1939) to discuss the habitus of 'civilized' people.

It is in the work of Pierre Bourdieu, however, that a reintroduction of the concept is seen as a cornerstone of his sociology to address the sociological problem of agency and structure. He first used the term in his 1967 postface to Erwin Panofsky's Gothic Architecture and Scholasticism.

In Bourdieu's work, the habitus is shaped by structural position and generates action. Thus, when people exercise agency, they simultaneously reflect and reproduce social structure. Bourdieu elaborated his theory of the habitus while drawing on cognitive and generative schemes from Noam Chomsky and Jean Piaget regarding dependency on history and human memory. For instance, a certain behaviour or belief becomes part of a society's structure when the original purpose of that behaviour or belief can no longer be recalled and becomes socialized into individuals of that culture.

According to Bourdieu, habitus consists of:

systems of durable, transposable dispositions, structured structures predisposed to function as structuring structures, that is, as principles which generate and organize practices and representations that can be objectively adapted to their outcomes without presupposing a conscious aiming at ends or an express mastery of the operations necessary in order to attain them.

For Bourdieu, habitus includes the totality of learned habits, bodily skills, styles, tastes, and other non-discursive knowledges that might be said to "go without saying" for a specific group. In that way, it can be said to operate beneath the level of rational ideology.

The philosopher Giorgio Agamben writes that the term habitus itself "originally signified 'a way of being or acting'" in the Christian monastic tradition. Agamben claims that the term had been in use already among the Stoics as a description of personal attributes synonymous with virtue.

== Non-sociological uses ==
=== Literary criticism ===
The term has also been adopted in literary criticism, adapting from Bourdieu's usage. For example, Joe Moran's examination of authorial identities in Star Authors: Literary Celebrity in America uses the term to discuss how authors develop a habitus formed around their own celebrity and status as authors, which manifests in their writing.

=== Use in literary theory ===
Bourdieu's concept of habitus is interwoven with the concept of structuralism in literary theory. Peter Barry explains, "in the structuralist approach to literature there is a constant movement away from interpretation of the individual literary work and a parallel drive towards understanding the larger structures which contain them". There is therefore a strong desire to understand the larger influencing factors which makes an individual literary work. As Bourdieu explains:

Habitus are generative principles of distinct and distinctive practices – what the worker eats, and especially the way he eats it, the sport he practices and the way he practices it, his political opinions and the way he expresses them are systematically different from the industrial owner's corresponding activities. But habitus are also classificatory schemes, principles of classification, principles of vision and division, different tastes. They make distinctions between what is good and what is bad, between what is right and what is wrong, between what is distinguished and what is vulgar, and so forth, but the distinctions are not identical. Thus, for instance, the same behaviour or even the same good can appear distinguished to one person, pretentious to someone else, and cheap or showy to yet another.

— Pierre Bourdieu, Practical Reason: On the Theory of Action, 1998, p. 8

As a result, habitus may be employed in literary theory in order to understand larger, external structures which influence individual theories and works of literature.

=== Body habitus ===
Body habitus (or "bodily habitus") is the medical term for physique, and is categorized as either endomorphic (relatively short and stout), ectomorphic (relatively long and thin) or mesomorphic (muscular proportions). In this sense, habitus has in the past been interpreted as the physical and constitutional characteristics of an individual, especially as related to the tendency to develop a certain disease. For example, "Marfanoid bodily habitus".

== Scholars researching habitus ==
- Loïc Wacquant – a sociologist and ethnographer who studied the construction of the "pugilistic habitus" in a boxing gym of the black ghetto of Chicago in Body & Soul: Notebooks of an Apprentice Boxer (2004) and in "Habitus as Topic and Tool" (2009).
- Bernard Lahire – a French sociologist who suggested that the habitus is not (or no longer) a system shared by a class, but rather an eclectic set of dispositions that are often contradictory, due to non-typical socialization paths in late modernity.
- Gabriel Ignatow explored how the notion of habitus can contribute to the sociology of morality.
- Philippe Bourgois – an anthropologist who incorporates the concept of "habitus" into his work with intravenous drug users in the San Francisco Bay Area.
- Saba Mahmood – an anthropologist who suggested that the habitus can be shaped and transformed not only through unconscious mimesis but also through a pedagogical process, while reverting from Bourdieu's account to that of Aristotle.
- Stephen Parkin – a sociologist who considers the "habitus" construct as an explanatory mechanism for the production of drug related harm in drug using environments located in public settings in Habitus and Drug Using Environments: Health Place and Lived-Experience.
- Heinrich Wilhelm Schäfer – Center for the Interdisciplinary Research on Religion and Society (CIRRuS) at Bielefeld University (Germany).
- Ori Schwarz – a sociologist who studied the "sonic habitus", schemes that organize the production of sounds, their classification (e.g. as "noise") and the reaction to them.
- Loren Ludwig, US – a musicologist researching the way that instrumental chamber music allows for the cultivation and experience of habitus by its players.
- Norbert Elias – a German sociologist studying how the habitus is determined on our culturally accepted manners. In The Civilizing Process, his theory is also extended to a 'national habitus' of Germans, used to justify the Holocaust.
- Dov Cohen and Hans IJzerman – psychologists who studied the habitus in social psychology, examining how Latinos and Anglos embody honor differently.
- Sudhir Chella Rajan, who shows how automobility forms a complex discursive apparatus built on fragile assumptions around individuality, autonomy, and driving and is so ideologically powerful as to constitute the very bodily disposition of liberal political theory.
- Victor J. Friedman and Israel J. Sykes likens the idea of habitus to the idea of theory-in-action developed by Chris Argyris and Donald Schön.
- William Cockerham – American medical sociologist, uses Bourdieu's habitus as a basis for his health lifestyle theory.
