= Stephen Mennell =

British professor (born 1944)

Stephen John Mennell (born 1944 in Yorkshire, England) is professor emeritus of Sociology at University College Dublin.

Mennell was educated at Huddersfield New College in West Yorkshire, and gained his BA in economics in 1966 from St Catharine's College, Cambridge (MA 1970) and his Doctorate at the University of Amsterdam. He was a Frank Knox Memorial Fellow (1966–67) at Harvard University. After returning from America, he taught at the University of Exeter, England, from 1967 to 1990, when he became Professor of Sociology in the Department of Anthropology and Sociology at Monash University in Australia, before returning to Europe as Professor at University College Dublin in 1993. At UCD, along with his wife Barbara, he founded UCD Press on behalf of the university, and he also served as first Director (1999–2002) of what is now the Geary Institute, a new social scientific research institute established with Irish government support.

Stephen Mennell's major intellectual influence is Norbert Elias, and from 1997 to 2016 he was a member of the Board of the Norbert Elias Foundation, Amsterdam - in effect one of Elias's executors. He was General Editor of the Collected Works of Norbert Elias in English, which were published in 18 volumes (2006-2014) by UCD Press.

Elias's influence is especially evident in Mennell's landmark book All Manners of Food: Eating and Taste in England and France from the Middle Ages to the Present (1985), and in The American Civilizing Process (2007). His other books include Sociological Theory: Uses and Unities (1974; rev. edn 1980), Alexis de Tocqueville on Democracy, Revolution and Society (edited with John Stone, 1980), and two selections of Elias's writings edited with Johan Goudsblom.

Stephen Mennell was awarded the degree of Doctor of Letters by the University of Cambridge in 2004, and elected a Foreign Member of the Royal Netherlands Academy of Arts and Sciences in the same year. In 2009 he was elected a Member of the Royal Irish Academy.

...Мany sociologists – ‘theorists’ especially – see no value in ideas that are clearly expressed rather than dressed up in obscurantism and neologisms.
