= La Hire (disambiguation) =

La Hire or Lahire may refer to:

People

- La Hire, Étienne de Vignolles dit La Hire (1390—1443)
- Bernard Lahire (born 1963), French sociologist and author
- Jean de La Hire (1878—1956) pseudonym of Adolphe d'Espie de La Hire, French author
- Phillipe de la Hire (1640—1718) French astronomer and mathematician

Other

- Mons La Hire, a lunar feature named for Philippe de la Hire
- Lahire, in French the name for the Jack of hearts, named for Étienne de Vignolles
