= Eric Dunning =

British sociologist (1936–2019)

- Born: 27 December 1936; London
- Died: 10 February 2019 (aged 82); Leicester
- Awards: DLitt honoris causa 2013

Academic background
- Education: University of Leicester

Academic work
- Institutions: University of Leicester
- Main interests: Sociology
- Website: Profile page

Eric Dunning (27 December 1936 – 10 February 2019) was a British sociologist who was Emeritus Professor of sociology at the University of Leicester.

== Career ==
Eric Dunning was a pioneer in the sociology of sport and the founder, with Patrick Murphy and John Williams, of the Sir Norman Chester Centre for Football Research. He was the author of a number of books and articles on sport and the figurational sociology of Norbert Elias. Although officially retired, Dunning remained an emeritus Professor of the University of Leicester as well as a visiting professor at the Chester Centre for Research into Sport and Society. Dunning was also a member of the editorial board of the Jornal de Ciências do Exercicio e Esporte, Paraná Federal University, Brazil.

Dunning had edited and co-authored numerous books in the sociology of sport. In 1999 he published his first sole-authored book, Sport Matters. In October 2000, he co-edited the comprehensive Handbook of Sports Studies with Jay Coakley. His book about Norbert Elias, Norbert Elias and Modern Sociology is based partly on Dunning's personal experience working with Elias for more than three decades. The book, co-authored with Jason Hughes, was published in 2012.

Dunning's supervised PhD students were Joseph Maguire, Dominic Malcolm, Martin Roderick, Yair Galily, Chris Pitts & Andy Smith.

== Research interests ==
- sociological theory, especially the functional sociology and theory of civilizing processes of Norbert Elias and its place within the wider field of classical and modern sociology
- the sociology of sport and leisure
- problems of violence and civilization, especially sports-related violence such as football hooliganism
- the use of Elias's theory in understanding the Holocaust and genocide more generally.

== Representative Publications ==
- Dunning, Eric; Murphy, Patrick; Williams, John (1988). The roots of football hooliganism: an historical and sociological study. London New York: Routledge & Kegan Paul. ISBN 9780415036771.
- Dunning, Eric (1999). Sport matters: sociological studies of sport, violence, and civilization. London New York: Routledge. ISBN 9780415093781.
- Dunning, Eric; Coakley, Jay (2000). Handbook of sports studies. London: SAGE. ISBN 9780761949497.
- Dunning, Eric; Murphy, Patrick; Waddington, Ivan; Astrinakis, Antonios (2002). Fighting fans: football hooliganism as a world phenomenon. Dublin: University College Dublin Press. ISBN 9781900621748.
- Dunning, Eric; Mennell, Stephen J. (2003). Norbert Elias. Masters in Modern Social Thought. London Thousand Oaks, California: SAGE. ISBN 9780761974574.
- Dunning, Eric; Dominic, Malcolm (2003). Sport: critical concepts in sociology. London New York: Routledge. ISBN 9780415262927.
- Dunning, Eric; Hughes, Jason (2012). Norbert Elias and modern sociology knowledge, interdependence, power, process. London: Bloomsbury Academic. ISBN 9781780932255.
