= Jason Hughes (sociologist) =

British sociologist

- Born: United Kingdom

Academic background
- Education: University of Leicester

Academic work
- Institutions: University of Leicester
- Main interests: Sociology
- Website: www2.le.ac.uk/departments/sociology/people/prof-jason-hughes

Jason Hughes is a British professor of sociology at University of Leicester, elected Fellow of the Academy of Social Science, appointed Member of the Academy of Europe, and a senior fellow of the Higher Education Academy. Previously, he was a senior lecturer at Brunel University of London.

He is co-editor of Sociological Research Online member of the editorial board of Historical Social Research, and has been guest editor for journals such as International Journal of Social Research Methodology; Crime, Media and Culture; Qualitative Research; The Journal of Workplace Learning and Historical Social Research. He is one of three members of the board of the Norbert Elias Foundation, Amsterdam, which oversees Elias's estate and promotes his work.

Hughes' research interests include problematised consumption; drugs, addiction and health; emotions, work and identity; figurational sociology and sociological theory; methods and methodology; moral panics; regulation, and more recently, e-cigarettes and vaping, temporality and futures.

His first book was Learning to Smoke. He completed, together with Eric Dunning, a study of the work of Norbert Elias entitled Norbert Elias and Modern Sociology: Knowledge, Interdependence, Power, Process. And together with Ruth Simpson and Natasha Slutskaya he wrote Gender, Class and Occupation. He has also published a number of edited books, including Visual Methods and Internet Research and co-edited books, including, together with Kahryn Hughes, John Goodwin and Jerry Coulton Contemporary Approaches to Ethnographic Research; together with John Goodwin, Documentary and Archival Research together with Chas Critcher, Julian Petley and Amanda Rohloff, Moral Panics in the Contemporary World; and, together with Nick Jewson and Lorna Unwin, Communities of Practice: Critical Perspectives.

Hughes has published articles, chapters and papers relating to his research interests. His work has been the recipient of a number of prizes including the Norbert Elias Prize (2006), the Emerald Literati Prize (2013), and the Sage Innovation Prize (2017).
