= Norbert Elias =

German British sociologist (1897–1990)

- Elias in 1933
- Born: 22 June 1897; Breslau, Silesia Province, Prussia, German Empire (now Wrocław, Poland)
- Died: 1 August 1990 (aged 93); Amsterdam, Netherlands
- Education: Breslau University; Heidelberg University
- Known for: Figurational sociology, theory of civilizing/decivilizing processes, habitus
- Scientific career
- Fields: Sociology
- Doctoral advisor: Richard Hönigswald

Norbert Elias (German: [ˈnɔʁbɛʁt eˈliːas]; 22 June 1897 – 1 August 1990) was a German sociologist who later became a British citizen. He is especially famous for his theory of civilizing/decivilizing processes.

== Early life and education ==
Elias was born on 22 June 1897 in Breslau (today: Wrocław) in Prussia's Silesia Province to Hermann Elias (1860–1940) and Sophie Elias, née Gallewski (also Galewski, 1875–1942). His father was a native of Kempen (today: Kępno) and a businessman in the textile industry. His mother was a native of the Jewish community of Breslau itself.

After passing the abitur in 1915, Norbert Elias volunteered for the German army in World War I and was employed as a telegrapher, first at the Eastern front, then at the Western front. After suffering a nervous breakdown in 1917, he was declared unfit for service and was posted to Breslau as a medical orderly.

The same year, Elias began studying philosophy, psychology and medicine at the University of Breslau, in addition spending a term each at the universities of Heidelberg (where he attended lectures by Karl Jaspers) and Freiburg in 1919 and 1920. He quit medicine in 1919 after passing the preliminary examination (Physikum). To finance his studies after his father's fortune had been reduced by hyperinflation, in 1922 Elias took up a job as the head of the export department in a local hardware factory. In 1924, he graduated with a doctoral dissertation in philosophy entitled Idee und Individuum (Idea and Individual) supervised by Richard Hönigswald, a representative of neo-Kantianism. Disappointed about the absence of the social aspect from neo-Kantianism, which had led to a serious dispute with his supervisor about his dissertation, Elias decided to turn to sociology for his further studies.

During his Breslau years, until 1925, Elias was deeply involved in the German Zionist movement, and acted as one of the leading intellectuals within the German-Jewish youth movement "Blau-Weiss" (Blue-White). During these years he got acquainted with other young Zionists like Erich Fromm, Leo Strauss, Leo Löwenthal and Gershom Scholem. In 1925, Elias moved to Heidelberg, where Alfred Weber accepted him as a candidate for a habilitation (second book project) on the development of modern science, entitled Die Bedeutung der Florentiner Gesellschaft und Kultur für die Entstehung der Wissenschaft (The Significance of Florentine Society and Culture for the Development of Science). In 1930 Elias chose to cancel this project and followed Karl Mannheim to become his assistant at the University of Frankfurt. However, after the Nazi take-over in early 1933, Mannheim's sociological institute was forced to close. The already submitted habilitation thesis entitled Der höfische Mensch ("The Man of the Court") was never formally accepted and not published until 1969 in a much elaborated form as "Die höfische Gesellschaft" ("The Court Society").

== Career ==
In 1933, Elias fled to Paris. His elderly parents remained in Breslau, where his father died in 1940; on 30 August 1942 his mother was deported to Theresienstadt, and on 29 September transferred to and murdered in Treblinka. During his two years in Paris, Elias worked as a private scholar supported by a scholarship from the Amsterdam Steunfonds (Prof. Frijda's benefit fund) and tried to gain some additional income by organizing a workshop for the production of wooden children's toys. In 1935, he moved on to Great Britain, where he worked on his magnum opus, The Civilizing Process, until 1939, now supported by a scholarship from a relief organization for Jewish refugees. In this work, he described the Nazi's genocide of the Jews as a "decivilizing spurt" of a civilization suffering from decay and a regression to barbarism. This work also contain's Elias' body theory. Drawing from historical documents describing manners and etiquette, he identified the processes that facilitated the emergence of the modern self within a civilized body. Elias equated the term "civilized" with the "controlled" body.

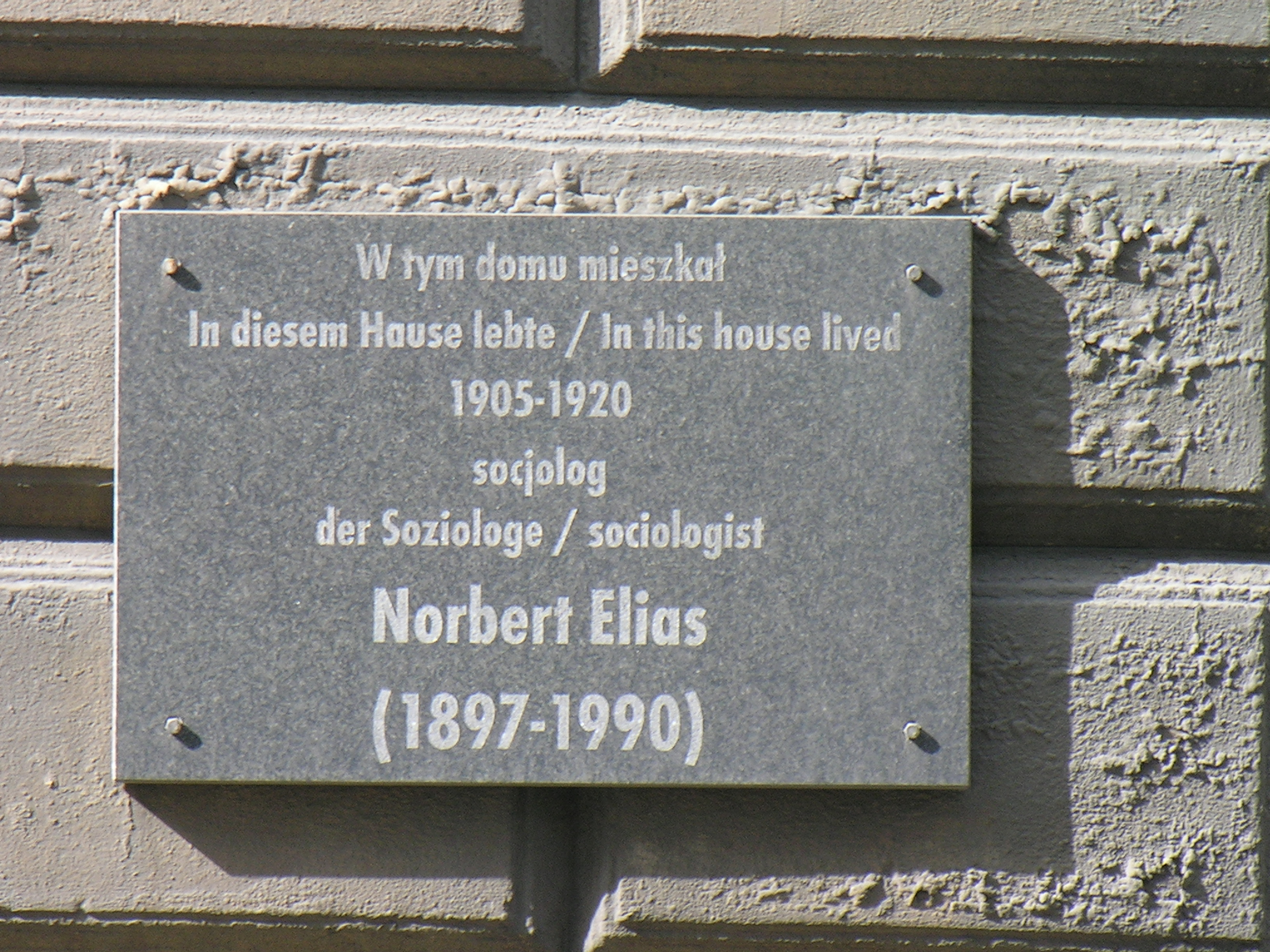
The plaque for Norbert Elias in Wrocław

In 1939, he met up with his former friend and supervisor Mannheim at the London School of Economics, where he obtained a position as senior research assistant. In 1940, the LSE was evacuated to Cambridge, but when an invasion of Britain by German forces appeared imminent, Elias was detained at internment camps in Liverpool and on the Isle of Man for eight months, on account of his being German – an "enemy alien". During his internment he organized political lectures and staged a drama he had written himself, Die Ballade vom armen Jakob (The Ballad of Poor Jacob) with a musical score by Hans Gál (eventually published in 1987).

Upon his release in 1941, he returned to Cambridge. Towards the end of the war, he worked for British intelligence, investigating hardened Nazis among German prisoners of war (see his essay "The breakdown of civilisation", in Studies on the Germans). He taught evening classes for the Workers' Educational Association (the adult education organization), and later evening extension courses in sociology, psychology, economics and economic history at the University of Leicester. He also held occasional lectureships at other institutions of higher learning. In collaboration with a friend from Frankfurt days, the psychoanalyst S. H. Foulkes, he laid the theoretical foundations of Group Analysis, an important school of therapy, and co-founded the Group Analytic Society in 1952. He himself trained and worked as a group therapist. On Febr. 22, 1952 he was naturalized as a British citizen.

In 1954 – at the very late age of 57 – he at last gained his first secure academic post, at University College, Leicester (which soon became the University of Leicester), first as lecturer and later as reader in sociology. Along with his friend Ilya Neustadt, he made a major contribution to the development of the university's department of sociology, which became one of the largest and most influential departments in the United Kingdom. He retired in 1962, but continued to teach graduate students in Leicester until the mid-1970s. Among subsequently famous sociologists whom Neustadt and Elias appointed as colleagues at Leicester, were John H. Goldthorpe, Anthony Giddens, Martin Albrow, Sheila Allen, Joe and Olive Banks, Richard Brown, Mary McIntosh, Nicos Mouzelis and Sami Zubaida and Keith Hopkins. (Hopkins was subsequently Professor of Ancient History at Cambridge: his appointment to teach sociology in Leicester is one sign of the very broad conception Elias and Neustadt had of the discipline of sociology.) Students in the department included John Eldridge, Chris Bryant, Chris Rojek, Paul Hirst, Graeme Salaman and Bryan R. Wilson. From 1962 to 1964, Elias taught as professor of sociology at the University of Ghana in Legon near Accra. After his return to Europe in 1965, he spent much time as visiting professor in various German and Dutch universities, and from 1978 based himself in Amsterdam.

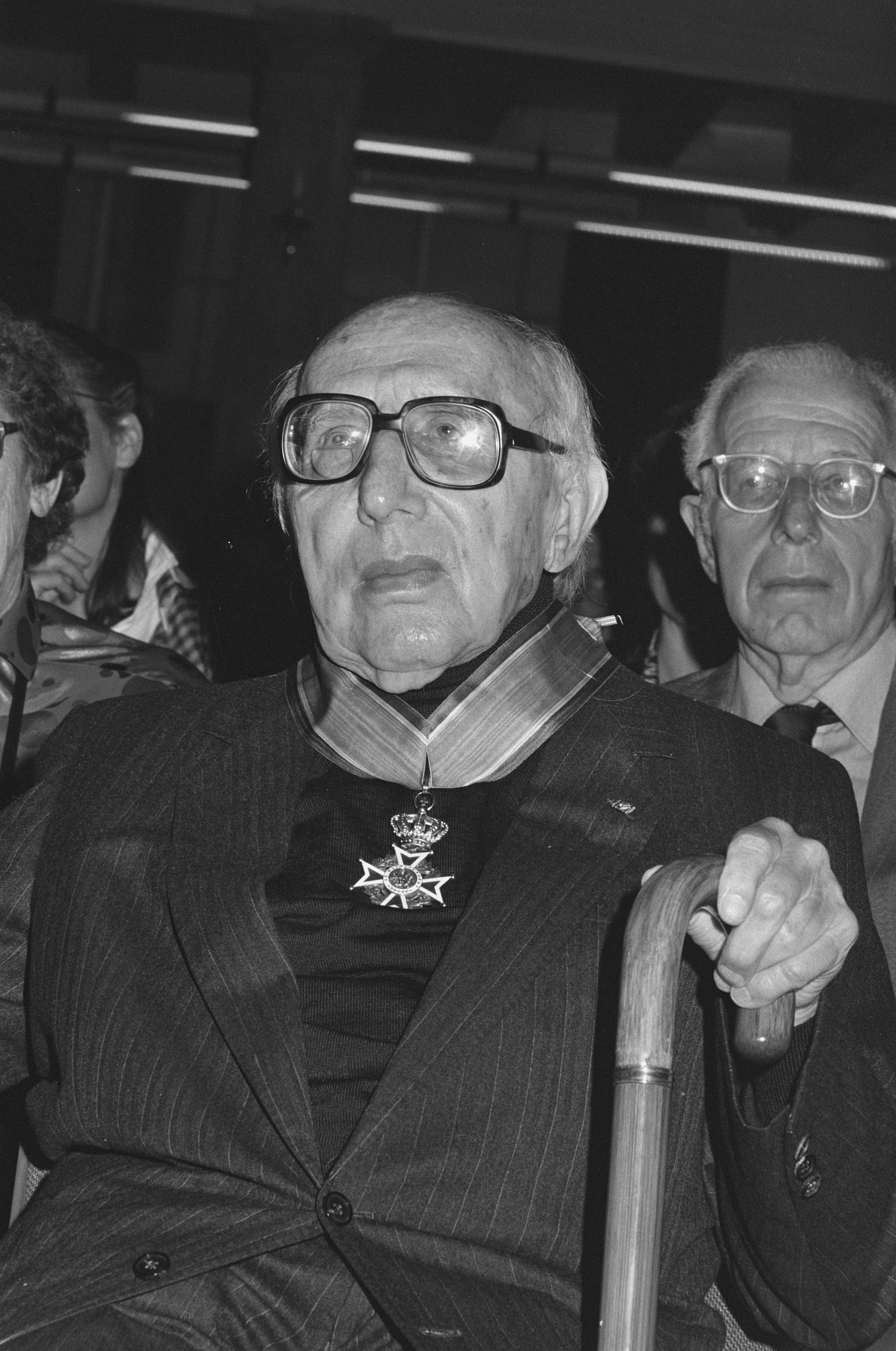
Elias appointed Commander in the Order of Orange-Nassau (1987)

His reputation and popularity grew immensely after the republication of The Civilizing Process in 1969. From 1978 to 1984 he worked at the Center for Interdisciplinary Research at Bielefeld University from which he received an honorary doctorate in 1980. Elias was the first ever laureate of both the Theodor W. Adorno Prize (1977) and the European Amalfi Prize for Sociology and Social Sciences (1987). In 1986 the Große Verdienstkreuz of the German Federal Republic was awarded to him, and on his 90th birthday he was appointed Commander in the Order of Orange-Nassau by the Dutch queen. By 1998 an International Sociological Association worldwide survey of sociologists ranked "On the Process of Civilization" (revised later title) seventh among the most important books in sociology in the twentieth century. In 1990 he collected the Nonino prize for a Maestro del nostro tempo in Italy. Outside his sociological work he always also wrote poetry.

== Death and legacy ==
Elias died at his home in Amsterdam on 1 August 1990. In September 2017, a bridge in the Vondelpark, not too far from where he lived, was named after him. In Almere, a street in the 'sustainable' sociologists' quarter also bears his name.

== Work ==
Elias' theory focused on the relationship between power, behavior, emotion, and knowledge over time. He significantly shaped what is called process or figurational sociology. Due to historical circumstances, Elias had long remained a marginal author, until being rediscovered by a new generation of scholars in the 1970s, when he eventually became one of the most influential sociologists in the history of the field. Interest in his work can be partly attributed to the fact that his concept of large social figurations or networks of interdependencies between people explains the emergence and function of large societal structures without neglecting the aspect of individual agency. In the 1960s and 1970s, the overemphasis of structure over agency was heavily criticized about the then-dominant school of structural functionalism.

Elias' most famous work is Über den Prozess der Zivilisation, published in English as The Civilizing Process (or, more accurately in the Collected Works edition – see below – as On the Process of Civilisation). Originally published in German, in two volumes, in 1939, it was virtually ignored until its republication in 1969, when its first volume was also translated into English. The first volume traces the historical developments of the European habitus, or "second nature," the particular individual psychic structures molded by social attitudes. Elias traced how post-medieval European standards regarding violence, sexual behaviour, bodily functions, table manners and forms of speech were gradually transformed by increasing thresholds of shame and repugnance, working outward from a nucleus in court etiquette. Elias argues that this transformation is linked to the rise of centralized states, which enforced social order and promoted refined behavior among elites. These norms later spread to broader society through processes of socialization. As people learned to control impulses and follow social rules, a new self emerged—one that is disciplined, self-aware, and emotionally regulated. For Elias, culture and personality are deeply connected, and the rise of the modern self reflects larger political and social changes in European history. The internalized "self-restraint" imposed by increasingly complex networks of social connections developed the "psychological" self-perceptions that Freud recognized as the "super-ego." The second volume of The Civilizing Process looks into the causes of these processes and finds them in the increasingly centralized early modern state and the increasingly differentiated and interconnected web of society.

When Elias' work found a larger audience in the 1960s, at first his analysis of the process was misunderstood as an extension of discredited "social Darwinism," the idea of upward "progress" was dismissed by reading it as consecutive history rather than a metaphor for a social process.

Elias came to write both in English and German. Almost all his work on the sociology of knowledge and the sciences was written in English, as was his seminal work in the sociology of sport, collected in The Quest for Excitement, written by Norbert Elias with Eric Dunning, and published in 1986. Bielefeld University's Center for Sociology of Development in 1984 invited Norbert Elias to preside over a gathering of a host of his internationally distinguished fellows who in turn wanted to review and discuss Elias's theories on civilising processes in person.

In 1983, Elias established the Norbert Elias Foundation to administer his legacy after his death. The initial members of the board of the foundation were Johan Goudsblom (Amsterdam), Hermann Korte (Münster) and Abraham van Stolk, the latter replaced after his death in 1996 by Stephen Mennell (Dublin). In 2017 a new board took over the management of the Foundation: Johan Heilbron (Rotterdam and Paris), Jason Hughes (Leicester), Adrian Jitschin (Frankfurt), and Arjan Post (Secretary, Amsterdam).

Until he retired from the University of Leicester in 1962, Elias had published only one book, Über den Prozess der Zivilisation, and no more than a handful of articles. By the time of his death in 1990, he had published 15 books and something approaching 150 essays. He had always written a great deal, but found it very difficult ever to be satisfied with the results, and was very reluctant to release his work for publication. Still more curious, although he was such a perfectionist in his writing, he could rarely be persuaded to undertake such mundane tasks as reading and correcting the proofs. Thus, although his German works were well translated into English (for the most part by Edmund Jephcott), the original English editions contain many errors that could have been corrected by thorough proof-reading. In the early twenty-first century, therefore, the Norbert Elias Foundation entered into agreement with University College Dublin Press to publish new scholarly editions of Elias's work, running to 18 volumes.

== Collected works in English ==
A collected edition of Elias's works, published by University College Dublin Press, have been revised, cross-referenced and annotated (with notes especially about many historical people and events to which Elias makes reference), with a view to making them more accessible to the reader. Especially important are the three volumes of Elias's collected essays, many of which had not previously been published in English or were published in such a scattered way or in such obscure places that they were little known. (Other essays can also be found in Early Writings, Mozart and other volumes.)

The 18 volumes are as follows:

1. Early Writings, edited by Richard Kilminster (2006).
2. The Court Society, edited by Stephen Mennell (2006).
3. On the Process of Civilisation [note new title], edited by Stephen Mennell, Eric Dunning, Johan Goudsblom and Richard Kilminster (2012).
4. The Established and the Outsiders, edited by Cas Wouters (2008).
5. What is Sociology? edited by Artur Bogner, Katie Liston and Stephen Mennell (2012).
6. The Loneliness of the Dying and Human Condition, edited by Alan and Brigitte Scott (2009).
7. Quest for Excitement: Sport and Leisure in the Civilising Process, by Norbert Elias and Eric Dunning, edited by Eric Dunning (2008).
8. Involvement and Detachment, edited by Stephen Quilley (2007).
9. An Essay on Time, edited by Steven Loyal and Stephen Mennell (2007).
10. The Society of Individuals, edited by Robert van Krieken (2010).
11. Studies on the Germans [note new title], edited by Stephen Mennell and Eric Dunning (2013).
12. Mozart, and Other Essays on Courtly Culture, edited by Eric Baker and Stephen Mennell (2010).
13. The Symbol Theory, edited by Richard Kilminster (2011).
14. Essays I: On the Sociology of Knowledge and the Sciences, edited by Richard Kilminster and Stephen Mennell (2009).
15. Essays II: On Civilising Processes, State Formation and National Identity, edited by Richard Kilminster and Stephen Mennell (2008).
16. Essays III: On Sociology and the Humanities, edited by Richard Kilminster and Stephen Mennell (2009).
17. Interviews and Autobiographical Reflections, edited by Edmund Jephcott, Richard Kilminster, Katie Liston and Stephen Mennell (October 2013).
18. Supplements and Index to the Collected Works [includes major unpublished essays on Freud and on Lévy-Bruhl], edited by Stephen Mennell, Marc Joly and Katie Liston (2014).

There is also an additional supplementary volume: The Genesis of the Naval Profession, edited by René Moelker and Stephen Mennell (2007).

== Selected works ==
=== Books ===
In chronological order, by date of original publication:

- 1939: Über den Prozeß der Zivilisation. Soziogenetische und psychogenetische Untersuchungen. Erster Band. Wandlungen des Verhaltens in den weltlichen Oberschichten des Abendlandes and Zweiter Band. Wandlungen der Gesellschaft. Entwurf einer Theorie der Zivilisation. Basel: Verlag Haus zum Falken. (Published in English as The Civilizing Process, Vol.I. The History of Manners, Oxford: Blackwell, 1969, and The Civilizing Process, Vol.II. State Formation and Civilization, Oxford: Blackwell, 1982).
  - 2000: The Civilizing Process. Sociogenetic and Psychogenetic Investigations. Revised edition of 1994. Oxford: Basil Blackwell.
- 1965 (with John L. Scotson): The Established and the Outsiders. A Sociological Enquiry into Community Problems, London: Frank Cass & Co. (Originally published in English.)
- 1969: Die höfische Gesellschaft. Untersuchungen zur Soziologie des Königtums und der höfischen Aristokratie (based on the 1933 habilitation). Neuwied/Berlin: Luchterhand. (Published in English translation by Edmund Jephcott as The Court Society, Oxford: Blackwell, 1983).
- 1970: Was ist Soziologie?. München: Juventa. (Published in English as What is Sociology?, London: Hutchinson, 1978).
- 1982: Über die Einsamkeit der Sterbenden in unseren Tagen, Frankfurt am Main: Suhrkamp. (Published in English as The Loneliness of the Dying, Oxford: Blackwell, 1985).
- 1982 (edited with Herminio Martins and Richard Whitley): Scientific Establishments and Hierarchies. Sociology of the Sciences Yearbook 1982, Dordrecht: Reidel.
- 1983: Engagement und Distanzierung. Arbeiten zur Wissenssoziologie I, edited by Michael Schröter, Frankfurt am Main: Suhrkamp. (Published in English as Involvement and Detachment. Contributions to the Sociology of Knowledge, Oxford: Blackwell, 1987.)
- 1984: Über die Zeit. Arbeiten zur Wissenssoziologie II, edited by Michael Schröter, Frankfurt am Main: Suhrkamp. (Published in English as Time. An Essay, Oxford: Blackwell, 1991).
- 1985: Humana conditio. Betrachtungen zur Entwicklung der Menschheit am 40. Jahrestag eines Kriegsendes (8. Mai 1985), Frankfurt am Main: Suhrkamp. (Not available in English).
- 1986 (with Eric Dunning): Quest for Excitement. Sport and Leisure in the Civilizing Process. Oxford: Blackwell.
- 1987: Die Gesellschaft der Individuen, edited by Michael Schröter, Frankfurt am Main: Suhrkamp. (Original 1939, published in English as The Society of Individuals, Oxford: Blackwell, 1991).
- 1987: Los der Menschen. Gedichte, Nachdichtungen, Frankfurt am Main: Suhrkamp. (Poetry, not available in English).
- 1989: Studien über die Deutschen. Machtkämpfe und Habitusentwicklung im 19. und 20. Jahrhundert, edited by Michael Schröter, Frankfurt am Main: Suhrkamp. (Published in English as The Germans. Power struggles and the development of habitus in the 19th and 20th centuries, Cambridge: Polity Press 1996.)
- 1990: Über sich selbst, Frankfurt am Main: Suhrkamp. (Published in English as Reflections on a life, Cambridge: Polity Press, 1994).
- 1991: Mozart. Zur Soziologie eines Genies, edited by Michael Schröter, Frankfurt am Main: Suhrkamp. (Published in English as Mozart. Portrait of a Genius, Cambridge: Polity Press, 1993).
- 1991: The Symbol Theory. London: Sage. (Originally published in English.)
- 1996: Die Ballade vom armen Jakob, Frankfurt am Main: Insel Verlag (Drama, not available in English).
- 1998: Watteaus Pilgerfahrt zur Insel der Liebe, Weitra (Austria): Bibliothek der Provinz (Not available in English).
- 1998: The Norbert Elias Reader: A Biographical Selection, edited by Johan Goudsblom and Stephen Mennell, Oxford: Blackwell.
- 1999: Zeugen des Jahrhunderts. Norbert Elias im Gespräch mit Hans-Christian Huf, edited by Wolfgang Homering, Berlin: Ullstein. (Interview, not available in English).
- 2002: Frühschriften. Frankfurt am Main: Suhrkamp. (Early writings, not available in English.)
- 2004: Gedichte und Sprüche. Frankfurt am Main: Suhrkamp. (Translations of poems in English and French).

See also:

- Stephen Mennell (1989) Norbert Elias: Civilization and the Human Self-Image. Oxford: Basil Blackwell.
- Jonathan Fletcher (1997) Violence and Civilization: An Introduction to the Work of Norbert Elias. Cambridge: Polity.
- Robert van Krieken (1998) Norbert Elias. London: Routledge.
- Nathalie Heinich (2002) La sociologie de Norbert Elias. Paris: La Découverte.
- Steven Loyal and Steven Quilley (eds) (2004) The Sociology of Norbert Elias. Cambridge: Cambridge University Press.
- Eric Dunning and Jason Hughes (2013) Norbert Elias and Modern Sociology: Knowledge, Interdependence, Power, Process. London: Bloomsbury.
- Dépelteau, F. and Landini, T.S. (Ed. by) (2013) Norbert Elias & Social Theory. New York: Palgrave Macmillan.
- Landini, T.S. and Dépelteau, F. (Ed. by) (2014) Norbert Elias & Empirical Research. New York: Palgrave Macmillan.

=== Articles ===
- "Studies in the genesis of the naval profession", British Journal of Sociology, 1(4) 1950: 291–309.
- "Problems of involvement and detachment", British Journal of Sociology, 7(3) 1956: 226–252.
- "Sociology of knowledge: new perspectives. Part One", Sociology, 5(2): (1971): 149–168.
- "Sociology of knowledge: new perspectives. Part Two", Sociology, 5(3): (1971): 355–370.
- "Theory of science and history of science: comments on a recent discussion", Economy & Society, 1(2): (1972): 117–133.
- "The Civilizing Process revisited: interview with Stanislas Fontaine", Theory & Society, 5: (1978): 243–253.
- "On transformations of aggressiveness", Theory & Society, 5(2): (1978): 229–242.
- "Civilization and Violence: on the state monopoly of violence and its infringements". Telos, 54 (Winter 1982–83): 134–154.
- "The retreat of sociologists into the present", Theory, Culture & Society, 4: (1987): 223–247.
- "On human beings and their emotions: a process-sociological essay", Theory, Culture & Society, 4(2–3): (1987): 339–361.
- "The changing balance of power between the sexes – a process-sociological study: the example of the Ancient Roman state", Theory, Culture & Society, 4 (2–3): (1987): 287–316.
- "The Symbol Theory: An Introduction, Part One", Theory, Culture & Society, 6(2): (1989): 169–217.
- "Technization and civilization", Theory, Culture & Society, 12(3): (1995): 7–42.
- "Towards a theory of social processes", British Journal of Sociology, 48(3): (1997): 355–383.
- "Power and Civilisation", Journal of Power, 1(2): (2008): 135–142.
