= Sociological Research Online =

- Discipline: Sociology
- Language: English
- Edited by: Kahyrn Hughes, Angharad Beckett, Greg Hollin, Jason Hughes, Lucie Middlemiss, Anna Tarrant, Katy Wright

Publication details
- History: 1996–present
- Publisher: SAGE Publications on behalf of the British Sociological Association (United Kingdom)
- Frequency: Quarterly
- Impact factor: 2.417 (2019)

Standard abbreviations
- ISO 4: Sociol. Res. Online

Indexing
- ISSN: 1360-7804

Links
- Journal homepage

Sociological Research Online is a sociological journal, published quarterly (March, June, September, December) since March 1996. It is an online-only, peer-reviewed journal. It was originally published by a consortium of the British Sociological Association, SAGE Publications, the University of Surrey and the University of Stirling. In 2017, the University of Surrey and the University of Stirling stepped down and SAGE began publishing the journal on behalf of the British Sociological Association.

The journal is currently edited by Professor Kathryn Hughes (University of Leeds, UK), Dr Anna Tarrant (University of Lincoln, UK), Dr Angharad Beckett (University of Leeds, UK), Dr Greg Hollin (University of Leeds, UK), Professor Jason Hughes (University of Leicester, UK), Dr Katy Wright (University of Leeds, UK), and Professor Lucie Middlemiss (University of Leeds, UK).

== Abstracting, indexing and impact factor ==
The journal is indexed by ISI, EBSCO, SCOPUS and others. As of 2020, the journal had an impact factor of 2.417, ranking 56 out of 149 in Sociology.

== Access ==
The journal is available without charge to individuals who do not have access to institutional networks.
