= Robert van Krieken =

Australian sociologist (born 1952)

Robert van Krieken (born 1 April 1952) is an Australian sociologist and professor of sociology at the University of Sydney. His fields of research include the sociology of childhood, processes of civilization and decivilization, the formation of the self, sociological theory (especially that of Norbert Elias), celebrity, law and society, and cultural genocide.

== Early life and education ==
Robert Michael van Krieken was born on 1 April 1952 to Dutch parents in Hong Kong, where he attended primary school. Since secondary school, he has lived in Sydney, Australia. He studied sociology as part of a Bachelor of Arts degree at the University of New South Wales, where he also completed his PhD in 1977.

== Career ==
Van Krieken began his teaching career at the University of Sydney in 1979, teaching Social Theory in the Department of Social Work. In the 1990s, he played a central role in the development of a sociology programme at the University of Sydney, which since 2001 has been the core of the Department of Sociology & Social Policy. He also completed a law degree at the University of Sydney, gaining his LLB in 2003, which formed the foundation for the development of a programme in socio-legal studies, now also part of the Department of Sociology & Social Policy. He worked as Professor of Sociology at University College Dublin (2009–2011).

He is the author of Children and the State, Norbert Elias, Celebrity Society, and co-author of the sociology textbook Sociology (originally titled Sociology: Themes and Perspectives (Australian edition)), and Celebrity and the Law (with Patricia Loughlan and Barbara McDonald). He is currently on the editorial board of Contemporary Sociology, and he has also served on the editorial boards of Law & Social Inquiry and Childhood.

Van Krieken has served in a variety of offices in the International Sociological Association and is currently a board member of Working Group 02: Historical and Comparative Sociology. In 2006–2010, he was a member of the executive committee, and at the XVII World Congress of Sociology in Gothenburg, he was elected vice-president (finance and membership) for 2010–2014. He is also a member of The Australian Sociological Association.

== Selected works ==
=== Books ===
- Celebrity Society (Routledge, 2012) [ISBN 978-0415581509]
- Celebrity and the Law [with Patricia Loughlan & Babara McDonald] (Sydney: Federation Press, 2010) [ISBN 978-1862877382]
- Sociology (4th edition) [with P. Smith, D. Habibis, B. Hutchins, G. Martin, K. Maton] (Sydney: Pearson, 2010) [ISBN 978-0733993862]
- Norbert Elias] (London: Routledge, 1998). [ISBN 978-0415104166]
- Children and the State: Social Control and the Formation of Australian Child Welfare (Sydney: Allen & Unwin) [ISBN 978-1863730952]

=== Articles ===
- ‘Kumarangk (Hindmarsh Island) and the politics of natural justice under settler-colonialism’, Law & Social Inquiry 26(1) 2011: 125-49.
- ‘Cultural Genocide’, in The Historiography of Genocide, edited by Dan Stone, London: Palgrave Macmillan, 2008: 128-155.
- ‘The ethics of corporate legal personality’, in Management Ethics: Contemporary Contexts, edited by Stewart Clegg & Carl Rhodes, London: Routledge, 2006: 77-96.
- ‘Law's autonomy in action: anthropology and history in court’, Social & Legal Studies 15(4) 2006: 577-93.
- ‘The “best interests of the child” and parental separation: on the “civilizing of parents”’, Modern Law Review 68(1) 2005: 25-48.
- ‘The paradox of the ‘two sociologies’’: Hobbes, Latour and the constitution of modern social theory’, Journal of Sociology 38(3) 2002: 255-73
- ‘From Milirrpum to Mabo: the High Court, Terra Nullius and Moral Entrepreneurship’, UNSW Law Journal 23(1) 2000: 63-77.
- ‘The barbarism of civilization: cultural genocide and the ‘stolen generations’’, British J of Sociology 50(2) 1999: 295-313.
- ‘Sociology and the reproductive self: demographic transitions and modernity’ Sociology 31(3) 1997: 445-71.
- ‘The organisation of the soul: Elias and Foucault on discipline and the self’ Archives Europeénes de Sociologie 31(2) 1990: 353-71.
- ‘Violence, self-discipline and modernity: beyond the “civilizing process”’ Sociological Review 37(2) 1989: 193-218.
- ‘Social theory and child welfare: beyond social control’ Theory & Society 15(3) 1986: 401-29.
