= Heinrich Wilhelm Schäfer =

Heinrich Wilhelm Schäfer (born 1955) holds the chairs of Protestant Theology and Sociology of Religion at the Faculty of History, Philosophy and Theology and the Faculty of Sociology, Bielefeld University. He is member and co-founder of the Center for Interdisciplinary Research on Religion and Society.

== Biography ==
In 1983, 1985 and 1986 he conducted field research on religious movements (with emphasis on Pentecostalism) in the Central American civil wars based on the sociology of Bourdieu. From 1989 to 2006 he was pastor of the Protestant Church of Westfalia. In 1991 he received the title of "Dr. theol.". From 1992 to 1994 he served as Lecturer (Lehrbeauftragter) for Ecumenical Theology at the University of Bochum, Bochum. Between 1995 and 2003 he taught Systematic Theology and Social Sciences (emphasis on religion) at the Universidad Bíblica Latinoamericana, Costa Rica, as well as Religious and Cultural Studies at the Universidad Nacional, San José, Costa Rica. In this context he frequently taught and performed research in different Latin American countries, among others Brazil, Cuba, Mexico and Venezuela. Between 1998 and 2003 he participated in an international working group on religion and globalization of the World Council of Churches at Chateau de Bossey, Geneva. In 2002 he was awarded the titles "Dr. phil. (rer. soc.)" (Humboldt University, Berlin) and the post-doctoral "Habil. theol." (Ruhr-Universität, Bochum). From 2003 to 2006 he worked as Lecturer (Lehrbeauftragter) for Religious Studies at Leibniz University Hannover, Germany. Since 2006 he is professor at Bielefeld University, Germany.

== Academia ==
Since the early 1980s, he engages issues of religion, social inequality, and violence from a social science perspective, initiated during his university years studying and obtaining his doctorate, and subsequently continued in his function as teacher and researcher. He gained an insight into the state of civil war and criminal violence in the slums, primarily in Latin America. Since 2006, he conducts research also in Bosnia-Herzegovina. He also has been studying religious fundamentalism since the late 1970s (Iranian revolution). In a new research project on the religious field and political strategies of religious actors in Guatemala and Nicaragua, the religious transformations in periphery countries during the last 30 years will be studied comparatively. Much of Schäfer’s research on religious actors concentrates on the Pentecostal movement. In theoretical and methodological perspective Schäfer focuses on the sociology of Pierre Bourdieu. He has developed a method for Habitus-Analysis which will be published 2012 in English. In Theology Schäfer concentrates on interdisciplinary hermeneutics and pneumatology.

== Selected Research ==
- Social differentiation and identity-politics of the Pentecostal movement in Guatemala and Nicaragua (DFG, 2011–2013)
- Research network religion and Conflict (Protestant Research Association, 2007-ongoing)
- The ethos of religious peace builders in Bosnia-Herzegovina (DFG, 2008–2010)
- World religions in the process of globalization (World Council of Churches, 1998–2002)
- Fundamentalisms in the United States and Islamic countries (1992–2007)
- Cooperation in the Research network religion and Conflict (Protestant Research Association, 2007-ongoing)
- For more research, see the homepage of the Center for the interdisciplinary research on religion and society (CIRRuS)

== Selected publications ==
- 2015. HabitusAnalysis 1. Epistemology and Language. Wiesbaden: Springer VS.
- 2015. Identität als Netzwerk. Habitus, Sozialstruktur und religiöse Mobilisierung [Identity as network. Habitus, social structure and religious mobilization]. Wiesbaden: Springer VS.
- 2013. Pombagira y el obispo: sobre identidades religiosas transnacionales: La Igreja Universal do Reino de Deus en Brasil y Mozambique [Pombagira and the bishop: about transnational religious identities: The Universal Church of the Kingdom of God in Brazil and Mozambique]. Form for inter-American research (fiar) 6(1).
- 2012. Art.: Protestantismus. In Das Lateinamerika-Lexikon, ed. Silke Hensel and Barbara Potthast, 274-277. Wuppertal: Peter Hammer Verlag.
- 2010. Explaining Central American Pentecostalism within social inequality and conflict. On habitus-analysis as a clue to describe religious praxis. In Pentecostal Power: Expressions, Impact and Faith of Latin American Pentecostalism, ed. Calvin L. Smith, 137-156. Leiden/Boston: Brill.
- 2009. Latin America – dynamics of the religious field. In What the World Believes: Analysis and Commentary on the Religion Monitor 2008, ed. Bertelsmann Foundation, 463–485. Gütersloh: Verlag Bertelsmann Stiftung.
- 2009. The Pentecostal movement – social change and religious habitus. In What the World Believes: Analysis and Commentary on the Religion Monitor 2008, ed. Bertelsmann Foundation, 533–585. Gütersloh: Verlag Bertelsmann Stiftung.
- 2008. Fundamentalismos, modernidades y tensiones políticas globales. Sobre la religión políticamente movilizada [Fundamentalisms, modern spirits and global political tensions]. Estudos de Religião 35, 87–107. São Paulo: U-Metodista.
- 2008. Kampf der Fundamentalismen: Radikales Christentum, radikaler Islam und Europas Moderne. [The Struggle of Fundamentalisms: Radical Christianity, Radical Islam, and Europe’s Modern Spirit] Frankfurt a. M.: Verlag der Weltreligionen (Suhrkamp).
- 2007. “We gonna bin laden them!” Überlegungen zu einer methodologisch-kommunitaristischen Friedensethik” [“We gonna bin laden them!“ Considerations on a methodologic-communitarian ethics of peace]. Zeitschrift für evangelische Ethik 51(3): 169–181.
- 2005. Identität als Netzwerk: Ein Theorieentwurf am Beispiel religiöser Bewegungen im Bürgerkrieg Guatemalas [Identity as network: A theoretical outline exemplified by religious movements in the Guatemalan civil war]. Berliner Journal für Soziologie 15(2): 259–282.
- 2004. Praxis - Theologie - Religion: Grundlinien einer Theologie und Religionstheorie im Anschluss an Pierre Bourdieu. Frankfurt: Lembeck, 445 p. (Praxis - Theology - Religion. Outlines of a theory on theology and religion following Pierre Bourdieu).
- 2004. The Janus face of religion: On the religious factor in new wars. Numen 51(4): 407–431.
- 2004. „Und weil der Mensch ein Mensch ist...“: Interkulturelle Ethik, religiöse Identität und Konflikt. [„Because a human being is a human being….“: Intercultural Ethics, Religious Identity, and Conflict]. Sicherheit und Frieden 22(3): 139–146.
- 1992. Protestantismo y crisis social en América Central. [Protestantism and Social Crisis in Central America]. San José: Departamento Ecuménico de Investigaciones.
- 1990. Church identity between repression and liberation: The Presbyterian Church in Guatemala. Studies from the World Alliance of Reformed Churches, 178. Geneva: World Alliance of Reformed Churches.
