= The Civilizing Process =

1939 book by Norbert Elias

- Author: Norbert Elias
- Original title: Über den Prozeß der Zivilisation
- Language: German
- Subject: Sociology
- Published: 1939
- Publication place: Switzerland (Basel)
- Media type: Print

The Civilizing Process is a book by German sociologist Norbert Elias. It is an influential work in sociology and Elias' most important work. It was first published in Basel, Switzerland in two volumes in 1939 in German as Über den Prozeß der Zivilisation.

Because of World War II, it was virtually ignored, but gained popularity when it was republished in 1969 and eventually translated into English. Covering European history from roughly 800 AD to 1900 AD, it is the first formal analysis and theory of civilization. Elias proposes a double sociogenesis of the state: the social development of the state has two sides, mental and political. The civilisation process that Elias describes results in a profound change in human behaviour. It leads to the construction of the modern state and transition of man from the warrior of the Middle Ages to the civil man of the end of the 19th century.

The Civilizing Process is today regarded as the founding work of figurational sociology. In 1998 the International Sociological Association listed the work as the seventh most important sociological book of the 20th century.

== Themes ==
The first volume, The History of Manners, traces the historical developments of the European habitus, or "second nature", the particular individual psychic structures molded by social attitudes. Elias traced how post-medieval European standards regarding violence, sexual behaviour, bodily functions, table manners and forms of speech were gradually transformed by increasing thresholds of shame and repugnance, working outward from a nucleus in court etiquette. The internalized "self-restraint" imposed by increasingly complex networks of social connections developed the "psychological" self-perceptions that Sigmund Freud recognized as the "super-ego".

The second volume, State Formation and Civilization, looks into the formation of the state and the theory of civilisation. First, Elias explains that throughout time, social unity increased its control over military and fiscal power until possessing the monopoly over it. The progressive monopolisation of the military and taxation were feeding one another (the political power was using tax money to pay its army and using the army to collect the taxes). Elias describes several steps of the creation of the State:

- From the 11th to the 13th c.: there was an open competition between different houses where everyone was fighting to maintain and extend its power. For instance, after the death of Charles IV of France (1328), France formed a powerful agglomeration of territories. However, one cannot speak of a coherent kingdom yet because regional consciousness was still predominant, the interests of each territory and seigneury were prevailing.
- From the 14th to the 16th c.: the courts were progressively established, and vassals gathered around important lords. The feudality was princely (it was seigneurial before) because only the most powerful houses had maintained their power and extended it by taking over the territory of smaller houses.
- After the 16th c.: the royal house is victorious and has a monopoly of power. It created a central administration and institutions. The competitions were now regulated: it takes place peacefully within the state to access a high position in the administration.

At the end of the process, the State is created and possessed the monopoly of legitimate physical violence. Elias also describes that the "absolutist mechanism": the state became the supreme body that coordinates the different interdependent group of the society.

In parallel of the sociogeneses of the state, Elias notes the change in the way to manage the bodily functions. Individuals tried to repress in themselves what is perceived to be part of animal nature, repress in a sphere that appears through time, intimacy. Hence, new feelings appeared: embarrassment and prudishness.

== Reception ==
A particular criticism of The Civilizing Process was formulated by German ethnologist and cultural anthropologist Hans Peter Duerr in his 5-volume Der Mythos vom Zivilisationsprozeß (1988–2002), pointing out there existed plenty of social restrictions and regulations in Western culture and elsewhere since long before the Medieval period. Elias and his supporters responded that he had never intended to claim that social regulations or self-restraining psychological agents would be institutions singular to Western modernity, it is just that Western culture developed particularly sophisticated, concise, comprehensive, and rigid institutions apparent for instance in its decisive technological advances when compared to other cultures.

== English editions ==
- The Civilizing Process, Vol.I. The History of Manners, Oxford: Blackwell, 1978
- The Civilizing Process, Vol.II. State Formation and Civilization, Oxford: Blackwell, 1982
- The Civilizing Process. Oxford: Blackwell, 1994 [First single-volume edition, with badly mangled text, especially in the table manners section
- The Civilizing Process. Sociogenetic and Psychogenetic Investigations. Partially revised edition. Oxford: Blackwell, 2000
- On the Process of Civilisation: Sociogenetic and Psychogenetic Investigations. Dublin: University College Dublin Press, 2012 [Collected Works, vol. 3, thoroughly revised and with full colour reproductions of works of art discussed by Elias].
