= Bernard Lahire =

French sociologist

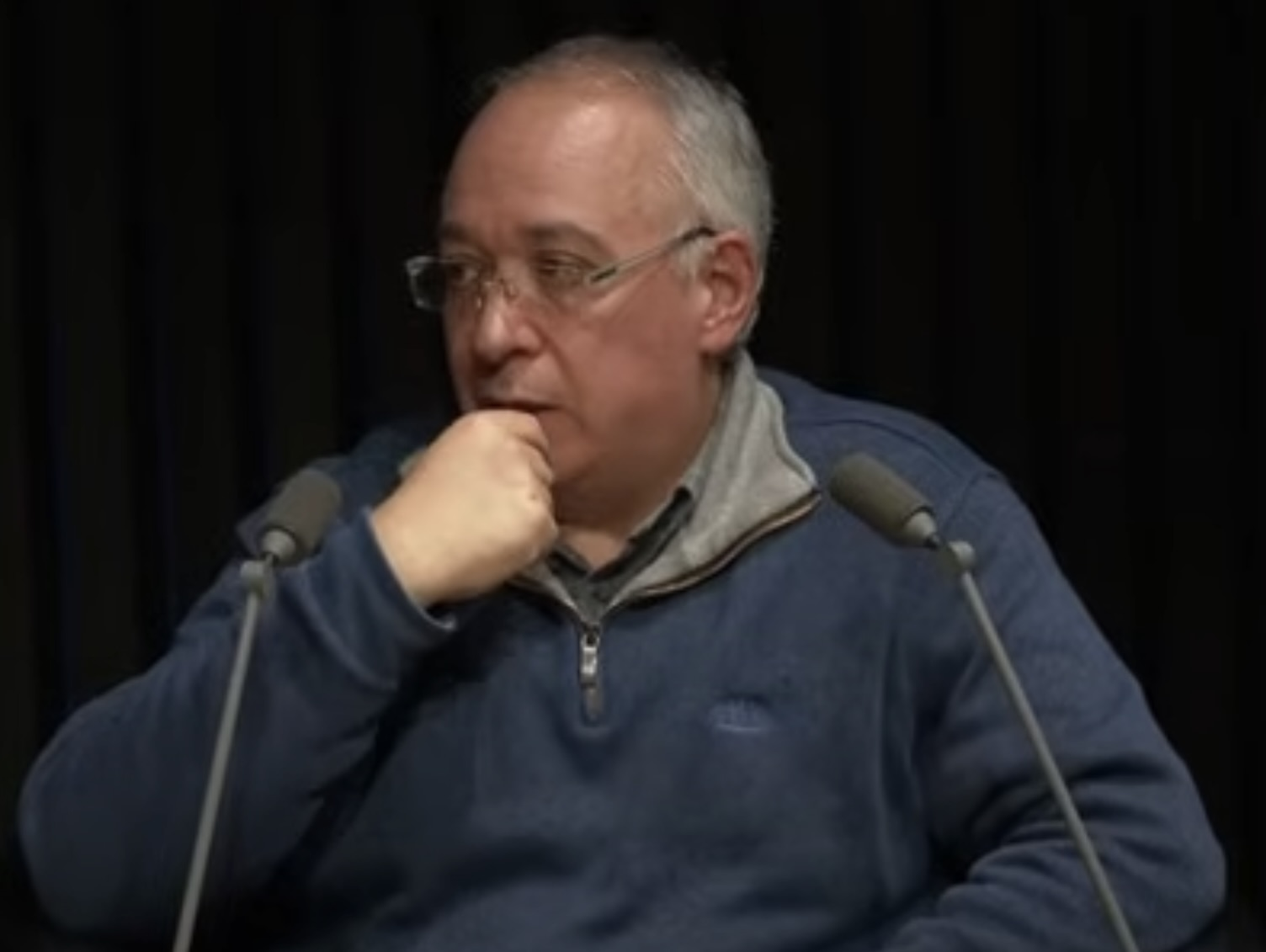
Image of Bernard Lahire

Bernard Lahire (French pronunciation: [bɛʁnaʁ la.iʁ], born 9 November 1963 in Lyon) is a French sociologist and author who serves as a professor of sociology at the ENSL graduate school in Lyon. Lahire is also a member of the Max Weber Center for Advanced Cultural and Social Studies. By the late 2000s, Lahire rose to prominence as one of the country's most eminent living sociologists.

== Early Work ==
Lahire's early work involved a critical discussion of Pierre Bourdieu. In his edited volume Le travail sociologique de Pierre Bourdieu: Dettes et critiques (The Sociological Work of Pierre Bourdieu: Uses and Criticisms), he contributed chapters critiquing the concepts of field and habitus. Lahire's main contention was that these concepts were useful as heuristics, but also risked overgeneralisation.

== The Plural Actor ==
To Lahire many aspects of human activity or practices escape the overly narrow contours of fields, even if they are differentiated from other activities. Similarly, he argued that while there were conditions where actors embodied unitary and homogeneous dispositions, this is not always the case. This latter point was elaborated in some considerable detail in his 1998 L’Homme pluriel: Les ressorts de l’action, translated in 2005 as The Plural Actor.

In the book, Lahire raises a number of issues around Bourdieu's formulation of the concept of habitus. Beyond the questions about the unitary nature of habitus, he raises the question of whether social action is so overwhelmingly pre-reflexive and practical as Bourdieu suggests. More generally, with the book Lahire signaled a focus on the processes whereby dispositions actually become embodied, i.e., socialization. The approach thereby highlights how concrete individuals are socially shaped by a number of factors. In the book, the approach is called psychological sociology, but Lahire now refers to it as a sociology at the level of the individual. It is also sometimes called a dispositionalist-contextualist approach.

== Sociology at the level of the individual ==
The theoretical programme outlined in The Plural Actor was followed up empirically in his Portraits sociologique (Sociological Portraits). The book pioneers his approach of sociological biography, as a concrete way to "do" the sociology at the level of the individual. The book is based on repeated interviews with a limited number of cases. Thus, Lahire aimed to show the concrete social moulding of each individual, unpacking their dispositions and tracing them to socializing experiences.

The issue of the dissonance of dispositions was followed through in what was for long his most famous work, La culture des individus (The Culture of Individuals) from 2006. The book continues from a point made in The Plural Actor, that on the macro scale, it makes sense to describe classes as having or embodying dispositions that set them apart from other classes. However, once the focus is changed to the individual scale, one uncovers a great variety of dispositions, or at least, different cultural practices, which vary with contexts.

The program of a sociology at the level of the individual has been brought further with the study of class inequalities among children in 2019's Enfances de classe: De l’inégalité parmi les enfants (Classroom Childhood: Inequality Among Children). The book studies 35 children from different classes, in-depth by combining ethnographic observations with interviews of parents, family friends, teachers and grandparents. This unearths how these children may live in the same society, but effectively in different worlds, as Lahire as said in a summary. Lahire's latest publications represent a radicalization of the psychological sociology inherent in his thinking, with a two volume book dedicated to the sociological interpretation of dreams, the first of volume of which has appeared in English.

== Publications ==
Lahire has authored a wide range of books, papers and chapters, with only a minority of them appearing in English. The most central English translations are The Plural Actor (1998), The Sociological Interpretation of Dreams (2018) and This is Not Just a Painting (2019).
