= William Cockerham =

American sociologist

William Carl Cockerham
- Born: March 31, 1939 (age 87); Oklahoma City, Oklahoma, U.S.
- Known for: Health lifestyle theory
- Awards: Leo G. Reeder Award (American Sociological Association), ScholarGPS Top-Ranked Scholar, Distinguished Service Medal (U.S. Army), Legion of Merit (U.S. Army), Fulbright Fellowship

Academic background
- Education: University of Oklahoma; University of California, Berkeley; Harvard Kennedy School

Academic work
- Discipline: Medical sociology, sociological theory
- Institutions: University of Maryland, College Park, University of Alabama at Birmingham

William Carl Cockerham (born March 31, 1939) is an American sociologist recognized for his contributions to medical sociology and sociological theory. He is currently a Research Professor of Sociology at the University of Maryland, College Park, and holds emeritus status at the University of Alabama at Birmingham (UAB), where he served as Distinguished Professor and Chair of the Department of Sociology. He is noted for developing health lifestyle theory.

== Early life and education ==
Cockerham earned a Ph.D. from the University of California, Berkeley in 1971, specializing in sociology, psychology, and education. He also received a Master of Journalism from Berkeley in 1968 and a Bachelor of Arts in history from the University of Oklahoma in 1962.

== Academic career ==
Cockerham began his academic career at the University of Wyoming and later joined the University of Illinois Urbana-Champaign, where he held joint appointments in sociology, psychiatry, and medicine. In 1991, he joined UAB, where he remained for over two decades in various leadership roles. These included Chair of the Department of Sociology, Interim Chair of the Department of Social Work, and Senior Scientist at UAB’s Minority Health and Health Equity Research Center in the Division of Preventive Medicine.

He also held visiting appointments at universities in Austria, Germany, and Scotland. From 2018 to 2023, he was a Research Scholar at the College of William & Mary before taking up his current position at the University of Maryland.

== Research and publications ==
Cockerham’s sociological research focuses on health lifestyle, health disparities, social determinants of health, mental illness, and international public health. He has conducted comparative studies across the United States, Europe, the former Soviet Union, and Asia.

He is the author or editor of more than 30 books and hundreds of scholarly articles. His widely adopted textbook Medical Sociology has been translated into several languages and is considered foundational in the field.

== Honors and recognition ==
- Leo G. Reeder Award for Distinguished Contribution to Medical Sociology by the American Sociological Association’s Section on Medical Sociology (2026).
- Designation as Distinguished Professor of Sociology by the University of Alabama Board of Trustees (2005)
- Caroline P. and Charles W. Ireland Award for Scholarly Distinction (UAB, 2004)
- UAB President’s Award for Extraordinary Professional Achievement (1995)
- Fulbright Fellowship in Germany (1985)

== Selected works ==
- Cockerham, William C. (2026). The Social Causes of Health and Disease (4th ed.). Cambridge, UK: Polity. ISBN 978-1-509-567225.
- Cockerham, William C.; Gabe, Jonathan; Quah, Stella R; Ryan, Michael J. (2026). The Wiley Blackwell Encyclopedia of Health, Illness, Behavior, and Society (2nd ed.). Hoboken, NJ: John Wiley & Sons. ISBN 978-1-394-36500-5.
- Cockerham, William C. (2025). Medical Sociology (16th ed.). New York: Routledge. ISBN 978-1-0329-07864.
- Cockerham, William C. (ed.). (2025). Medical Sociology on the Move, Revised Edition, including New Directions in Theory (2nd ed.). Cham, Switzerland: Springer Nature. ISBN 978-3-031-92455-2.
- Cockerham, William C. (2024). Sociology of Mental Disorder (12th ed.). New York: Routledge. ISBN 978-1-032-52604-1.
- Cockerham, William C. 2023. “Health Lifestyle Theory in a Changing Society: The Rise of Infectious Diseases and Digitalization.” Journal of Health and Social Behavior 64(3):437-451.
- Cockerham, William C. (2021). Sociological Theories of Health and Illness. New York: Routledge. ISBN 9780367469085.
- Cockerham, William C.; Dingwall, Robert; Quah, Stella R. (2014). The Wiley Blackwell Encyclopedia of Health, Illness, Behavior, and Society (1 ed.). Chichester: Wiley. ISBN 978-1-4443-3076-2.
- Cockerham, William C. (2021). The Wiley Blackwell Companion to Medical Sociology. John Wiley & Sons. ISBN 978-1-119-63375-4.
- Cockerham, William; Cockerham, Geoffrey (2021). The Covid-19 Reader: The Science and What It Says About the Social. Routledge. ISBN 978-1-000-33260-5.
- Cockerham, William C. (April 3, 2013). Medical Sociology on the Move: New Directions in Theory. Springer Science & Business Media. ISBN 978-94-007-6193-3.
