= Johan Goudsblom =

Dutch sociologist

Personal details
- Born: 1932 Netherlands
- Died: 2020 (aged 87–88) Amsterdam, Netherlands

Johan Goudsblom (1932–2020) was a Dutch sociologist.

== Background ==
Goudsblom was born on 11 October 1932. After completing his high school, he attended an American university. He served at the professor emeritus of sociology at the University of Amsterdam.

Goudsblom died on 17 March 2020 in Amsterdam, Netherlands.

== Awards and honours ==
He received the Buskenstraat Huet Prize in 1975.

== Bibliography ==
His notable books include:

- The Course of Human History: Civilization and Social Process: Civilization and Social Process
- Civilizing Processes—Myth or Reality? A Comment on Duerr's Critique of Elias
- Toward a morality of moderation. Report for the Dutch national research programme on global air pollution and climate change
- Human History and Social Process
- Nihilism and Culture
