= Deaths in July 2022 =

The following is a list of notable deaths in July 2022.

Entries for each day are listed alphabetically by surname. A typical entry lists information in the following sequence:

- Name, age, country of citizenship at birth, subsequent country of citizenship (if applicable), reason for notability, cause of death (if known), and reference.

== July 2022 ==
=== 1 ===
- Carla Bazzanella, 75, Italian linguist.
- Angela Bonallack, 85, English amateur golfer.
- Eddie Brooks, 72, Australian Olympic water polo player (1976).
- Drew Busby, 74, Scottish footballer (Airdrieonians, Hearts, Toronto Blizzard).
- Irene Fargo, 59, Italian singer and stage actress.
- Edward Feiner, 75, American architect, brain cancer.
- Pedro Pablo García Caffi, 77, Argentine musician and singer.
- Raul Nicolau Gonçalves, 95, Indian Roman Catholic prelate, auxiliary bishop (1967–1978) and archbishop (1978–2003) of Goa and Daman, patriarch of the East Indies (1978–2003).
- Árni Gunnarsson, 82, Icelandic journalist and politician.
- Robb Hanrahan, 60, American journalist (WHP-TV).
- Joe Hatton, 74, Puerto Rican Olympic basketball player (1968, 1972).
- Peter Imre, 60, Romanian businessman, cancer.
- Yuri Khaliullin, 78, Russian naval officer.
- Bob King, 87, Australian lawn bowler.
- Tjahjo Kumolo, 64, Indonesian politician, twice MP, minister of home affairs (2014–2019) and bureaucratic reform (since 2019), multiple organ failure.
- Stanislav Leonovich, 63, Russian Olympic figure skater (1980).
- Alan McCleery, 93, Canadian Olympic sprint canoeist (1960).
- Dermot O'Neill, 58, Irish gardener and journalist.
- Gary Pearson, 45, English football player (York City, Darlington) and manager (Crook Town), complications from a heart attack.
- Maurizio Pradeaux, 91, Italian film director (Death Carries a Cane, Death Steps in the Dark, Churchill's Leopards) and screenwriter.
- Luis Alberto Rodríguez López-Calleja, 62, Cuban military officer, businessman, and politician, heart attack.
- Rainer Scholz, 67, German football player (Hannover 96, Waldhof Mannheim) and manager (Darmstadt 98).
- Reanna Solomon, 40, Nauruan Olympic weightlifter (2004), COVID-19.
- George R. Stotser, 87, American lieutenant general.
- Richard Taruskin, 77, American musicologist (Oxford History of Western Music), esophageal cancer.
- Roger Tighe, 77, English boxer.

=== 2 ===
- David Blackwood, 80, Canadian visual artist.
- Peter Brook, 97, English theatre and film director (Lord of the Flies, Ride of the Valkyrie, Marat/Sade), Tony winner (1966, 1971).
- Mick Crane, 69, British rugby league player (Hull, Leeds Rhinos, national team).
- Alain de Cadenet, 76, English racing driver and television presenter (Legends of Motorsport, Victory by Design), bile duct cancer.
- Susana Dosamantes, 74, Mexican actress (Rio Lobo, Day of the Assassin, El Juramento), pancreatic cancer.
- Miguel Etchecolatz, 93, Argentine police officer (National Reorganization Process) and convicted mass murderer (Night of the Pencils).
- Jane Garrett, 49, Australian politician, Victorian MLA (2010–2018) and MLC (since 2018), mayor of Yarra (2009–2010), breast cancer.
- Walter Goldbeck, 77, German politician, member of the Landtag of Mecklenburg-Vorpommern (1990–1994).
- Andy Goram, 58, Scottish footballer (Oldham Athletic, Rangers, national team), esophageal cancer.
- Alec Heggie, 78, Scottish actor.
- Ed Hindson, 77, American televangelist and academic (Liberty University).
- Francisco Huerta Montalvo, 82, Ecuadorian doctor and politician, mayor of Guayaquil (1970), minister of public health (1982–1983) and of the interior (2000), heart attack.
- Doreen Hume, 95, Canadian operatic soprano.
- Brian Jackson, 91, British actor (Carry On Sergeant, Some Like It Cool, Revenge of the Pink Panther), cancer.
- Dmitry Kolker, 54, Russian physicist, pancreatic cancer.
- Alex Law, 69, Hong Kong film director (Painted Faces, Echoes of the Rainbow) and screenwriter (An Autumn's Tale), heart attack.
- Peter Lee, 84, American Episcopal prelate, bishop of Virginia (1985–2009).
- Ryan Leone, 36, American novelist and prison reform activist, drug intoxication.
- D. R. O'Connor Lysaght, 81, Welsh-born Irish historian and scholar.
- Anne Neville, 52, British engineer, cancer.
- Laurent Noël, 102, Canadian Roman Catholic prelate, auxiliary bishop of Quebec (1963–1975) and bishop of Trois-Rivières (1975–1996).
- Jim Van Pelt, 86, American football player (Michigan Wolverines, Winnipeg Blue Bombers).
- Jeffrey Plale, 54, American politician, Wisconsin Railroad commissioner (2011–2016), member of the Wisconsin State Assembly (1996–2003) and Senate (2003–2011), complications from a lung infection.
- Mike Reynolds, 92, American voice actor (Akira, Castle in the Sky, VR Troopers).
- Saúl Rivero, 67, Uruguayan football player (Atlético Español, national team) and manager (Progreso).
- Raymond Shamberger, 87, American biochemist.
- Leonid Shvartsman, 101, Russian animator (Cheburashka, 38 Parrots, The Scarlet Flower).
- Roland Stănescu, 32, Romanian footballer (Petrolul Ploiești, FC Argeș), suicide by jumping.
- Susie Steiner, 51, British novelist and journalist (The Guardian), brain cancer.
- Herman D. Suit, 93, American physician and radiation oncologist.
- Félix Tonye Mbog, 88, Cameroonian politician, minister of foreign affairs (1983–1984).
- John Watson, 73, American football player (San Francisco 49ers, New Orleans Saints).
- Spider Webb, 78, American tattoo artist, chronic obstructive pulmonary disease.

=== 3 ===
- Irving Abella, 82, Canadian labour and Judaism historian (None Is Too Many).
- Clifford Alexander Jr., 88, American lawyer, secretary of the Army (1977–1981).
- Joseph Banowetz, 87, American classical pianist and pedagogue.
- Idelisa Bonnelly, 90, Dominican marine biologist.
- Liliana Caldini, 70, Argentine model, actress and television host.
- Len Casey, 91, English footballer (Plymouth Argyle, Chelsea).
- Miu Chu, 40, Taiwanese singer, breast cancer.
- Islay Conolly, 99, Caymanian school administrator.
- Robert Curl, 88, American chemist, Nobel prize laureate (1996).
- Gordon P. Eaton, 93, American geologist.
- Eoin Farrell, 40, Irish Gaelic footballer (Westmeath GAA).
- Clément Fayat, 90, French construction executive (Fayat Group).
- Fernando García de Cortázar, 79, Spanish priest and historian, peritonitis.
- Lennart Hjulström, 83, Swedish actor (My Life as a Dog, Codename Coq Rouge, The Girl Who Kicked the Hornets' Nest) and director.
- Soila Komi, 79, Finnish actress.
- Nikolai Kostechko, 75, Russian military and intelligence officer, Hero of the Russian Federation (2000), chief of staff and first deputy director of the GRU.
- Judy Barrett Litoff, 77, American editor and author, complications following surgery.
- Jack Monaghan, 100, New Zealand amateur wrestler.
- Ni Kuang, 87, Hong Kong screenwriter (One-Armed Swordsman, Fist of Fury, The Seventh Curse) and novelist, skin cancer.
- Barry Ronge, 74, South African film critic and author.
- Sérgio Paulo Rouanet, 88, Brazilian diplomat, minister of culture (1991–1992).
- Dave Shearer, 63, Scottish footballer (Middlesbrough, Gillingham).
- Jerry Shoemake, 79, American politician.
- Sergey Sosnovsky, 67, Russian actor (To Live, Metro, The Factory).
- Leandro Soto, 66, Cuban-American artist, cancer.
- Earlie Thomas, 76, American football player (New York Jets, Denver Broncos).
- Gavin Thorley, 75, New Zealand Olympic long-distance runner (1972).
- Charles Wesley Turnbull, 87, American politician, governor of the United States Virgin Islands (1999–2007).
- Stewart Turner, 92, Australian geophysicist.

=== 4 ===
- Khairy Alzahaby, 76, Syrian novelist and historian.
- Richard J. Bernstein, 90, American philosopher.
- Alan Blaikley, 82, English songwriter ("Have I the Right?", "The Legend of Xanadu", "I've Lost You") and composer.
- Elena Bodnarenco, 57, Moldovan politician, three-term deputy, and mayor of Soroca (2011–2015), cancer.
- Remco Campert, 92, Dutch writer.
- Bailey Doogan, 80, American painter.
- Hubert Erang, 91, Luxembourgish Olympic gymnast (1952, 1960).
- Jeremiah Farrell, 84, American mathematician.
- Gabriel Fourmigué, 55, French Olympic bobsledder (1992, 1994), shot.
- Hank Goldberg, 82, American sports journalist (WQAM, ESPN), kidney disease.
- Miguel González, 83, Spanish Olympic basketball player (1960).
- Paolo Grossi, 89, Italian jurist, judge (2009–2018) and president (2016–2018) of the Constitutional Court.
- Mona Hammond, 87, Jamaican-British actress (EastEnders, Desmond's, Us Girls).
- Robert Hoffmann, 82, Austrian actor (The Adventures of Robinson Crusoe, The Last Roman, The Sea Wolves).
- Cláudio Hummes, 87, Brazilian Roman Catholic cardinal, archbishop of Fortaleza (1996–1998) and São Paulo (1998–2006), prefect for the Clergy (2006–2010).
- Janusz Kupcewicz, 66, Polish football player (Arka Gdynia, Lech Poznań, national team) and manager, stroke.
- Toto Landero, 26, Filipino boxer, drowned.
- Betty Levin, 94, American writer.
- Tarun Majumdar, 91, Indian film director (Balika Badhu, Kuheli, Shriman Prithviraj).
- Mac McLendon, 76, American golfer (PGA Tour).
- Clive Middlemass, 77, English football player (Leeds United, Workington) and manager (Carlisle United).
- Ronald Moon, 81, American judge, associate (1990–1993) and chief justice (1993–2010) of the Supreme Court of Hawaii.
- Kunihiko Saitō, 87, Japanese politician and diplomat, ambassador to the United States (1995–1999), prostate cancer.
- Robert B. Sheeks, 100, American soldier.
- Russell Stannard, 90, British physicist.
- Aleksei Sveshnikov, 97, Russian mathematical physicist.
- Kazuki Takahashi, 60, Japanese manga artist (Yu-Gi-Oh!), drowned.
- Patrick Watson, 92, Canadian broadcaster.

=== 5 ===
- Arne Åhman, 97, Swedish triple jumper, Olympic champion (1948).
- Mohammed Barkindo, 63, Nigerian politician, secretary general of OPEC (since 2016).
- David Beetham, 83–84, British social theorist.
- Louise Berry, 94, American politician.
- Lisetta Carmi, 98, Italian photographer.
- Manny Charlton, 80, Scottish rock guitarist (Nazareth).
- Lenny Von Dohlen, 63, American actor (Twin Peaks, Electric Dreams, Home Alone 3).
- Cacho Fontana, 90, Argentine broadcaster.
- Elizabeth Grant, 58, Australian anthropologist.
- Joe Hueglin, 85, Canadian politician, MP (1972–1974).
- Ho Wang Lee, 93, South Korean virologist and epidemiologist.
- Alfred Koerppen, 95, German organist and composer.
- Maurice Lamoureux, 88, Canadian politician, mayor of Sudbury (1981–1982).
- P. Gopinathan Nair, 99, Indian social worker and independence activist, complications from COVID-19.
- Reginald Otto, 78, South African lieutenant general.
- Binette Schroeder, 82, German author and illustrator.
- Subramaniam Sinniah, 77, Malaysian politician, MP (1974–1978, 1982–2004), complications from ruptured aneurysm.
- Ted Sulkowicz, 67, Australian rugby player.
- Bob Tutupoly, 82, Indonesian singer, host and actor, stroke.
- José Vicente, 100, Puerto Rican Olympic pole vaulter (1948, 1952).

=== 6 ===
- Masashi Aoyagi, 65, Japanese karateka and professional wrestler (FMW, NJPW, NOAH).
- Joe Barry, 90, Irish television executive.
- Ed Bauta, 87, Cuban baseball player (St. Louis Cardinals, New York Mets).
- James Caan, 82, American actor (The Godfather, Thief, Misery), heart attack.
- Jacqueline Challet-Haas, 87, French dancer and professor.
- Tony Comber, 95, English clergyman, archdeacon of Leeds (1982–1992).
- Lynn Dean, 98, American politician, member of the Louisiana State Senate (1996–2004).
- Dale Douglass, 86, American golfer (PGA Tour).
- Jerome M. Eisenberg, 92, American antiquities dealer.
- Bryan Marchment, 53, Canadian ice hockey player (San Jose Sharks, Edmonton Oilers, Chicago Blackhawks).
- Royce W. Murray, 85, American chemist.
- Jacob Nena, 80, Micronesian politician, president (1997–1999) and vice president (1991–1996), governor of Kosrae (1979–1983).
- Mihăiță Nițulescu, 53, Romanian boxer, stroke.
- Arnaldo Pambianco, 86, Italian Olympic racing cyclist (1956).
- Slava Rabinovich, 56, Russian-American financial analyst and columnist. (death announced on this date)
- Achim Stadler, 60, German Olympic cyclist (1984).
- William Tobin, 68, British-New Zealand astronomer.
- Tricia, 65, Vietnamese-born Australian Asian elephant.
- İlter Türkmen, 94, Turkish diplomat and politician, minister of foreign affairs (1980–1983).
- Ira Valentine, 59, American football player (Houston Oilers), heart attack.
- Norah Vincent, 53, American journalist and author (Self-Made Man), assisted suicide.
- Bruce Wands, 72, American educator and author.
- Ing-Marie Wieselgren, 64, Swedish psychiatrist, stabbed.
- Hans Wortmann, 72, Dutch computer scientist (University of Groningen).

=== 7 ===
- Waldo Rubén Barrionuevo Ramírez, 54, Bolivian Roman Catholic prelate, auxiliary bishop (2014–2019) and vicar apostolic (since 2019) of Reyes.
- János Berecz, 91, Hungarian politician, MP (1985–1990).
- Mike Brito, 87, Cuban-American baseball scout (Los Angeles Dodgers).
- Dewey Brundage, 90, American football player (Pittsburgh Steelers).
- Peter Burwash, 77, Canadian tennis player, coach, and commentator.
- Chen Jialin, 79, Chinese television director (Wu Zetian, Tang Ming Huang, Kangxi Dynasty).
- Barbara Delaplace, 69, Canadian author.
- Max Eisen, 93, Slovak-Canadian author and Holocaust survivor.
- George Elder, 101, American baseball player (St. Louis Browns).
- Pedro Ferrándiz, 93, Spanish basketball coach (Real Madrid, national team).
- Ian Glynn, 94, British biologist.
- Marco Goldschmied, 78, British architect.
- Robert Halbritter, 92, American judge and politician, member of the West Virginia House of Delegates (1966–1971).
- Kris Hansen, 52, American politician, member of the Montana House of Representatives (2011–2015).
- R. C. Harvey, 85, American cartoonist and comics historian, complications from a fall.
- Donald Nuechterlein, 97, American diplomat.
- Ian Oliver, 82, Scottish police officer, chief constable of Central Scotland Police (1979–1990) and Grampian Police (1990–1998).
- Walter Pierce, 91, American impresario.
- José Ramírez Gamero, 84, Mexican politician, deputy (1976–1988, 1997–2003) and governor of Durango (1986–1992).
- Shambu Tamang, 70, Nepalese mountaineer, cancer.
- Adam Wade, 87, American singer ("The Writing on the Wall") and television host (Musical Chairs), complications from Parkinson's disease.
- Phil Walker, 67, English footballer (Boavista, Millwall, Charlton Athletic).
- Cornell Webster, 67, American football player (Seattle Seahawks).
- Jimmy Williams, 43, American football player (San Francisco 49ers, Seattle Seahawks).
- Rod Zaine, 76, Canadian ice hockey player (Pittsburgh Penguins, Buffalo Sabres, Chicago Cougars).

=== 8 ===
- Shinzo Abe, 67, Japanese politician, prime minister (2006–2007, 2012–2020) and MP (since 1993), shot.
- Sharmili Ahmed, 75, Bangladeshi actress (Meherjaan), cancer.
- Marta Aura, 82, Mexican actress.
- Denis Brière, 76, Canadian forester and academic administrator.
- Robin Dalton, 101, Australian literary agent, film producer and memoirist.
- Athanasios Dimitrakopoulos, 86, Greek politician, MP (1981–1996).
- George Jonathan Dodo, 65, Nigerian Roman Catholic prelate, bishop of Zaria (since 2000).
- José Eduardo dos Santos, 79, Angolan politician, president (1979–2017), complications from cardiac arrest and COVID-19.
- Luis Echeverría, 100, Mexican politician, president (1970–1976) and secretary of the interior (1963–1969).
- Hugh Evans, 81, American Hall of Fame basketball referee (NBA).
- Fan Haifu, 88, Chinese crystallographer, member of the Chinese Academy of Sciences.
- Yvon Garlan, 88, French historian and academic.
- Beth Gott, 99, Australian plant physiologist.
- Michael Edward John Gore, 86, British diplomat, governor of the Cayman Islands (1992–1995).
- Gregory Itzin, 74, American actor (24, The Mentalist, Lincoln), complications from surgery.
- LeRoy Johnson, 85, American artist.
- Donna Jones, 83, American politician.
- Alam Khan, 78, Bangladeshi composer ("Ore Neel Doriya Amay De Re De Chhariya", "Hayre Manush Rangin Phanush").
- Angel Lagdameo, 81, Filipino Roman Catholic prelate, bishop of Dumaguete (1989–2000) and archbishop of Jaro (2000–2018).
- Andrew David McLachlan, 88, British chemist.
- Harry Mowbray, 75, Scottish footballer (Blackpool, Bolton Wanderers, Cowdenbeath).
- Richard Bruce Paris, 76, British mathematician.
- Bob Parsons, 72, American football player (Chicago Bears).
- Alan Pope, 76, Canadian politician, Ontario MPP (1977–1990), complications following heart surgery.
- Tony Sirico, 79, American actor (The Sopranos, Goodfellas, Wonder Wheel).
- Donnie "Beezer" Smith, 97, American child actor (Our Gang).
- Larry Storch, 99, American actor (F Troop, Tennessee Tuxedo and His Tales, The Great Race).

=== 9 ===
- Ljiljana Bakić, 82–83, Serbian architect.
- Andrew Cole, 61, Australian rugby union referee, cancer.
- Paul Dear, 55, Australian footballer (Hawthorn), pancreatic cancer.
- John Gwynne, 77, British darts commentator (Sky Sports), cancer.
- Ted Hunt, 102, British waterman, Queen's Bargemaster (1978–1990).
- Tommy Jacobs, 87, American golfer.
- L. Q. Jones, 94, American actor (The Wild Bunch, Hang 'Em High) and film director (A Boy and His Dog).
- Johnny Kay, 82, American guitarist (Bill Haley & His Comets).
- Matt King, 37, American visual artist, co-founder of Meow Wolf, suicide.
- Diarmuid McCarthy, 66, Irish Gaelic footballer (Naomh Abán, Muskerry).
- Jerry Millsapps, 88, American football coach.
- Notti Osama, 14, American rapper, stabbed.
- Wim Quist, 91, Dutch architect (Eindhoven Water Towers, Museon, Beelden aan Zee).
- Thomas Donald Ramsay, 82, American politician.
- Davie Robb, 74, Scottish footballer (Aberdeen, national team).
- Lily Safra, 87, Brazilian-Monegasque art collector and philanthropist.
- Alois Schätzle, 96, German politician, member of the Landtag of Baden-Württemberg (1971-1988).
- Ann Shulgin, 91, American writer (PiHKAL, TiHKAL).
- Adam Strachan, 35, Scottish footballer (Partick Thistle, Ross County, Clyde).
- B. K. Syngal, 82, Indian telecommunications executive.
- Barbara Thompson, 77, English jazz saxophonist (Colosseum, Manfred Mann's Earth Band, Keef Hartley Band), complications from Parkinson's disease.
- Bernard Toone, 65, American basketball player (Philadelphia 76ers, Latte Matese Caserta, Gaiteros del Zulia), cancer.
- András Törőcsik, 67, Hungarian footballer (Újpesti Dózsa, Montpellier, national team), pneumonia.
- Wanderley Vallim, 85, Brazilian entrepreneur and politician, governor of the Federal District (1990–1991).

=== 10 ===
- Theodore Aranda, 87, Belizean politician, MP (1979–1984, 1989–1993, 1998–2003).
- Ken Armstrong, 63, English footballer (Kilmarnock, Southampton, Birmingham City).
- Andrew Ball, 72, British pianist.
- Correlli Barnett, 95, English military historian.
- Michael Barratt, 94, English television presenter (Nationwide).
- Maurice Boucher, 69, Canadian biker (Hells Angels) and convicted murderer, throat cancer.
- Gil Burford, 98, American ice hockey player (Michigan Wolverines).
- Anvar Chingizoglu, 60, Azerbaijani historian and ethnologist.
- Cho Jung-hyun, 52, South Korean footballer (Yugong Elephants, Jeonnam Dragons, national team), pancreatic cancer.
- Francis X. Clines, 84, American journalist (The New York Times).
- Ermano Batista Filho, 84, Brazilian lawyer and politician, Minas Gerais MLA (1991–2007), traffic collision.
- Hans Frauenfelder, 99, Swiss-born American biophysicist.
- Hirohisa Fujii, 90, Japanese economist and politician, minister of finance (1993–1994, 2009–2010) and MP (1977–1986, 1990–2012).
- Chantal Gallia, 65, Algerian-born French singer and humorist, stroke.
- Noah Eli Gordon, 47, American poet.
- Enamul Haque, 85, Bangladeshi museologist.
- Warren Kitzmiller, 79, American politician, member of the Vermont House of Representatives (since 2001), complications from a stroke.
- Gerald McEntee, 87, American trade unionist, president of AFSCME (1981–2012).
- Noel McMahen, 95, Australian footballer (Melbourne).
- Bjørn Inge Mo, 54, Norwegian politician, member of the Sámi Parliament of Norway (2017–2020).
- Trevor Perrett, 80, Australian politician.
- Nelson Pinder, 89, American civil rights activist.
- Marcel Rémy, 99, Swiss mountaineer and rock climber.
- Juan Roca Brunet, 71, Cuban basketball player, Olympic bronze medalist (1972).
- Barry Sinclair, 85, New Zealand cricketer (Wellington, national team).
- Ján Solovič, 88, Slovak writer, playwright and politician, member of the Slovak National Council (1971–1990).
- Herman O. Thomson, 93, American lieutenant general.

=== 11 ===
- Víctor Benítez, 86, Peruvian footballer (Boca Juniors, Milan, national team).
- Shirley Cotton, 87, Australian Olympic discus thrower (1956).
- David Dalton, 80, British-born American author and editor (Rolling Stone).
- Natalya Donchenko, 89, Russian speed skater, Olympic silver medalist (1960).
- Jimmie Lou Fisher, 80, American politician, treasurer of Arkansas (1981–2003).
- Pat Courtney Gold, 83, American Wasco Native basket weaver, fiber artist and mathematician.
- José Guirao, 63, Spanish cultural manager and art expert, minister of culture (2018–2020), director of Reina Sofía Museum (1994–2001) and deputy (2019–2020), cancer.
- Erik Hornung, 89, Latvian-born German Egyptologist.
- Sean Kelly, 81, Canadian humorist and writer (National Lampoon, Heavy Metal), heart and renal failure.
- Diana Lebacs, 74, Curaçaoan writer, pancreatic cancer.
- Wolf Liebeschuetz, 95, German-born British historian.
- Terence Macartney-Filgate, 97, British-born Canadian film director (Fields of Endless Day, Dieppe 1942, Timothy Findley: Anatomy of a Writer) and cinematographer.
- Joseph Mittathany, 90, Indian Roman Catholic prelate, bishop of Tezpur (1969–1980) and archbishop of Imphal (1980–2006).
- Gary Moeller, 81, American football coach (Illinois Fighting Illini, Michigan Wolverines, Detroit Lions).
- Monty Norman, 94, English composer ("James Bond Theme").
- William F. Perrin, 83, American biologist.
- Judith Schiff, 84, American archivist.
- Ducky Schofield, 87, American baseball player (St. Louis Cardinals, Pittsburgh Pirates, San Francisco Giants).
- Dennis Waterman, 74, American poker player.
- Johannes Willms, 74, German historian and journalist (Süddeutsche Zeitung).

=== 12 ===
- Tony Binarelli, 81, Italian magician and television personality.
- Donald Card, 93, South African police officer and politician, mayor of East London.
- Francisco Contreras, 88, Mexican tennis player.
- Michael Cowan, 89, English cricketer (Yorkshire).
- John Elliott, 83, New Zealand politician, MP (1975–1981).
- Vicente Fialho, 84, Brazilian politician, deputy (1991–1995), COVID-19.
- Sir Michael Fowler, 92, New Zealand architect and politician, mayor of Wellington (1974–1983).
- Ivo Fürer, 92, Swiss Roman Catholic prelate, bishop of Saint Gallen (1995–2005), complications from Parkinson's disease.
- Bobby Hill, 100, American motorcycle racer.
- Séamus Hughes, 69, Irish judge and politician, TD (1992–1997).
- Shelby D. Hunt, 83, American organizational theorist.
- Avdhash Kaushal, 87, Indian social worker and academic.
- Ville Kurki, 54, Finnish Olympic sailor (1996).
- Philip Lieberman, 87, American cognitive scientist.
- Joan Lingard, 90, Scottish author (The Kevin and Sadie series).
- Colm McGurk, 55, Northern Irish hurler and Gaelic footballer (Lavey).
- Zahia Mentouri, 74–75, Algerian physician and government official, minister of health and social affairs (1992).
- Lekeaka Oliver, 53, Cameroonian separatist leader (Ambazonia Self-Defence Council), shot.
- T. R. Prasad, 80, Indian civil servant.
- Tõnu Saar, 77, Estonian actor (Inquest of Pilot Pirx, Metskannikesed, Curse of Snakes Valley).
- Chris Stuart, 73, British journalist (Western Mail), producer (Only Connect), and songwriter.
- Bramwell Tovey, 69, British conductor (Vancouver Symphony Orchestra, Rhode Island Philharmonic Orchestra) and composer (Eighteen), sarcoma.
- Gene Vuckovich, 86, American politician.
- Andrew Watson, 95, British Army officer, general officer commanding Eastern District (1977–1980).
- Natalie Wicken, 91, New Zealand netball player.
- Jan Wijn, 88, Dutch pianist and pedagogue.
- Dave Wintour, 77, British bass guitarist (The Wurzels) and session musician, cancer.
- Xu Xurong, 100, Chinese physicist, member of the Chinese Academy of Sciences.
- Christoph-Michael Zeisner, 78, German Olympic sport shooter (1972, 1976).

=== 13 ===
- Arturo Alessandri Besa, 98, Chilean politician, MP (1973, 1990–1998).
- Rashard Anderson, 45, American football player (Carolina Panthers), pancreatic cancer.
- Gaston Bouatchidzé, 86, Georgian-French writer and translator.
- Mario Chella, 88, Italian politician, deputy (1983–1987).
- Bruce Cliffe, 75, New Zealand politician, MP (1990–1996).
- A. B. Crentsil, 78, Ghanaian singer, composer and guitarist.
- Kerry J. Donley, 66, American politician, mayor of Alexandria, Virginia (1996–2003).
- Bobby East, 37, American racing driver (NASCAR Craftsman Truck Series), stabbed.
- Wajih Fanous, 74, Lebanese literary critic.
- Mark Fleischman, 82, American businessman (Studio 54), assisted suicide.
- John Froines, 83, American chemist and civil rights activist (Chicago Seven), complications from Parkinson's disease.
- Michael James Jackson, 77, American music producer (Kiss, L.A. Guns), complications from COVID-19 and pneumonia.
- Anna Jakubowska, 95, Polish World War II combatant and community activist.
- Tanveer Jamal, 62, Pakistani actor, television director and producer, cancer.
- Pat John, 69, Canadian actor (The Beachcombers).
- Sixtus Lanner, 88, Austrian politician, MP (1971–1996).
- Antti Litja, 84, Finnish actor (The Year of the Hare, The Clan – Tale of the Frogs, Farewell, Mr. President).
- Renee Magee, 63, American Olympic swimmer.
- James M. McCoy, 91, American USAF non-commissioned officer, chief master sergeant of the air force (1979–1981).
- Carlos Quintana, 71–72, Argentine trade unionist and politician, deputy (2005–2009).
- Rubina Qureshi, 81, Pakistani classical singer, cancer.
- Jim Schaaf, 84, American football executive.
- Reaner Shannon, 85, American medical technologist.
- Howard Slusher, 85, American attorney and sports agent.
- Colin Stubs, 81, Australian tennis player and promoter, pancreatic cancer.
- Charlotte Valandrey, 53, French actress (Red Kiss, In the Shadow of the Wind, Tomorrow Is Ours) and author, complications from heart surgery.
- Spencer Webb, 22, American college football player (Oregon Ducks), cliff diving accident.
- Dieter Wedel, 83, German television director (Hamburg Transit, Schwarz Rot Gold, Die Affäre Semmeling).

=== 14 ===
- Bobby Aylward, 67, Irish politician, TD (2007–2011, 2015–2020).
- Henry Carlson Jr., 97, American politician.
- Helen Rose Dawson, 94, American religious sister and college administrator, complications from a stroke.
- Christian Doermer, 87, German actor (No Shooting Time for Foxes, Oh! What a Lovely War) and director.
- Kazi Ebadul Haque, 86, Bangladeshi judge.
- Jürgen Heinsch, 82, German football player and coach, Olympic bronze medallist (1964).
- Jim Ivey, 97, American cartoonist, co-founder of OrlandoCon.
- Thomas H. Kapsalis, 97, American painter and sculptor.
- Jak Knight, 28, American comedian, television writer and actor (Big Mouth, Bust Down, Black-ish), suicide by gunshot.
- Nikolai Krogius, 91, Russian chess grandmaster.
- Germano Longo, 89, Italian actor (Guns of the Black Witch, The Revenge of Spartacus, Twenty Thousand Dollars for Seven).
- Abdul Azeez Madani, 72, Indian Islamic scholar.
- Kevin McMahon, 92, Australian footballer (North Melbourne).
- Tamara Metal, 88, Israeli Olympic high and long jumper (1952) and basketball player (national team).
- Sylvia Molloy, 83, Argentine writer.
- Francisco Morales Bermúdez, 100, Peruvian politician and general, president (1975–1980), prime minister (1975) and minister of economy (1968–1974).
- Abdullah Ommidvar, 89, Iranian-Chilean movie director and producer (Johnny 100 Pesos).
- Erica Pedretti, 92, Swiss artist.
- Ramai Ram, 78, Indian politician, Bihar MLA (1972–1977, 1980–2015).
- Eugenio Scalfari, 98, Italian journalist (L'Espresso), deputy (1968–1972) and co-founder of La Repubblica.
- Rita Seamon, 97, American bridge player.
- Viktor Slesarev, 72, Russian football player (SKA-Khabarovsk) and manager (Zvezda Perm, SOYUZ-Gazprom Izhevsk).
- Pleun Strik, 78, Dutch footballer (PSV Eindhoven, NEC Nijmegen, national team).
- Clem Tisdell, 82, Australian economist.
- Ann Trotter, 90, New Zealand historian.
- Ivana Trump, 73, Czech-American businesswoman, author, model and first wife of US president Donald Trump, fall.
- William Van der Pol, 84, Dutch-born Canadian Olympic water polo player (1972).
- Albert Vann, 87, American politician, member of the New York State Assembly (1975–2001) and New York City Council (2002–2013).
- Carleton Varney, 85, American interior designer.
- Jiří Večerek, 78, Czech Olympic footballer.
- Rolan Walton, 93, American baseball player and coach (Houston Cougars).

=== 15 ===
- Britt Arenander, 80, Swedish translator, writer and journalist.
- Raymond Audi, 89, Lebanese banker.
- Frans Baert, 96, Belgian lawyer and politician.
- José Ramón Balaguer, 90, Cuban politician, minister of health (2006–2010).
- Ellen Carlson, 93, American newspaper columnist (St. Paul Pioneer Press).
- Arthur Day, 88, Australian cricketer (Victoria).
- Francesco De Lucia, 88, Italian lawyer and politician, mayor of Bari (1981–1990).
- Terry Fulton, 92, Australian footballer (Geelong).
- Barry Goldstein, 69-70, American-born Australian geologist and civil servant.
- Bill Greensmith, 91, English cricketer (Essex).
- Lourdes Grobet, 81, Mexican photographer.
- Knut Korsæth, 90, Norwegian politician, county governor of Oppland (1981–2001) and sports official.
- Aleksandr Kozlov, 29, Russian footballer (Spartak Moscow, Ararat Yerevan), blood clot.
- Luiz of Orléans-Braganza, 84, Brazilian aristocrat, disputed head of the imperial family (since 1981).
- Meng Zhaozhen, 89, Chinese landscape architect, member of the Chinese Academy of Engineering.
- Patrick Michaels, 72, American climatologist and climate change denier.
- Alice Pauli, 100, Swiss gallery owner, sculptor and artist.
- Pratap Pothen, 70, Indian film director (Rithubhedam) and actor (Thakara, Chamaram).
- Paul Ryder, 58, English bassist (Happy Mondays), heart disease and diabetes.
- Adolf Stein, 91, German Olympic sailor (1956).
- Neil Vipond, 92, Canadian-American actor (Phobia, Kings and Desperate Men, Paradise) and stage director.
- Howard N. Watson, 93, American watercolor painter.
- Georgi Yartsev, 74, Russian football player (Spartak Moscow, Soviet Union national team) and manager.

=== 16 ===
- Ángela Abós Ballarín, 87, Spanish politician, member of Aragonese cortes (1991–1999).
- Georgs Andrejevs, 89, Latvian politician, minister of foreign affairs (1992–1994) and MEP (2004–2009).
- Elly Appel-Vessies, 69, Dutch tennis player.
- Brian Bailey, 89, English Olympic sport shooter (1972).
- Egil Bakke, 94, Norwegian civil servant, director of the Norwegian Competition Authority (1983–1995).
- Mary Ellin Barrett, 95, American writer.
- Ricky Bibey, 40, English rugby league player (Wigan Warriors, Leigh Centurions, Wakefield Trinity), heart attack.
- Hobie Billingsley, 94, American Hall of Fame diving coach (Indiana Hoosiers).
- Paul Cotton, 92, Australian diplomat and public servant.
- Francisco Cumplido, 91, Chilean lawyer and politician, minister of justice (1990–1994).
- Georgios Daskalakis, 86, Greek politician, MP (1981–1996, 2000–2004).
- Herbert W. Franke, 95, Austrian scientist and writer.
- José Guadalupe Galván Galindo, 80, Mexican Roman Catholic prelate, bishop of Ciudad Valles (1994–2000) and Torreón (2000–2017).
- Paul Hannam, 50, Canadian Olympic sailor (1996).
- Dee Hock, 93, American businessman, founder of Visa Inc.
- Nirmal Singh Kahlon, 79, Indian politician, Punjab MLA (2007–2012).
- Ken Kennedy, 81, Irish rugby union player (London Irish, British & Irish Lions).
- Joseph A. Munitiz, 91, Welsh priest and academic.
- Mark Nye, 76, American politician, member of the Idaho House of Representatives (2014–2016) and Senate (since 2016).
- Carlos Pérez de Bricio, 94, Spanish businessman and politician, minister of industry (1975–1977).
- Idris Phillips, 64, American musician and composer.
- Sean Quilty, 56, Australian Olympic runner (1996), cancer.
- Silvio Quintero, 72, Spanish Olympic footballer.
- Mickey Rooney Jr., 77, American actor (Hot Rods to Hell, Honeysuckle Rose).
- Gerald Shargel, 77, American attorney, complications from Alzheimer's disease.
- John Soares Jr., 80, American racing driver, sepsis.
- Pauline Stansfield, 82, New Zealand disability rights advocate.
- Don Talbot, 88, Australian author.
- José Manuel Vela Bargues, 60, Spanish economist and politician, Valencian minister of finance (2011–2012).
- Vira Vovk, 96, Ukrainian-born Brazilian writer, critic and translator.
- Wakanohana Kanji II, 69, Japanese sumo wrestler and yokozuna, lung cancer.
- Brad White, 63, American football player (Tampa Bay Buccaneers, Indianapolis Colts, Minnesota Vikings).

=== 17 ===
- Enam Ali, 61, Bangladeshi-born British businessman, founder of The British Curry Awards and Spice Business Magazine, cancer.
- Ada Ameh, 48, Nigerian actress (Phone Swap, Òlòtūré, The Johnsons).
- Billy Davies, 86, Welsh cricketer (Glamorgan).
- Jessie Duarte, 68, South African politician, cancer.
- Herbert S. Eleuterio, 94, American industrial chemist.
- Eric Flint, 75, American author (1632) and editor.
- Phillip Geissler, 48, American physical chemist.
- Ilona Graenitz, 79, Austrian politician, MP (1986–1995) and MEP (1995–1999).
- Watson Khupe, 59, Zimbabwean politician, senator (2018–2022), complications from muscular dystrophy.
- Kim Chong-kon, 91, South Korean admiral and diplomat, chief of naval operations (1979–1981) and ambassador to Taiwan (1981–1985).
- Erden Kıral, 80, Turkish film director and screenwriter (On Fertile Lands, Hunting Time, The Blue Exile), intracranial bleed.
- Joyce Laing, 83, Scottish art therapist.
- David Moberg, 78, American journalist, complications from Parkinson's disease.
- Kemi Nelson, 66, Nigerian politician.
- César Pedroso, 75, Cuban pianist (Los Van Van, Pupy y Los que Son, Son).
- Jack Reid, 79, American politician, member of the Virginia House of Delegates (1990–2008).
- Francesco Rizzo, 79, Italian footballer (Cagliari, Fiorentina, national team).
- Richard D. Simons, 95, American politician.
- Héctor Tricoche, 66, Puerto Rican salsa singer-songwriter.
- Yang Fujia, 86, Chinese nuclear physicist, president of Fudan University (1993–1998) and chancellor of the University of Nottingham (2001–2013).

=== 18 ===
- Xavier Amorós Solà, 99, Spanish writer and poet, senator (1986–1993).
- Maya Attoun, 48, Israeli visual artist, complications from surgery.
- Rebecca Balding, 73, American actress (Soap, Charmed, Makin' It), ovarian cancer.
- Booker Brown, 69, American football player (San Diego Chargers).
- Egidio Caporello, 91, Italian Roman Catholic prelate, bishop of Mantua (1986–2007).
- Ottavio Cinquanta, 83, Italian sports administrator, president of the ISU (1994–2016) and member of the IOC (1996–2008).
- Dani, 77, French actress (Day for Night, Love on the Run, Guy) and singer.
- Vincent DeRosa, 101, American hornist.
- José Diéguez Reboredo, 88, Spanish Roman Catholic prelate, bishop of Osma-Soria (1984–1987), Ourense (1987–1996) and Tui-Vigo (1996–2010), stroke.
- Povl Dissing, 84, Danish singer and guitarist.
- Delia Giovanola, 96, Argentine human rights activist, co-founder of the Grandmothers of the Plaza de Mayo.
- Anastasia Golovashkina, 28, Russian-American political consultant, glioblastoma.
- Bajram Haliti, 67, Serbian Romani author.
- Hans-Joachim Hespos, 84, German composer.
- Renate Holmes, 92, German-British Olympic alpine skier.
- Sanoussi Jackou, 82, Nigerien politician.
- Larry Jeffrey, 81, Canadian ice hockey player (Detroit Red Wings, Toronto Maple Leafs, New York Rangers).
- Anwar Hussain Laskar, 58, Indian politician, Assam MLA (1996–2006).
- Don Mattera, 86, South African poet and writer.
- Raja Mukherjee, 71, Indian cricketer (Bengal).
- Claes Oldenburg, 93, Swedish-born American sculptor.
- Tony Ongarello, 89, Australian footballer (Fitzroy).
- Françoise Riopelle, 95, Canadian choreographer.
- Aloyzas Sakalas, 91, Lithuanian politician, MP (1990–2004), MEP (2004–2009) and signatory of the Act of the Re-Establishment of the State of Lithuania.
- Bhupinder Singh, 82, Indian ghazal singer, COVID-19 and colorectal cancer.
- Nikola Štedul, 84, Croatian independence activist and assassination target.
- Murray Wall, 76, Australian jazz double bassist.
- Jane Woods, 75, American politician, member of the Virginia House of Delegates (1988–1992) and Senate (1992–2000).

=== 19 ===
- Stuart Chapman, 71, English footballer (Port Vale, Stafford Rangers, Macclesfield Town).
- Tommy Collins, Irish filmmaker (Kings, The Gift, Penance), cancer. (death announced on this date)
- Vicky Conway, 42, Irish academic and police reform activist.
- Jim Dillard, 83, American gridiron football player (Calgary Stampeders, Ottawa Rough Riders, Toronto Argonauts).
- Pearl Duncan, 89, Australian anthropologist and academic.
- Eunice Durham, 90, Brazilian anthropologist.
- Maxime Feri Farzaneh, 93, French-Iranian writer and filmmaker.
- Steve Gibbons, 72, Australian politician, MP (1998–2013).
- Versand Hakobyan, 71, Armenian oligarch and politician, MP (2007–2012).
- Michael Henderson, 71, American bass guitarist (Miles Davis) and vocalist, cancer.
- Henkie, 76, Dutch singer.
- Angela Jacobs, 53, American journalist and anchor (WFTV), breast cancer.
- Charles Johnson, 50, American football player (Pittsburgh Steelers, Philadelphia Eagles, New England Patriots), suicide by drug overdose.
- Nigel Konstam, 89, British sculptor and art historian.
- Joan F. López Casasnovas, 69, Spanish Catalan language philologist, teacher and politician, member of the Balearic parliament (1983–1992).
- Igor López de Munain, 38, Spanish politician, member of the Basque parliament (2012–2016).
- George McGrath, 79, Irish jockey.
- Ajay Kumar Parida, 58, Indian biologist, cardiac arrest.
- Jack Parry, 90, English footballer (Derby County).
- Ruslana Pysanka, 56, Ukrainian actress (Moskal-Charivnyk, With Fire and Sword, Rzhevsky Versus Napoleon) and cinematographer, cancer.
- Q Lazzarus, 61, American singer ("Goodbye Horses").
- William Richert, 79, American filmmaker (Winter Kills) and actor (My Own Private Idaho, The Client).
- Charles Rizza, 92, British consultant physician.
- Kevin Rooney, 71, American comedian, television writer and producer (My Wife and Kids, Politically Incorrect, 'Til Death), complications from diabetes and renal failure.
- Richard Seal, 86, English organist and conductor.
- Allen Spraggett, 90, Canadian paranormal writer and broadcaster.
- Vincent Tonucci, 72, American politician.
- Charles L. Waddell, 90, American politician, member of the Senate of Virginia (1972–1998).
- Jerry Zaleski, 89, American football player (Hamilton Tiger-Cats).

=== 20 ===
- Barbara Breit, 84, American tennis player.
- Lieselotte Breker, 62, German Olympic sport shooter.
- Bill Burbach, 74, American baseball player (New York Yankees).
- Rex Crawford, 90, American-born Canadian politician, MP (1988–1997).
- Barry Downs, 92, Canadian architect.
- Sir Kenneth Eaton, 87, British admiral, controller of the Navy (1989–1994).
- Alan Grant, 73, Scottish comic book writer (Judge Dredd, Lobo, Batman).
- Alice Harnoncourt, 91, Austrian violinist (Concentus Musicus Wien).
- Peter Inge, Baron Inge, 86, British military officer, chief of the general staff (1992–1994), chief of the defence staff (1994–1997) and constable of the Tower (1996–2001).
- Phil Jackson, 90, English rugby league player (Barrow Raiders, Great Britain, national team).
- Henry Janzen, 82, Canadian football player (Winnipeg Blue Bombers) and coach (Manitoba).
- Alan M. Kent, 55, English writer (Surfing Tommies).
- Kamoya Kimeu, 83–84, Kenyan paleontologist and curator, kidney failure.
- Jolán Kleiber-Kontsek, 82, Hungarian discus thrower, Olympic bronze medalist (1968).
- Bernard Labourdette, 75, French road racing cyclist.
- Hank Lehvonen, 71, Canadian ice hockey player (Kansas City Scouts).
- Douglas Mitchell, 83, Canadian football player (BC Lions) and CFL commissioner (1984–1988).
- Stephen Milosz, 66, Australian cricketer (Western Australia, Tasmania).
- Stephen G. Olmstead, 92, American lieutenant general.
- Luis Omedes, 84, Spanish Olympic rower (1952) and luger (1968).
- Miguel Pérez Villar, 77, Spanish politician, senator (1991–1993).
- Judith Stamm, 88, Swiss politician, member (1983–1999) and president (1996–1997) of the National Council.
- Viktor Žmegač, 93, Croatian musicologist and scholar.

=== 21 ===
- An An, 35, Chinese-born giant panda, euthanised.
- Zvonko Bezjak, 87, Croatian hammer thrower.
- Taurean Blacque, 82, American actor (Hill Street Blues, DeepStar Six, Savannah).
- Marcus Blunt, 75, British composer.
- Shlomo Carlebach, 96, German-born American Haredi rabbi and scholar.
- William A. Collins, 87, American politician.
- Justin Crawford, 45, Australian footballer (Sydney Swans, Hawthorn).
- Marjorie Crocombe, 92, Cook Islands author and academic.
- Milan Dvořák, 87, Czech footballer (Spartak Praha Stalingrad, Dukla Prague, Czechoslovakia national team).
- Johnny Egan, 83, American basketball player (Detroit Pistons, Baltimore Bullets) and coach (Houston Rockets), fall.
- Mary Fields Hall, 88, American rear admiral.
- Paddy Hopkirk, 89, British rally driver.
- Martti Lehtevä, 91, Finnish Olympic boxer (1960).
- Jim Lynch, 76, American Hall of Fame football player (Notre Dame Fighting Irish, Kansas City Chiefs), Super Bowl champion (IV).
- Gustavo López Davidson, 60–61, Salvadoran politician and businessman, leader of the Nationalist Republican Alliance (2019–2020).
- Reino Paasilinna, 82, Finnish politician, MEP (1996–2009), complications from Parkinson's disease.
- Vytautas Paukštė, 90, Lithuanian actor (Northern Crusades, ...And Other Officials, Rafferty).
- Nikola Radmanović, 53, Serbian footballer (Red Star Belgrade, Mérida).
- Perry Rubenstein, 68, American gallerist.
- Daniel B. Ruggles III, 97, American politician.
- Jörg Schmidt, 61, German sprint canoeist, Olympic silver medalist (1988).
- Michel Schneider, 78, French writer and musicologist.
- Uwe Seeler, 85, German footballer (Hamburger SV, West Germany national team).
- Luca Serianni, 74, Italian linguist, traffic collision.
- Rodney Stark, 88, American religious sociologist and author (The Rise of Christianity, The Rise of Mormonism).

=== 22 ===
- Robert Boutigny, 94, French sprint canoeist, Olympic bronze medalist (1948).
- Ken Brown, 73, Canadian ice hockey player (Chicago Blackhawks).
- Emilie Benes Brzezinski, 90, Swiss-American sculptor.
- Kieran Crotty, 91, Irish politician, TD (1969–1989).
- Frankie Davidson, 88, Australian singer.
- Núria Feliu, 80, Spanish singer and actress, complications from a stroke.
- Heikki Haavisto, 86, Finnish politician, minister for foreign affairs (1993–1995).
- Joseph Hazelwood, 75, American sailor (Exxon Valdez), complications of cancer and COVID-19. (death announced on this date)
- Ryoichi Honda, 82, Japanese politician, member of the House of Councillors (1998–2004).
- Arnold E. Kempe, 95, American politician, member of the Minnesota House of Representatives (1975–1978).
- Nanda Khare, 75, Indian writer.
- Peter Lübeke, 69, German footballer (Hamburger SV, 1. FC Saarbrücken).
- Fazle Rabbi Miah, 76, Bangladeshi politician.
- David Moores, 76, British football executive, chairman of Liverpool (1991–2007).
- Kenichi Ōkuma, 57, Japanese video game music composer (Langrisser V: The End of Legend, Super Smash Bros. Brawl), esophageal cancer.
- Maria Petri, 82, English football supporter.
- Leon E. Rosenberg, 89, American geneticist, physician and educator, dean of the Yale School of Medicine (1984–1991).
- Dwight Smith, 58, American baseball player (Chicago Cubs, Atlanta Braves), World Series champion (1995), heart and lung failure.
- Stefan Soltész, 73, Hungarian-Austrian conductor.
- Jaroslav Starosta, 85, Czech Olympic rower.
- Kurt vid Stein, 86, Danish Olympic cyclist (1960, 1964).
- Nelson Stevens, 84, American artist.
- Aleksey Vdovin, 59, Russian-Moldovan water polo player, Olympic bronze medalist (1992).
- Stuart Woods, 84, American author (Chiefs, Run Before the Wind, New York Dead).

=== 23 ===
- Boy Alano, 81, Filipino actor (Sa Bilis Walang Kaparis, James Batman, Juan & Ted: Wanted).
- Venant Bacinoni, 82, Burundian Roman Catholic prelate, bishop of Bururi (2007–2020).
- Jered Barclay, 91, American actor (War of the Satellites, The Transformers, Tuff Turf).
- Christian Beauvalet, 92, French Olympic pentathlete.
- Peter Boyle, 71, Scottish epidemiologist.
- Con Britt, 74, Australian footballer (Collingwood).
- Paul Coker, 93, American illustrator (Mad) and animation production designer (Frosty the Snowman, Santa Claus Is Comin' to Town).
- Ronald S. Dancer, 73, American politician, member of the New Jersey General Assembly (since 2002).
- Robert Dutton, 71, American politician, member of the California State Assembly (2002–2004) and Senate (2004–2012), cancer.
- Rinus Ferdinandusse, 90, Dutch writer and journalist.
- Katie Gallagher, 35, American fashion designer, drugged.
- Don Gehrmann, 94, American Olympic runner (1948).
- Durval Guimarães, 87, Brazilian Olympic sport shooter.
- Diane Hegarty, 80, American satanist, co-founder of the Church of Satan.
- Jerry Holan, 91, American Olympic swimmer (1952).
- Vitalii Huliaiev, 44, Ukrainian military officer, airstrike.
- Sid Jacobson, 92, American comic book writer (Richie Rich, Casper the Friendly Ghost, Hot Stuff the Little Devil), stroke complications from COVID-19.
- Kyaw Min Yu, 53, Burmese writer and political activist, execution by hanging.
- Aaron Latham, 78, American journalist and screenwriter (Urban Cowboy, Perfect, The Program).
- Gerald Nagler, 92, Swedish businessman and human rights activist.
- Nguyễn Xuân Vinh, 92, Vietnamese aerospace engineer and military officer, commander of the South Vietnam Air Force (1958–1962).
- Mike Pela, 72, British record producer and mixing engineer, Grammy winner (2002).
- Billy Picken, 66, Australian footballer (Collingwood, Sydney Swans).
- Bob Rafelson, 89, American film director (Five Easy Pieces, The Postman Always Rings Twice) and television producer (The Monkees).
- Bhisadej Rajani, 100, Thai royal.
- Robin Reed, 65, American cell biologist.
- Gloria Stoll Karn, 98, American pulp cover artist and illustrator.
- Julio Valdez, 66, Dominican baseball player (Boston Red Sox).
- Phyo Zeya Thaw, 41, Burmese politician and rapper, MP (2012–2016, 2016–2021), execution by hanging.

=== 24 ===
- Janina Altman, 91, Polish-Israeli chemist and Holocaust survivor.
- Kevin Beahan, 89, Irish Gaelic footballer (St Mary's).
- Steve Beaird, 70, American-born Canadian football player (Winnipeg Blue Bombers).
- Carla Cassola, 74, Italian actress (Captain America, Where Are You? I'm Here, The Butterfly's Dream) and composer.
- Thomas C. Creighton, 77, American politician, member of the Pennsylvania House of Representatives (2001–2013).
- Joseph Dan, 87, Israeli scholar of Jewish mysticism.
- Alain David, 90, Luxembourgish-born French Olympic sprinter (1956).
- Tamar Eshel, 102, British-born Israeli politician, MK (1977–1984).
- Tim Giago, 88, American journalist (Indian Country Today, Rapid City Journal) and founder of the Native American Journalists Association.
- Charles Godfrey, 104, American-born Canadian physician and politician, Ontario MPP (1975–1977).
- Neil Hague, 72, English footballer (Rotherham United, Plymouth Argyle, AFC Bournemouth).
- Lotte Ingrisch, 92, Austrian author.
- Diana Kennedy, 99, British food writer (The Cuisines of Mexico).
- Michael R. Long, 82, American politician, member of the New York City Council (1981–1983).
- Sam McCrory, 57, Northern Irish loyalist (Ulster Defence Association) and convicted paramilitary, fall.
- Chase Mishkin, 85, American theatre producer (Memphis).
- Len Oliver, 88, American soccer player (Uhrik Truckers, Ludlow Lusitano, Baltimore Pompei), complications from a stroke.
- Kurt Pfammatter, 81, Swiss Olympic ice hockey player (1964).
- Charlotte Pomerantz, 92, American author.
- Win Remmerswaal, 68, Dutch baseball player (Boston Red Sox).
- Berta Riaza, 94, Spanish actress (Ten Ready Rifles, Entre Tinieblas).
- Mncedisi Shabangu, 53, South African actor (Hijack Stories, Catch a Fire, Vaya), playwright and theatre director.
- Peter Vilandos, 82, Greek-American poker player.
- David Warner, 80, English actor (The Omen, Tron, Titanic), Emmy winner (1981), complications from lung cancer.
- McKinley Washington Jr., 85, American politician, member of the South Carolina House of Representatives (1975–1990) and Senate (1990–2000).
- Sir William Wright, 94, Northern Irish bus manufacturer (Wrightbus) and politician, member of the constitutional convention (1975–1976).

=== 25 ===
- Jennifer Bartlett, 81, American visual artist.
- John Bienenstock, 85, Hungarian-born Canadian physician.
- Geir Børresen, 79, Norwegian actor (Sesam Stasjon).
- John Duggan, 93, English rugby union (Wakefield) and league (Wakefield Trinity) player.
- Clive Holmes, 78, English historian.
- Martin How, 90, English composer and organist.
- Irina Ionesco, 91, French photographer.
- Ashok Jagdale, 76, Indian cricketer (Madhya Pradesh).
- Syed Hamid Ali Shah Moosavi, 82, Pakistani Islamic scholar.
- Tatyana Moskvina, 63, Russian columnist, writer, and actress (His Wife's Diary, Gisele's Mania).
- Bridget Namiotka, 32, American pairs skater.
- Marit Paulsen, 82, Norwegian-born Swedish journalist and politician, MEP (1999–2004, 2009–2014).
- Hartmut Perschau, 80, German politician and soldier, MEP (1989–1991).
- Tom Poberezny, 75, American Hall of Fame aerobatic pilot.
- Sandy Roberton, 80, British record producer (Hark! The Village Wait, Please to See the King, Ten Man Mop, or Mr. Reservoir Butler Rides Again).
- Herb Roedel, 83, American football player (Oakland Raiders).
- Yoko Shimada, 69, Japanese actress (Shōgun, Castle of Sand, Kaze, Slow Down), colorectal cancer.
- Knuts Skujenieks, 85, Latvian writer and poet.
- Song Zhaosu, 81, Chinese politician, governor of Gansu (1999–2001).
- Paul Sorvino, 83, American actor (Goodfellas, The Rocketeer, Law & Order).
- Milenko Stefanović, 92, Serbian classical and jazz clarinetist.
- Richard Tait, 58, Scottish-born American board game designer (Cranium), complications from COVID-19.
- Lucio Tasca, 82, Italian winemaker and Olympic equestrian (1960).
- David Trimble, Baron Trimble, 77, Northern Irish politician, first minister (1998–2002), MP (1990–2005) and member of the House of Lords (since 2006), Nobel Prize laureate (1998).
- Bruce Williams, 83, Australian footballer (Carlton).

=== 26 ===
- Mandy Adamson, 50, South African professional golfer, cancer.
- Inger Alfvén, 82, Swedish author and sociologist.
- Ronald Allison, 90, British journalist and press secretary (Queen Elizabeth II).
- Sushovan Banerjee, 84, Indian physician, West Bengal MLA (1984–1989), kidney disease.
- Jannette Burr, 95, American Olympic alpine skier (1952).
- Daniel Cardon de Lichtbuer, 91, Belgian banker, president of Bank Brussels Lambert (1992–1996).
- Clive Coates, 80, British wine writer.
- Iosif Culineac, 80, Romanian Olympic water polo player (1964, 1972).
- Branko Cvejić, 75, Serbian actor (Grlom u jagode, The Elusive Summer of '68, Balkan Express).
- Eli N. Evans, 85, American author, complications from COVID-19.
- Terry Forcum, 80, American professional golfer.
- Bruno Foresti, 99, Italian Roman Catholic prelate, archbishop of Modena-Nonantola (1976–1983) and archbishop ad personam of Brescia (1983–1998).
- Anne-Marie Garat, 75, French novelist, cancer.
- Paul Garon, 80, American writer and blues historian.
- Darío Gómez, 71, Colombian singer.
- David Ireland, 94, Australian author (The Unknown Industrial Prisoner).
- Sy Johnson, 92, American jazz composer, arranger and pianist, COVID-19.
- Tomohiro Katō, 39, Japanese mass murderer (Akihabara massacre), execution by hanging.
- Chin Kung, 95, Chinese Buddhist monk, pneumonia.
- Oleksandr Kukurba, 27, Ukrainian military officer.
- James Lovelock, 103, English environmentalist (Gaia hypothesis), inventor of the electron capture detector, complications from a fall.
- Lukas Lundin, 64, Swedish-Canadian mining industry executive, chairman of Lundin Mining (2006–2022), brain cancer.
- Abbas Ali Mandal, Bangladeshi politician, MP (1986–1988).
- Lael Morgan, 86, American author, journalist and historian.
- Alfred Moses, 45, Canadian politician, Northwest Territories MLA (2011–2019).
- Anthony Oettinger, 93, German-born American linguist and computer scientist.
- Giorgio Oppi, 82, Italian politician, deputy (2006–2009).
- Uri Orlev, 91, Polish-born Israeli children's author (The Island on Bird Street) and translator.
- Aldo Pastore, 91, Italian politician, deputy (1979–1987).
- William Phillips, 78, Australian Olympic water polo player (1964).
- J. Deotis Roberts, 95, American theologian.
- Balwinder Safri, 63, Indian singer.
- Laurie Sawle, 96, Australian cricket player (Western Australia) and selector.
- Felix Thijssen, 88, Dutch author.
- Nick Tredennick, 75, American inventor, ATV accident.
- Inez Voyce, 97, American baseball player (South Bend Blue Sox, Grand Rapids Chicks).
- Jean Westwood, 91, British-Canadian figure skater, cancer.

=== 27 ===
- Luis Aguiar, 82, Uruguayan Olympic rower.
- Mary Alice, 85, American actress (Fences, A Different World, The Matrix Revolutions), Tony winner (1987).
- Paul Émile Joseph Bertrand, 97, French Roman Catholic prelate, auxiliary bishop of Lyon (1975–1989) and bishop of Mende (1989–2001).
- Luis Morgan Casey, 87, American Roman Catholic prelate, auxiliary bishop of La Paz (1983–1988) and apostolic vicar of Pando (1988–2013).
- Bernard Cribbins, 93, English actor (The Wombles, Doctor Who) and singer ("The Hole in the Ground").
- Yelizaveta Dementyeva, 94, Russian sprint canoer, Olympic champion (1956).
- Tony Dow, 77, American actor (Leave It to Beaver, Never Too Young) and television director (Coach), complications from liver cancer.
- John Gayler, 79, Australian politician, MP (1983–1993).
- John Grenell, 78, New Zealand country singer.
- Dieter Helm, 81, German farmer and politician, MP (1990) and MdL (1990–2009).
- Dorothy Hollingsworth, 101, American educator.
- JayDaYoungan, 24, American rapper, shot.
- Larry Josephson, 83, American radio host (WBAI), programmer, and engineer, complications from Parkinson's disease.
- Inez Kingi, 91, New Zealand health advocate.
- Ardhendu Kumar Dey, 81, Indian politician, Assam MLA (1991–2006).
- Gisèle Lalonde, 89, Canadian politician, mayor of Vanier, Ontario (1985–1992).
- Marie McDemmond, 76, American academic administrator.
- Burt Metcalfe, 87, Canadian-born American actor (Father of the Bride, Gidget) and television producer (M*A*S*H).
- Sir Christopher Meyer, 78, British diplomat, Downing Street press secretary (1993–1996), ambassador to the United States (1997–2003) and Germany (1997), stroke.
- Mick Moloney, 77, Irish-American musician and folklorist.
- Joseph F. Murphy Jr., 78, American judge, Maryland Court of Appeals (2007–2011).
- Pak To-chun, 78, North Korean politician.
- Les Rothman, 95, American basketball player (Chicago American Gears, Syracuse Nationals).
- Celina Seghi, 102, Italian Olympic alpine skier (1948, 1952).
- Ron Sider, 82, Canadian-born American theologian and social activist, heart attack.
- Peter Smith, 96, British Olympic field hockey player.
- Tom Springfield, 88, English musician (The Springfields) and songwriter ("I'll Never Find Another You", "Georgy Girl").
- Harvey D. Tallackson, 97, American politician, member of the North Dakota Senate (1977–2008).
- Abdullahi Ali Ahmed Waafow, Somali general and politician, MP and mayor of Merca.
- Edwin Wilson, 79, Australian poet.

=== 28 ===
- Leslie Bernstein, 82, American cancer epidemiologist and biostatistician.
- Pauline Bewick, 86, English-born Irish artist, cancer.
- Franco Casalini, 70, Italian basketball coach (Olimpia Milano).
- Leontien Ceulemans, 70, Dutch actress and television presenter, complications following a fall.
- Pietro Citati, 92, Italian writer and literary critic.
- Chris Cord, 82, American racing driver and investment banker.
- Jason Di Tullio, 38, Canadian soccer player (Montreal Impact) and manager, brain cancer.
- Clay Hart, 86, American country singer.
- Wayne Hawkins, 84, American football player (Oakland Raiders).
- Gil Hayes, 82, Canadian wrestler (All-Star Wrestling, Stampede Wrestling).
- Yaakov Heruti, 95, Israeli political activist and convicted terrorist, founder of the Kingdom of Israel.
- İlhan İrem, 67, Turkish singer and songwriter, kidney failure.
- József Kardos, 62, Hungarian footballer (Újpesti Dózsa, national team).
- George A. Kennedy, 93, American classicist.
- Rodney Melland, 84, American curler (1971 world championship bronze medalist).
- Terry Neill, 80, Northern Irish football player (national team) and manager (Arsenal, Tottenham Hotspur).
- Walter D. Reed, 98, American Air Force major general.
- Howard Rosenthal, 83, American political scientist.
- Roger H. Stuewer, 87, American historian.
- Péter Szőke, 74, Hungarian tennis player, complications from a stroke.
- Jim Trelease, 81, American author, complications from Parkinson's disease.
- William White, 56, American football player (Detroit Lions, Kansas City Chiefs, Atlanta Falcons), complications from amyotrophic lateral sclerosis.

=== 29 ===
- Hans Bangerter, 98, Swiss football administrator, general secretary of UEFA (1960–1989).
- Sybille Benning, 61, German politician, MP (2013–2021).
- Jean Bobet, 92, French road bicycle racer.
- Geoffrey Brennan, 77, Australian philosopher, leukemia.
- Myra Butter, 97, English aristocrat.
- Phil Carlson, 70, Australian cricketer (Queensland, national team).
- Jerome Ceppos, 75, American journalist and newspaper editor, sepsis.
- Emmie Chanika, 66, Malawian human rights activist, stroke.
- Rasik Dave, 65, Indian actor (Eeshwar, Masoom, Straight), kidney failure.
- Margot Eskens, 82, German Schlager singer.
- Juris Hartmanis, 94, Latvian-American computer scientist.
- Mamoun Hassan, 84, Saudi-born British screenwriter (The Good Life, Machuca), director and producer (No Surrender).
- Knud J. V. Jespersen, 80, Danish historian.
- Olga Kachura, 52, Ukrainian pro-Russian separatist, missile strike.
- Yuri Kobishchanov, 87, Russian Africanist and sociologist.
- Lee Seng Tee, 99, Singaporean businessman and philanthropist.
- Susan M. Levin, 50, American dietitian.
- Christopher Loder, 3rd Baron Wakehurst, 96, British hereditary peer, member of the House of Lords (1970–1999).
- John Mackin, 78, Scottish football player (Northampton Town, York City, Corby Town) and manager.
- Arthur Malcolm, 87, Australian Anglican prelate.
- Clarence E. McKnight Jr., 92, American lieutenant general.
- Julian Nava, 95, American educator and diplomat, ambassador to Mexico (1980–1981).
- Mary Obering, 85, American painter.
- Alika Ogorchukwu, 38, Nigerian street vendor and Italian murder victim, hit to death.
- Michael Redfern, 79, British actor (The Newcomers, United!, The Two Ronnies).
- Tom Richmond, 72, American cinematographer (Stand and Deliver, House of 1000 Corpses, Nick & Norah's Infinite Playlist).
- Samuel Sandoval, 98, American Navajo code talker.
- Adrian Thorne, 84, English footballer (Brighton & Hove Albion, Plymouth Argyle, Exeter City).
- James D. Whitmire, 87, American politician.
- Zhang Xingqian, 100, Chinese metal physicist, member of the Chinese Academy of Sciences.

=== 30 ===
  - Odis Allison, 72, American basketball player (Golden State Warriors).
- George Bartenieff, 89, German-American actor (Hercules in New York, See No Evil, Hear No Evil, Cookie).
- Pat Carroll, 95, American actress (The Little Mermaid, The Danny Thomas Show, Caesar's Hour), Emmy winner (1957), complications from pneumonia.
- Anne Eisenhower, 73, American interior designer.
- Mike Filey, 80, Canadian historian and radio host.
- Don Hammond, 85, New Zealand rugby league player (Auckland, national team).
- Robert I. Jewett, 84, American mathematician.
- Mike Johnson, 78, American politician, member of the Oklahoma Senate (1998–2010), complications from hip surgery.
- Johnny Kieper, 90, American racing driver and team owner.
- Kiyoshi Kobayashi, 89, Japanese voice actor (Humanoid Monster Bem, Lupin the Third, Death Note), pneumonia.
- Martin Luluga, 89, Ugandan Roman Catholic prelate, auxiliary bishop (1986–1990) and bishop (1990–1999) of Gulu and bishop of Nebbi (1999–2011).
- Honorata Marcińczak, 92, Polish Olympic gymnast.
- Sadanand Mohol, 83, Indian cricketer (Maharashtra, West Zone, Indian Starlets), cardiac arrest.
- Nichelle Nichols, 89, American actress (Star Trek, Truck Turner, Snow Dogs), heart failure.
- Roberto Nobile, 74, Italian actor (La scuola, Everybody's Fine, First Light of Dawn).
- John Rensenbrink, 93, American political activist, founder of Maine Green Independent Party.
- Archie Roach, 66, Australian musician and singer-songwriter ("Took the Children Away").
- Yitzchok Tuvia Weiss, 95, Slovak-born British-Israeli Haredi rabbi, head of the Edah HaChareidis (since 2004).
- Alvin Yeo, 60, Singaporean politician, MP (2006–2015), cancer.

=== 31 ===
- Vadim Bakatin, 84, Russian politician and intelligence officer, minister of internal affairs (1988–1990) and chairman of the KGB (1991).
- David Cannan, 85, Manx politician, MHK (1982–2011).
- Carole Caroompas, 76, American painter, complications from Alzheimer's disease.
- Vasile Silvian Ciupercă, 73, Romanian politician, deputy (2000–2004).
- Hubert Coppenrath, 91, French Polynesian Roman Catholic prelate, coadjutor archbishop (1997–1999) and archbishop (1999–2011) of Papeete.
- Terry Davies, 88, Australian Olympic rower (1960, 1964).
- Mónica Domínguez Blanco, 38, Spanish journalist, cancer.
- Joseph A. Doorley Jr., 91, American politician, mayor of Providence, Rhode Island (1965–1975).
- Anneli Drummond-Hay, 84, Scottish show jumper.
- Jack Fellure, 90, American perennial political candidate.
- Maria Frisé, 96, German journalist and author.
- Cécile Gallez, 86, French politician, deputy (2002–2010) and mayor of Saint-Saulve (1977–2020).
- Zulma Gómez, 61, Paraguayan politician, senator (since 2008) and deputy (2003–2008), drowned.
- A. Jean de Grandpré, 100, Canadian lawyer and businessman, chancellor of McGill University (1984–1991).
- Diane Haigh, 73, British architect.
- Hartmut Heidemann, 81, German footballer (MSV Duisburg, West Germany national team).
- Herb Henderson, 91, Australian footballer (Footscray).
- Norman Herbert, 88, English rugby footballer.
- Abdul Lateef A. Hussein, 75, Nigerian physicist and academic administrator, vice chancellor of Lagos State University (2005–2011).
- Khalid Ibrahim, 75, Malaysian politician, menteri besar of Selangor (2008–2014), MP (2008–2018) and Selangor MLA (2008–2018).
- Christophe Izard, 85, French television producer (L'île aux Enfants, Albert the Fifth Musketeer).
- Charles L. Keyser, 92, American Episcopalian bishop.
- Hubertus Leteng, 63, Indonesian Roman Catholic prelate, bishop of Ruteng (2009–2017), heart attack.
- Stanley B. Lippman, 72, American computer scientist and author.
- Nirmala Mishra, 83, Indian playback singer (Malajahna, Adina Megha), heart attack.
- Brian Molloy, 91, New Zealand plant ecologist, conservationist, and rugby union player (Manawatu, Canterbury, national team).
- Ian Nish, 96, British academic.
- Mo Ostin, 95, American Hall of Fame record executive (Warner Bros. Records, Reprise Records, Verve Records).
- T. Mohandas Pai, 89, Indian business executive and philanthropist, founder of Udayavani.
- Fidel V. Ramos, 94, Filipino military officer and politician, president (1992–1998), secretary of national defense (1988–1991) and chief of the staff (1984–1988), COVID-19.
- Brajagopal Roy, 86, Indian politician, Tripura MLA (1978–1983, 1993–1998).
- Bill Russell, 88, American Hall of Fame basketball player and coach (Boston Celtics, Seattle SuperSonics, Sacramento Kings), Olympic champion (1956).
- Valero Serer, 89, Spanish footballer (Mestalla, Zaragoza, Gimnàstic).
- Sara Shane, 94, American actress (The King and Four Queens, Tarzan's Greatest Adventure, 'Magnificent Obsession').
- Frederick L. Stackable, 86, American politician, member of the Michigan House of Representatives (1971–1974).
- John Steiner, 81, English actor (Hine, Violent Rome, Yor, the Hunter from the Future), traffic collision.
- Iimura Takahiko, 85, Japanese filmmaker and fine artist.
- Oleksiy Vadaturskyi, 74, Ukrainian entrepreneur, founder of Nibulon, shelling.
- Ayman al-Zawahiri, 71, Egyptian Islamic militant, emir of the Egyptian Islamic Jihad (1991–1998), emir (since 2011) and deputy emir (1988–2011) of al-Qaeda, airstrike.
