= List of people from Toowoomba =

This is a list of notable people from the Australian regional city of Toowoomba, Queensland.

== General ==
- Dallas Angguish (author and academic)
- Douglas Annand (designer)
- Don Bennett (1930s long-distance pilot, WWII leader of Atlantic Ferry Command and the RAF "Pathfinders")
- Leonard John Brass (botanist)
- Graham S. Burstow (photographer)
- Phil Cass (comedy entertainer and magician)
- Harry Chauvel (first Australian soldier to attain the rank of lieutenant general, Australian Imperial Force)
- Don Featherstone (filmmaker)
- Frank Forde (politician, 15th prime minister of Australia)
- Gina Jeffreys (country singer)
- Sidney Jeffryes (radio operator, Australasian Antarctic Expedition 1911–1914)
- Sonia Kruger (Big Brother Australia presenter, 2012–present)
- Meshel Laurie (TV personality)
- Ian Leslie (TV personality)
- Archie Moore (artist)
- Frank Riethmuller (German-Australian rose breeder)
- Steele Rudd (Arthur Hoey Davis) (author best known for On Our Selection)
- Don Talbot (historical author, mainly of local and Queensland histories)
- Kosta Theodosis (musician)
- Penelope Wensley (diplomat and governor of Queensland)

== Acting ==
- Jason Gann (actor, known for playing Wilfred in the Australian TV show of the same name)
- Judy Morris (actress, film director, screenwriter: Happy Feet and Babe)
- Geoffrey Rush (Academy Award-winning actor)
- Shane Withington (actor)

== Science ==
- Peter Cameron (mathematician)
- Craig Hawker (polymer chemist and materials scientist)
- Elizabeth Kenny (pioneer in polio treatment and physiotherapy)
- Cheryl Praeger (mathematician)
- Don Syme (designer and creator of the F Sharp programming language)

== Sports ==
- Peter Bol (South Sudanese Australian Olympian)
- Michael Brennan (hockey player)
- Adam Brideson (veague player)
- Will Brown (motor racing driver)
- Sandy Campbell (rugby league player)
- Ross Case (former tennis player)
- Tim Cuddihy (Olympic archer)
- John Dorge (former National Basketball League player)
- Suzie Faulkner (hockey player)
- Nathan Friend (rugby league player)
- Jared Graves (Olympic BMX rider)
- Natalie Grinham and Rachael Grinham (top women's world squash ranking)
- Rhonda Thorne (1981 Women's World Open Squash champion)
- Eric Harris (rugby league footballer of the 1920s and 1930s for Western Suburbs and Leeds)
- Tim Horan (rugby union player)
- Brad Howard (Australian rules football player)
- Nikki Hudson (hockey player)
- Geraint Jones (English cricketer)
- Michael Katsidis (professional boxer)
- Jason Little (rugby union player)
- Martin Love (Australian cricketer)
- Alexander Mayes (cricketer)
- Paul McCabe (rugby league player)
- Fabian "Fabe" McCarthy (rugby union player)
- John McDonald (rugby league player and administrator)
- Phil Morwood (rugby league player)
- Hope Munro (hockey player)
- Glynis Nunn (heptathlete)
- Robbie O'Davis (rugby league player)
- Cory Paix (rugby league player)
- Nick Paterson (rugby league player)
- Will Power (racing driver, 2014 and 2022 IndyCar Series champion, 2018 Indianapolis 500 winner)
- Steve Price (rugby league player)
- Karla Reuter (former Olympian; Australian representative for women's soccer)
- John Rillie (basketball player and coach)
- Greg Ritchie (former Queensland and Australian cricketer)
- Samson Ryan (AFL player)
- Chloe Sims (gymnast)
- Angie Skirving (hockey player)
- Karen Smith (hockey player)
- Tyson Smoothy (rugby league player)
- Peter Sterling (rugby league player)
- Ash Taylor (rugby league player)
- Johnathan Thurston (rugby league player)
- Patrick Tiernan (distance runner)
- Ben Walker (rugby league player)
- Shane Webcke (rugby league player)
- Jack Wildermuth (cricket player)
- Michael Witt (rugby league player)
