= General Thompson =

General Thompson may refer to:

- Charles F. Thompson (1882–1954), U.S. Army major general
- David D. Thompson (born 1963), U.S. Space Force general
- Edmund R. Thompson (1930–2019), U.S. Army major general
- Geoffrey Thompson (British Army officer) (1905–1983), British Army lieutenant general
- James E. Thompson Jr. (1935–2017), U.S. Army lieutenant general
- John F. Thompson (general) (fl. 1980s–2020s), U.S. Air Force lieutenant general
- John T. Thompson (1860–1940), U.S. Army brigadier general
- Julian Thompson (Royal Marines officer) (born 1934), Royal Marines major general
- M. Jeff Thompson (1826–1876), Missouri State Guard brigadier general
- Michael C. Thompson (fl. 1980s–2020s), Oklahoma Army National Guard major general
- Richard Horner Thompson (1926–2016), U.S. Army general
- Thomas Perronet Thompson (1783–1869), British Army major general
- Tracy A. Thompson (fl. 1980s–2020s), U.S. Army Reserve major general
- Waddy Thompson Jr. (1798–1868), South Carolina Militia brigadier general
- William Thompson (Iowa politician) (1813–1897), Iowa Volunteer Cavalry brevet brigadier general
- William Thompson (general) (1736–1781), Continental Army brigadier general

== See also ==
- General Thomson (disambiguation)
- Attorney General Thompson (disambiguation)
