= General Thomson =

General Thomson may refer to:

- Herman O. Thomson (born 1929), U.S. Air Force lieutenant general
- James Noel Thomson (1888–1979), British Army general
- Mowbray Thomson (1832–1917), British East India Company general
- Robert Thomson (British Army officer) (fl. 1980s–2020s), British Army major general
- William Montgomerie Thomson (1877–1963), British Army lieutenant general

== See also ==
- General Thompson (disambiguation)
