= Senator Carlson (disambiguation) =

Frank Carlson (1893–1987) was a U.S. Senator from Kansas from 1950 to 1969. Senator Carlson may also refer to:

- Don Carlson (politician) (born 1938), Washington State Senate
- Henry Carlson Jr. (1925–2022), South Dakota State Senate
- Jim Carlson (Minnesota politician) (born 1947), Minnesota State Senate
- John Carlson (Minnesota politician) (born 1953), Minnesota State Senate
- Martin R. Carlson (1877–1971), Illinois State Senate
- Tom Carlson (born 1941), Nebraska State Senate
