= Yvon Garlan =

French historian and academic (1933–2022)

- Born: 16 July 1933
- Died: 8 July 2022 (aged 88)
- Education: École normale supérieure
- Occupations: Historian, professor

Yvon Garlan (16 July 1933 – 8 July 2022) was a French historian and academic. He specialized in classical antiquity.

== Biography ==
Born in 1933, Garlan studied at the École normale supérieure and earned an agrégation in history. A specialist in the Hellenistic period, he was a professor at Rennes 2 University. His research led to the expansion of knowledge on Ancient Greek slavery, the Greek wars, and the amphora stamp. His studies on the stamp systems of Thasos, Sinope, and Heraclea Pontica were highly notable.

In February 1979, Garlan was one of 34 signatories of a declaration written by Léon Poliakov Pierre Vidal-Naquet to dismantle the historical negationism of Robert Faurisson. In 1991, he became a correspondent of the Académie des Inscriptions et Belles-Lettres.

Yvon Garlan died on 8 July 2022 at the age of 88.

== Publications ==
- La Guerre dans l'Antiquité (1972)
- Recherches de poliorcétique grecque (1974)
- Les Révoltes bretonnes de 1675 (1975)
- Les Esclaves en Grèce ancienne (1982)
- Vin et amphores de Thasos (1988)
- Guerre et économie en Grèce ancienne (1989)
- Pleumeur-Bodou : chronique d'une commune trégorroise entre l'Ancien régime et la révolution spatiale (1994)
- Les Timbres amphoriques de Thasos (1999)
- Les Timbres céramiques sinopéens sur amphores et sur tuiles trouvés à Sinope (2004)
