= Andrew David McLachlan =

British scientist (1935–2022)

Andrew David McLachlan FRS (25 January 1935 – 8 July 2022) was a British scientist who worked in the areas of theoretical chemistry and molecular biology.

McLachlan studied mathematics at Cambridge before moving in to theoretical chemistry where his research was concerned with electron spin. Following time at Cambridge and Caltech, he made the move in to molecular biology at the MRC LMB in 1967. There he initially worked with Max Perutz on haemoglobin, before moving on to studying the sequence and structure of other protein types (such as muscle protein tropomyosin). He retired in 2006.

McLachlan was elected Fellow of the Royal Society in 1989.
