= Carla Bazzanella =

Italian linguist (1947–2022)

- Born: 6 August 1947; Turin, Italy
- Died: 1 July 2022 (aged 74)
- Education: University of Turin
- Scientific career
- Fields: Cognitive linguistics, cognitive science, pragmatics
- Workplaces: University of Turin

Carla Bazzanella (6 August 1947 – 1 July 2022) was an Italian linguist.

Bazzanella was born in Turin. After graduating in classics from the University of Turin in 1971, Carla Bazzanella became a lecturer and researcher at the University of Pavia. She held this post from 1976 to 1983. After that she moved back to Turin, and taught glottology and philosophy of language until 1998. Since 2001, she had been an associate professor of linguistics at the University of Turin, where she taught both general linguistics and cognitive linguistics. She retired in 2012, but was active in the academic debate.

Bazzanella was a contributor to Journal of Pragmatics, Pragmatics and Cognition, and Language Sciences. She was also a member of the Società di Linguistica Italiana, the Associazione Italiana di Scienze Cognitive, and the International Pragmatics Association.

== Biography ==
After graduating in Classical Literature from the University of Turin, she was a tenured teacher in schools in the Piedmontese capital, then a contract researcher at the University of Pavia from 1976 to 1983. Returning to the University of Turin, she taught first Historical linguistics, then Philosophy of language. From 2001, as an associate professor of General Linguistics, she taught Linguistics in the three-year degree program and in the master's degree program; subsequently, she also taught Cognitive linguistics in the master's degree program. She retired in November 2012.

He collaborated with scientific journals such as Journal of Pragmatics, Pragmatics and Cognition, Language Sciences, Paradigmi, Lexia, and Language and Society.

He was a member of, among others, the Italian Linguistics Society, the Interdepartmental Center for Advanced Studies in Neuroscience, the Italian Association of Cognitive Sciences, and the International Pragmatics Association.

== Death ==
She died on 1 July 2022, at the age of 74.

== Bibliography ==
- C. Bazzanella, La sociolinguistica in classe. Problemi e ricerche nella scuola media dell'obbligo, Rome, Bulzoni, 1980
- C. Bazzanella, Le facce del parlare. Un approccio pragmatico all'italiano parlato, Florence, La Nuova Italia, 1994
- C. Bazzanella, I segnali discorsivi, in Grande grammatica italiana di consultazione, a cura di L. Renzi, G. Salvi, A. Cardinaletti, Bologna, il Mulino, 1995
- Repetition in Dialogue, edited by C. Bazzanella, Tübingen, Niemeyer, 1996
- C. Bazzanella, Intrecci lingua e scienze, in I modi di fare scienze, edited by F. Alfieri, M. Arcà, P. Guidoni, Turin, Bollati Boringhieri, 2000
- Passioni, emozioni, affetti, edited by C. Bazzanella, P. Kobau, Milan, McGraw e Hill, 2002
- Gender and New Literacy: A Multilingual Analysis, edited by E. Thüne, S. Leonardi, C. Bazzanella, London, Continuum, 2006
- C. Bazzanella, Linguistica e pragmatica del linguaggio. Un'introduzione, Rome-Bari, Laterza, 2008
- C. Bazzanella, L'approccio cognitivo alla metafora nel linguaggio giuridico, in Fondamenti cognitivi del diritto, edited by C. Raffaele, Milan, Bruno Mondadori, 2008
