= Gloria Stoll Karn =

American painter (1923–2022)

- Born: Gloria Maria Stoll; November 13, 1923; Bronx, New York, U.S.
- Died: July 23, 2022 (aged 98)
- Known for: Illustration of pulp magazines
- Spouse: Fred Karn (m. 1948)
- Website: gloriastollkarn.com

Gloria Maria Stoll Karn (November 13, 1923 – July 23, 2022) was an American artist who specialized in graphic art that was published in pulp magazines. She graduated from New York's High School of Music and Art in 1941.

Her work is contained in private collections and in the permanent collections of the Speed Art Museum, Brooklyn Museum of Art, the Pittsburgh Public School, Yale, and the Carnegie Museum of Art.

== Early life and education ==
Born in the Bronx, New York to Charles and Anne (Finamore) Stoll, both artists, Stoll Karn's earliest lessons were from her father who worked as both an illustrator and designer. Karn then went on to graduate from New York's High School of Music and Art in 1941; however, after the death of her father in 1941 Stoll Karn began working at the New York Life Insurance Company in an effort to support her family. Soon after that Karn's artwork was discovered by her building's janitor, and she was introduced to Rafael DeSoto, another resident of her building and an artist who illustrated pulp magazines.

Karn began working as a freelance pulp artist for Popular Publications which was one of the largest publishers of pulp magazines at the time.

== Career ==
Stoll Karn is acknowledged for her work in the Pulp Fiction Industry during the 1940s. Karn was one of the few female illustrators working in this field at the time. Karn published over 100 full color covers in pulp magazines during her career. She often drew pictures of young couples or brave soldiers and cowboys or grizzled detectives and criminals, as was popular and pulp magazines and movies in the 1940s. Karn's figures were extremely expressive; she created colorful and clearly delineated art that stood out on newsstands. Karn exhibited an immense range in her work, and was able to specialize in both the romance and mystery genre, something unique to pulp artists at the time.

In 1948 Gloria Stoll Karn married Fred Karn, a chemist, and moved to Pittsburgh, Pennsylvania. Although Stoll Karn attempted to continue her work, she found that shipping her painted canvases to her publishers in New York was too challenging an undertaking. Karn went on to raise three children, all while continuing to create artworks. She began creating paintings of religious subjects, as well as abstract painting, and in the seventy years she lived in Pittsburgh her art was displayed in venues such as Carnegie Museum of Art, the Hoyt Art Center, as well as local churches. Although Karn stopped creating pul illustrations, she began attending classes at Carnegie Mellon University, and taught collage and painting classes at the Community College of Allegheny County, The Sweetwater Center for the Arts, and the North Hills Art Center.

Although the popularity of pulp magazines has declined immensely, beginning in the 1940s due to wartime paper shortages and ultimately ending in the 1950s because of the rise in television as a growing use of leisure time Stoll Karn's work has in many ways outlived the genre itself. In 2018, Karn's work was showcased in a solo exhibition at the Norman Rockwell Museum, titled Gloria Stoll Karn: Pulp Romance.

Stoll Karn participated in an exhibition at The American Jewish Museum, Squirrel Hill.

Stoll Karn was Guest of Honor at PulpFest 2017, near her hometown of Pittsburgh. She died on July 23, 2022, at the age of 98.
