= Giorgio Oppi =

Italian politician (1940–2022)

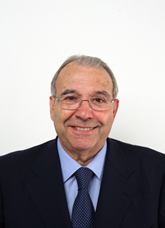
- Oppi in 2008

Member of the Chamber of Deputies of Italy
- In office 2000s – 12 May 2009

Personal details
- Born: 8 February 1940 Iglesias, Sardinia, Italy
- Died: 26 July 2022 (aged 82) Cagliari, Sardinia, Italy
- Political party: Christian Democracy; Christian Democratic Centre; Union of the Centre

Giorgio Oppi (8 February 1940 – 26 July 2022) was an Italian politician. He served as a member of the Chamber of Deputies of Italy until 12 May 2009. Oppi died in July 2022, at the age of 82.
