= Attorney General Thompson =

Attorney General Thompson may refer to:

- George Thompson (Wisconsin politician) (1918–1982), Attorney General of Wisconsin
- John Malbon Thompson (1830–1908), Attorney-General of Queensland
- John Sparrow David Thompson (1845–1894), Attorney General of Canada
- William T. Thompson (Nebraska politician) (1860–1939), Attorney General of Nebraska

== See also ==
- Vernon Wallace Thomson (1905–1988), Attorney General of Wisconsin
