= Walter Goldbeck =

German politician (1945–2022)

Member of the Landtag of Mecklenburg-Vorpommern
- In office 1990–1994

Personal details
- Born: 12 February 1945 Pirow, Brandenburg, Prussia, Germany
- Died: 2 July 2022 (aged 77)
- Party: FDP
- Education: University of Erfurt
- Occupation: Teacher, politician

Walter Goldbeck (12 February 1945 – 2 July 2022) was a German politician. A member of the Free Democratic Party, he served in the Landtag of Mecklenburg-Vorpommern from 1990 to 1994.

Goldbeck died in July 2022 at the age of 77.
