= Vicky Conway =

Irish academic and activist (1980–2022)

- Born: 6 May 1980; Douglas, Cork, Ireland
- Died: 19 July 2022 (aged 42)

Academic background
- Education: University College Cork; University of Edinburgh; Queen's University Belfast
- Doctoral advisor: Phil Scraton

Vicky Conway (6 May 1980 – 19 July 2022) was an Irish academic and activist for police reform. She was an associate professor at Dublin City University. She was a member of the board of the Policing Authority and the Commission on the Future of Policing.

== Early life ==
Conway was born on 6 May 1980, the fourth of five children of Rory Conway, a solicitor, and Jean Conway. She grew up in Douglas, Cork, where she attended Eglantine Primary School, Scoil Bhríde, and Regina Mundi College. She completed a bachelors of civil law degree in 2001 and a masters of law degree in 2002 at University College Cork. She was auditor of the law society and editor in chief of the Cork Online Law Review. She received a masters of science degree in criminology from the University of Edinburgh in 2003 and then studied for her Ph.D. at Queen's University Belfast (QUB) between 2003 and 2008. Her doctoral supervisor was Phil Scraton.

== Academic career ==
Conway worked as a teaching fellow at the University of Leeds and as a law lecturer at the University of Limerick between 2007 and 2009. She spent the next two years lecturing at QUB, where she also completed a postgraduate certificate in higher education teaching. She worked as a senior law lecturer at the University of Kent between 2011 and 2015, when she joined Dublin City University. She worked as a lecturer before being promoted to associate professor in 2017. She was the first convenor of equality, diversity and inclusion for the department. Conway was a visiting scholar in the United States and Australia.

Her first book, The Blue Wall of Silence: The Morris Tribunal and Police Accountability in Ireland, was published by the Irish Academic Press in 2010. It was based on her Ph.D. thesis to consider the results of the Morris Tribunal. She published Policing Twentieth Century Ireland: A History of An Garda Síochána in 2013. She was a member of the Northern/Irish Feminist Judgments project to re-write judgments with a feminist perspective, through which she wrote a review of the Kerry Babies Tribunal report.

She was a member of the board of the Policing Authority between January 2016 and 2017, when she served on the Commission on the Future of Policing between May 2017 and September 2018, before being re-appointed to the board in 2018 until December 2020. Conway was a member of the Group of States against Corruption, the Council of Europe's anti-corruption monitoring body. She gave evidence at Oireachtas committees throughout her career and gave evidence in November 2020 before the House of Lords subcommittee on European security and justice on the topic of police partnership in Ireland post-Brexit. She worked with fellow professor Yvonne Daly between 2015 and 2017 to train a hundred criminal defence solicitors following a 2014 change in law which allowed solicitors to be present at their clients' interviews with police.

Conway wrote a paper for the journal of the Royal Irish Academy in March 2022, where she considered how policing would be structured in a United Ireland. She organised a conference with the Garda Inspectorate, the Policing Authority, non-governmental organisations and academics to discuss police custody in June 2022. Shortly before her death, she was commissioned by the Policing Authority to research the experiences in the policing system of people of African and Brazilian descent, alongside the Irish Network Against Racism.

She was a member of Lawyers for Choice and supported the repeal of the Eighth Amendment during the 2018 Abortion Referendum. She hosted a podcast, Policed in Ireland, beginning in 2020 where she interviewed members of marginalised groups about their interactions with the police.

== Death ==
Conway died unexpectedly on 19 July 2022, at the age of 42.

== Works ==
- Vicky Conway (2013) Policing Twentieth Century Ireland: A History of an Garda Síochána. Oxon: Routledge.
- Vicky Conway, Yvonne Daly, Jennifer Schweppe (2010) Irish Criminal Justice: Theory, Process and Procedure. Dublin: Clarus Press.
- Vicky Conway (2010) The Blue Wall of Silence: The Morris Tribunal and Police Accountability in the Republic of Ireland. Dublin: Irish Academic Press.
