= Francis X. Clines =

American journalist and author (1938–2022)

Francis X. Clines (February 7, 1938 – July 10, 2022) was an American journalist and author. He worked for The New York Times for his entire career, from 1958 to 2017. Clines worked in the Times' Moscow bureau from 1989 to 1992.

== Books ==
- About New York: Sketches of the City (McGraw-Hill, 1979)
