= Clément Fayat =

French entrepreneur (1931/1932 – 2022)

- Born: 1931/1932; France
- Died: 3 July 2022 (aged 90)
- Occupation: Businessman
- Known for: Founder and owner, Fayat Group
- Children: 2 sons

Clément Fayat (1931/32 – 3 July 2022) was a French billionaire entrepreneur, who founded Fayat Group at the age of 25. At his death, his net worth was estimated at US$1.2 billion.

Fayat was the son of a bricklayer, and left school at 15 to become a construction apprentice. He founded the civil engineering company Fayat Group when he was 25, and it is now France's largest privately held construction and civil engineering company, with more than 21,000 staff in 170 countries.

Fayat was married and lived in Saint-Émilion, France. He had two sons, Jean-Claude et Laurent. In 2020, together with his sons, he created the Fayat Foundation.

Fayat died in July 2022, at the age of 90.
