= Xavier Amorós Solà =

Catalan politician and writer (1923–2022)

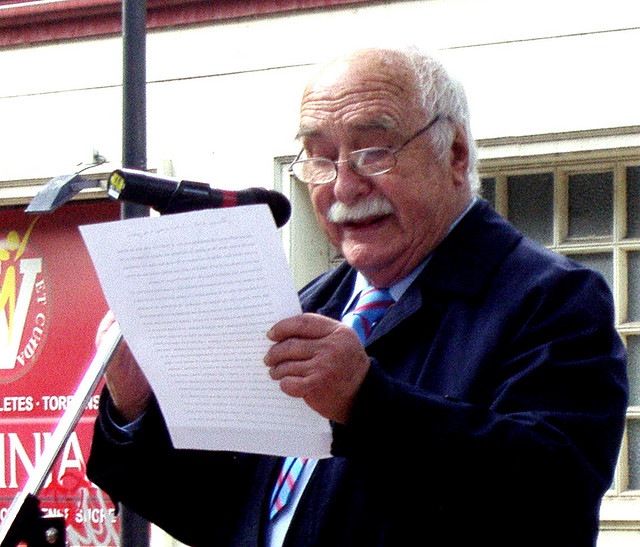
- Solà in 2008

Member of the Senate of Spain
- In office 1986–1992

Personal details
- Born: 7 April 1923 Reus, Spain
- Died: 18 July 2022 (aged 99) Reus, Spain
- Party: Socialists' Party of Catalonia
- Awards: Creu de Sant Jordi (2004)

Xavier Amorós i Solà (7 April 1923 – 18 July 2022) was a Catalan politician, poet, and writer. He served as a member of the Senate of Spain from 1986 to 1992. Solà died in July 2022 in Reus, at the age of 99.
