= Raymond Shamberger =

American biochemist (1934–2022)

- Born: 23 August 1934; Munising, Michigan
- Died: 2 July 2022 (aged 87); Kirtland, Ohio
- Occupation: Biochemist

Raymond J. Shamberger (23 August 1934 – 2 July 2022) was an American biochemist and cancer researcher.

Shamberger joined the Cleveland Clinic Foundation in 1969 and was head of the Clinic's enzymology section. He was director of King James Medical Laboratory. Shamberger became a member of the American Institute for Cancer Research in 1972. He originated the hypothesis that selenium may protect against cancer and correlated selenium levels in crops with cancer mortality.

In 1987, Shamberger was accused of plagiarizing a 1982 National Academy of Sciences report for his 1984 book Nutrition and Cancer. He resigned from his position at the Cleveland Clinic Foundation on June 30. Plenum Press withdrew the book from publication.

His 1983 book Biochemistry of Selenium was positively reviewed in academic journals.

== Selected publications ==
- Possible Protective Effect of Selenium Against Human Cancer (1969)
- Selenium in the Environment (1981)
- Biochemistry of Selenium (1983)
- Nutrition and Cancer (1984)
- Chemoprevention of Cancer (1986)
- Selenium and Cancer (1990)
