= Miguel Pérez Villar =

Spanish businessman and politician (1945–2022)

Member of the Senate of Spain
- In office 1991–1993

Personal details
- Born: 6 September 1945 Toro, Zamora, Spain
- Died: 20 July 2022 (aged 76) Madrid, Spain
- Party: People's Party
- Occupation: Businessman, politician

Miguel Pérez Villar (6 September 1945 – 20 July 2022) was a Spanish businessman and politician. A member of the People's Party, he served in the Senate of Spain from 1991 to 1993.

Villar died on 20 July 2022 in Madrid, at the age of 76.
