= Charles Rizza =

British consultant physician (1930–2022)

FRCPEd Charles Rocco Carmine Rizza
- Born: 1930
- Died: 19 July 2022 (aged 92); Oxfordshire, U.S.

Charles Rocco Carmine Rizza FRCPEd (1930 – 19 July 2022) was a British consultant physician who specialised in haematology.

== Biography ==
Rizza graduated with an MD from the University of St Andrews in 1962, and was awarded the university's gold medal for his thesis Conditions affecting the level of antihaemophilic globulin (factor VIII) in the blood.

Between 1958 and 1961, Rizza held the post of Medical Research Council Clinical Research Fellow at the Blood Coagulation Research Unit in Oxford.

At the Oxford Haemophilia Centre, he was consultant physician from 1966 to 1993, and director from 1977 to 1993.

Rizza was also clinical lecturer in haemophilia at the University of Oxford from 1967 to 1993, and he chaired the United Kingdom Haemophilia Centre Directors Organization from 1987 to 1990.

Rizza was named in documents submitted to the Penrose Inquiry, the Scottish Public Inquiry into Hepatitis C/HIV acquired infection from NHS treatment in Scotland with blood and blood products.

In 2017 Rizza was criticised for his role in the Contaminated Blood Scandal in documents which appeared to advocate viral infectivity trials in humans rather than chimps. The documents were cited by Andy Burnham in the House of Commons.

Rizza died on 19 July 2022, at the age of 92.
