= Joan F. López Casasnovas =

Spanish politician (1952–2022)

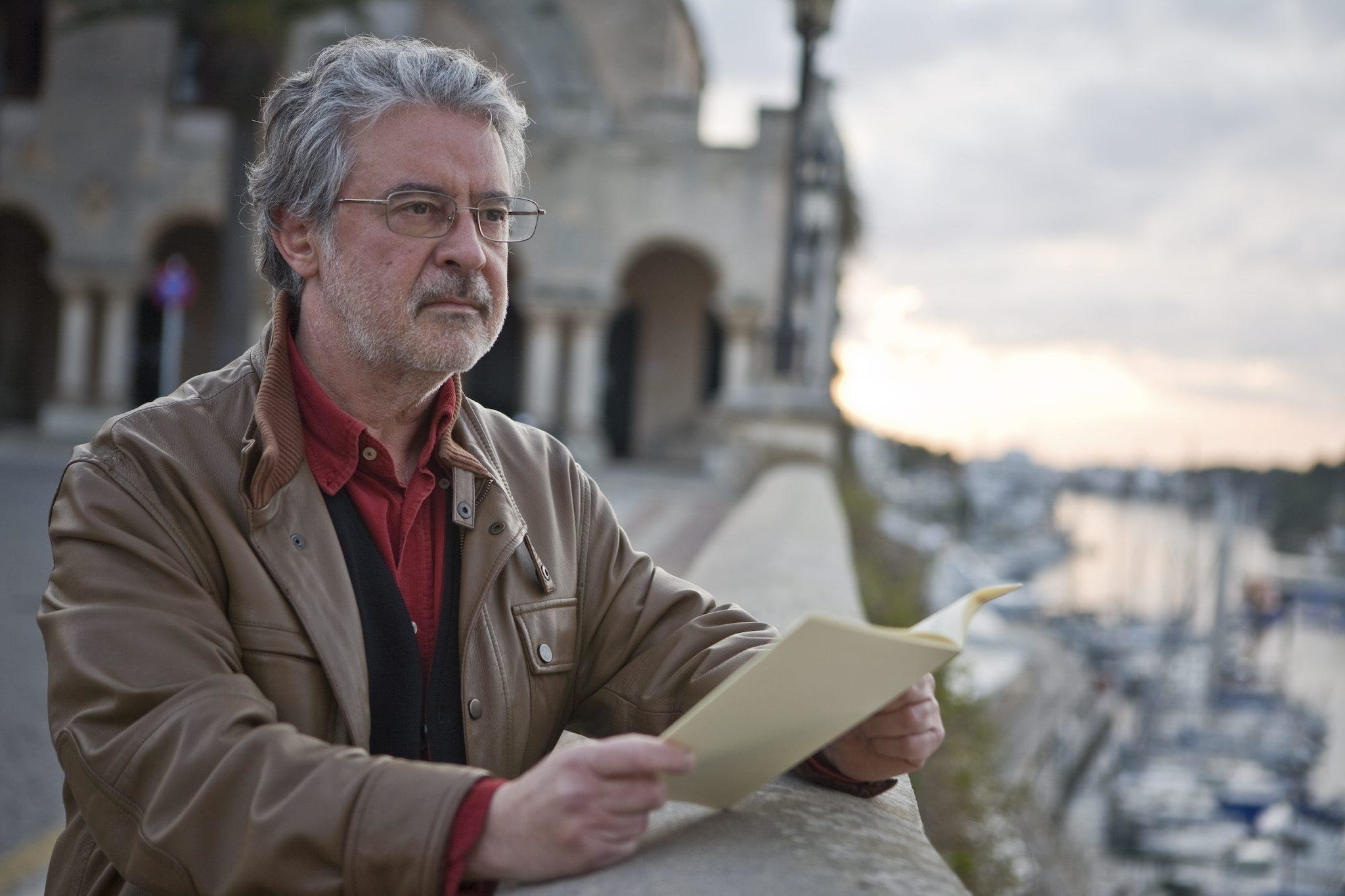
Joan Lopez

Joan Francesc López Casasnovas (13 August 1952 – 19 July 2022) was a Spanish Catalan language philologist, teacher, and politician. He was a member of the Balearic parliament from 1983 to 1992.
