= George Jonathan Dodo =

Nigerian Roman Catholic prelate (1956–2022)

His Excellency George Jonathan Dodo
- Bishop of Zaria
- Archdiocese: Kaduna
- Diocese: Zaria
- Appointed: 5 December 2000
- Term ended: 8 July 2022
- Predecessor: Post created

Orders
- Ordination: 18 June 1983
- Consecration: 3 March 2001 by Osvaldo Padilla

Personal details
- Born: 17 August 1956 Zuturung Mago, Nigeria
- Died: 8 July 2022 (aged 65)

George Jonathan Dodo (17 August 1956 – 8 July 2022) was a Nigerian Roman Catholic prelate.

Born in Nigeria, Dodo was ordained to the priesthood in 1983. He served as the bishop of the Roman Catholic Diocese of Zaria, Nigeria, from 2000 until his death in 2022.

He was described as a modest and courageous leader by Catholic Charity Aid to the Church in Need, after his death.

Catholic Church titles
Preceded by Post created	Bishop of Zaria; 2000–2022	Succeeded by Sede vacante
