= Kemi Nelson =

Nigerian politician (1956–2022)

Executive Director, Nigerian Insurance Trust Fund (NSTIF)
- In office 2019–2022
- Appointed by: Muhammadu Buhari

Commissioner for Women Affairs and Poverty Alleviation
- In office 1999–2003
- Appointed by: Bola Tinubu

Personal details
- Born: Olukemi Nelson; 9 February 1956
- Died: 17 July 2022 (aged 66)
- Party: All Progressives Congress
- Spouse: Adeyemi Nelson
- Children: 3
- Education: University College Hospital, Ibadan; Lagos State University

Olukemi "Kemi" Nelson (9 February 1956 – 17 July 2022) was a Nigerian politician and socialite. She was the Executive Director of the Nigerian Insurance Social Trust Fund (NSTIF).

== Early life and education ==
Nelson was born in Lagos on 9 February 1956 and attended Anglican Girls Grammar School, Ijebu-Ode for her secondary education. For her tertiary education, she attended school of Nursing in the University College Hospital Ibadan where she qualified as a registered Nurse and Midwife. She got an MBA in Financial Management and a Diploma in Law from the Lagos State University Ojo.

== Political career ==
In the 1980s, Nelson joined the now defunct National Republican Convention (NRC) during the regime of General Ibrahim Babangida. She was the senatorial candidate for the Lagos West Senatorial district in 1992 and was defeated at the polls by Bola Ahmed Tinubu.

In 1998, during the regime of General Abacha, she contested the Ikeja Federal Constituency in the house of assembly, this time, as a member of UNCP. She won the election but it was truncated by the death of General Abacha.

In 1999, she joined Alliance for Democracy (AD) and from 1999 to 2003, she served as the Lagos State Commissioner for Women Affairs and Poverty Alleviation during the tenure of Bola Ahmed Tinubu and has served as the Women Leader of Lagos State Chapter of The All Progressives Congress (APC) and was later made the South West Women Leader of APC.

She was the only female serving member of the Lagos State Governor’s Advisory Council (GAC).

She was the Executive Director of Operations of the Nigeria Social Insurance Trust Fund (NSITF) and previously headed the Ministry of Establishment, Training and Job Creation.

== Personal life ==
She was married to Adeyemi Nelson, a retired director of Federal Ministry of Internal Affairs. They married in 1981 and have three children. She is known for her low cut hair style and her unique headgear.

She died on 17 July 2022 at the age of 66.
