= Phillip Geissler =

American theoretical chemist (1974–2022)

Phillip L. Geissler
- Born: March 27, 1974; Ithaca, New York, U.S.
- Died: July 17, 2022 (aged 48); Canyonlands National Park, Utah, U.S.
- Occupation: Theoretical chemist
- Employer: UC Berkeley

Phillip L. Geissler (March 27, 1974 – July 17, 2022) was a theoretical chemist and the Aldo De Benedictis Distinguished Professor of Chemistry at UC Berkeley.

Geissler contributed to the theory and understanding of water, which he described as "a famously unusual liquid”. He was particularly interested in collective fluctuations that dictated kinetics in aqueous solutions, solvation, and ion-specific effects. He examined the vibrational spectra of water and the dynamical trajectories of water models and simulated air–water interfaces. He further studied the statistical mechanics of biological polymers and heterogeneous materials; explored pathways and guiding principles for nanoscale self-assembly; and developed techniques of model and algorithm development.

== Education ==
Geissler was born in 1974 in Ithaca, New York. He grew up in Charlottesville and in Richmond, Virginia, graduating from Douglas S. Freeman High School.

Geissler attended Cornell University as an undergrad from 1992 to 1996. His senior thesis was titled A Theory for the Dynamics of Polymer Melts.

He received his masters' degree and PhD from UC Berkeley, graduating in 2000. He was a postdoc at UC Berkeley in 2000 and a postdoc under Eugene Shakhnovich at Harvard in 2001. He was also an MIT Science Fellow from 2001 to 2003.

== Research and career ==
Geissler joined UC Berkeley as faculty in 2003, becoming a full professor in 2012. Geissler's research interests included chemical phenomena in condensed phases, biomolecular structure and dynamics, fluctuations in nanomaterials, the elasticity of disordered networks of semiflexible polymers, and the dynamics of nanosolutes in a liquid undergoing phase transition.

Geissler established a program in non-equilibrium statistical mechanics. He gave the 2012 Baker Lecture, titled Why would a small ion adsorb to the air-water interface? and ran a colloqium titled When soft interfaces go still: fluctuating roughness as a driving force in nanoscale assembly.

Geissler was also affiliated with Lawrence Berkeley National Laboratory and the California Institute for Quantitative Biosciences.

Geissler was an editorial committee member for Annual Reviews of Physical Chemistry, Journal of Chemical Physics, Chemical Physics Letters, and Journal of Physical Chemistry.

Geissler received the UC Berkeley Distinguished Teaching Award in 2011. Geissler was known for playing chemistry-themed songs on his guitar (such as "The Mole Song" or "Acids and Bases") when teaching class. He was also known for giving the same "quiz" on the first day of class.

== Personal life ==
Geissler's hobbies and interests included California wine, guitar playing, hiking, watching soccer or baseball, science fiction, and woodworking.

On July 17, 2022, Geissler was hiking in Canyonlands National Park, attempting a hike from Elephant Hill, and went missing. His body was found on July 19.
