= Delia Giovanola =

Argentine human rights activist (1926–2022)

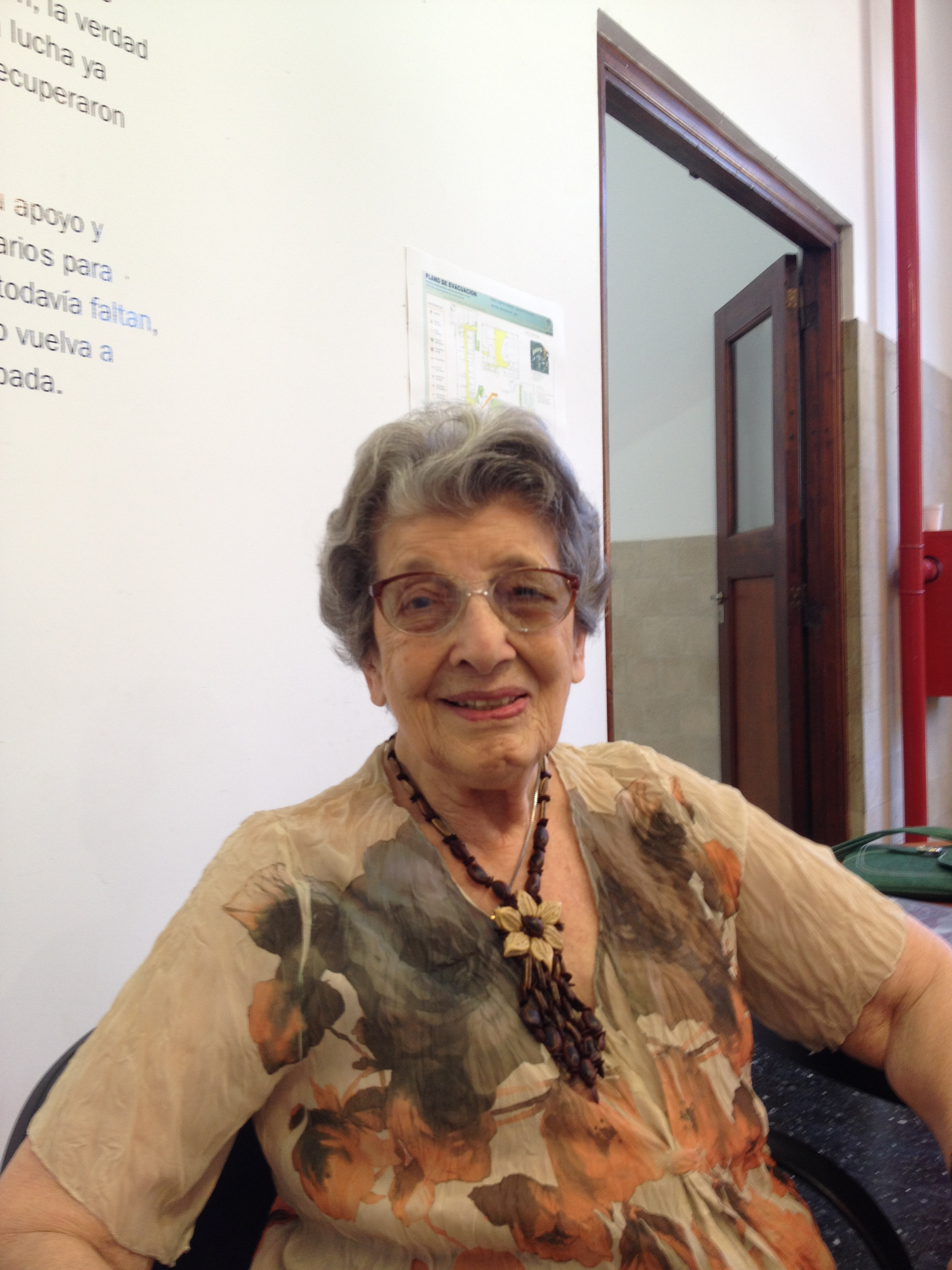
- Delia Giovanola, in 2015, during the Editathon at the House for Identity
- Born: Delia Cecilia Giovanola; February 16, 1926; La Plata, Argentina
- Died: July 18, 2022 (aged 96)
- Occupation: Human rights activist
- Organization(s): Grandmothers of Plaza de Mayo; Mothers of Plaza de Mayo

Delia Cecilia Giovanola (16 February 1926 – 18 July 2022) was an Argentine human rights activist. She was a co-founder of Grandmothers of the Plaza de Mayo.
