= Barry Goldstein =

American-born Australian geologist and regulator

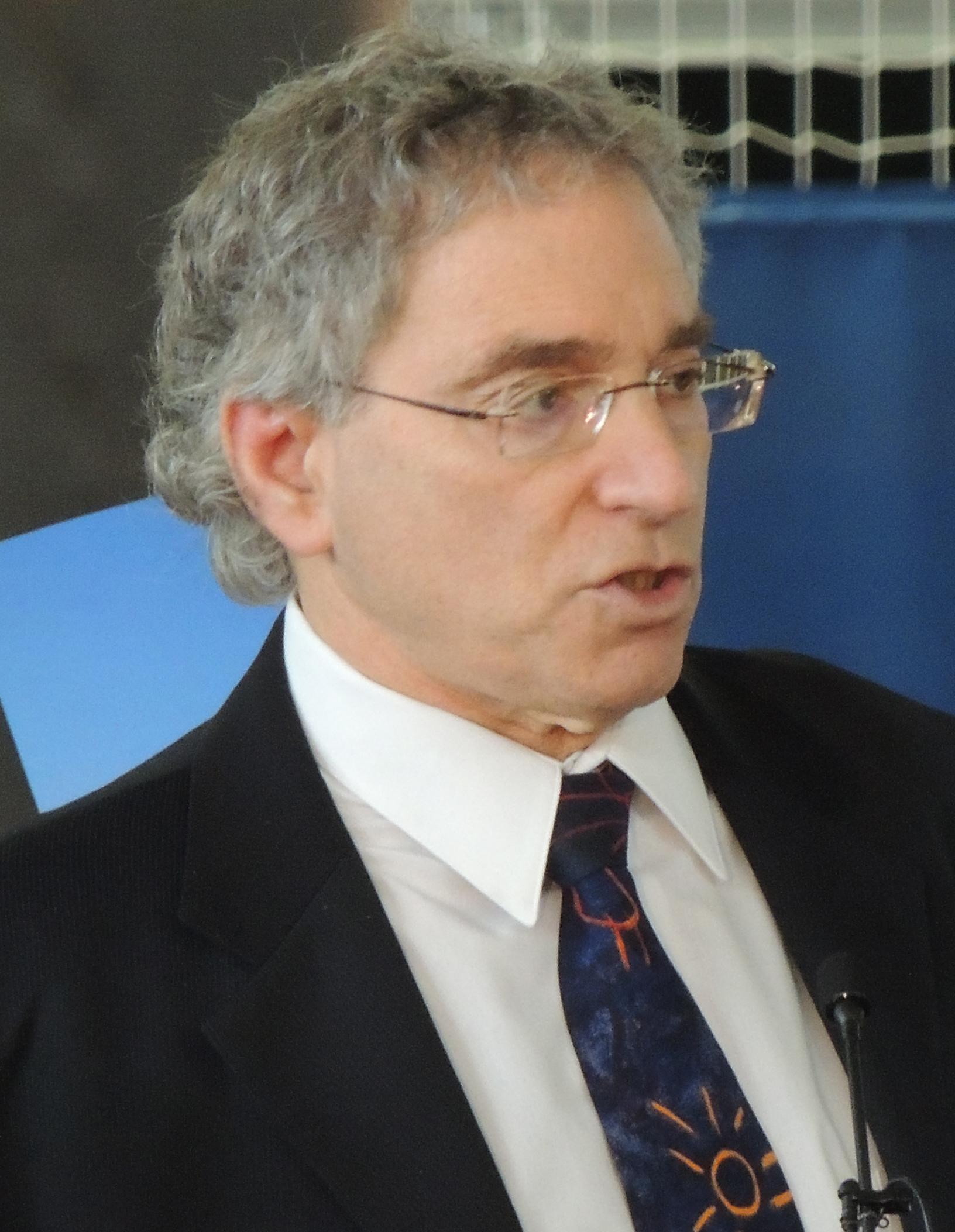
- Barry Goldstein in 2015
- Born: Barry Alan Goldstein c. 1952; New York, USA
- Died: 15 July 2022 (aged 68–69)

Barry Goldstein (c. 1952, New York - 15 July 2022) was an American-born Australian geologist, civil servant, and regulator who served as the Executive Director of Energy Resources for Southern Australia's Primary Industries and Regions department for 20 years. Former employers include Phillips Petroleum, Kuwait Foreign Petroleum Exploration Corporation, and Santos Limited.

== Early life and education ==
Goldstein was born in New York in the United States. He graduated with a degree in geology from SUNY at Binghamton in 1975 and with a Masters in geology at the University of Missouri in 1977.

== Career ==
Goldstein began his career as a geologist after finishing school, beginning in Bartlesville, Oklahoma at Phillips Petroleum. He traveled extensively before settling in Australia in the 1980s. He worked for Kuwait Foreign Petroleum Exploration Corporation in Perth (1982-1985); and Bridge Oil and Parker & Parsley Petroleum Company in Sydney (1986-1995) before joining Santos Limited in Adelaide as Chief Geologist (1996-2001). In 2002, he started working for the Government of South Australia as the Executive Director of Energy Resources, a role he held until his death in 2022.

Goldstein made discoveries in the North Sea, Indonesia, Australia, Papua New Guinea, and South America. He encouraged the early engagement of communities unfamiliar with petroleum operations, especially those in proximity to proposed fracking sites, to dispel misunderstandings about the work. He criticised past engagement efforts for only reaching out to communities affected by the petroleum work after the work had already started. He claimed that in South Australia, "no operations are approved unless statements of environmental objectives are established to assure that regulatory requirements equal or exceed community expectations for net outcomes, and operators can demonstrate capabilities to meet or exceed those regulatory requirements." He also said that South Australia created "precisely the sort of retention licenses industry needs" with bi-partisan support through the passage of the Petroleum & Geothermal Energy Act in September 2000.

He believed that problems in developing coal seam gas resources in New South Wales and Queensland are due to oil wells with low gas extraction rates. These are typically found on agricultural land. He proposed South Australian wells as deep shale gas and tight gas wells between 2,000 metres (6,600 ft) - 3,000 metres (9,800 ft) below the surface. Goldstein was the lead author of the Roadmap for Unconventional Gas Projects in South Australia, one of the state's key planning documents, and was involved with the subsequent development of the industry.

Goldstein was awarded the Public Service Medal in 2014 for his contributions to the development of South Australia's unconventional gas resources, geothermal energy and carbon sequestration potential. He was also inducted to the Australian Institute of Energy (South Australia branch) Hall of Fame in 2017.

== Personal life ==
Goldstein died on 15 July 2022.
