= Hans Wortmann =

Dutch computer scientist (1950–2022)

Johannes Casper (Hans) Wortmann (20 September 1950 – 6 July 2022) was a Dutch computer scientist and professor of Information Management at the University of Groningen, known for his contributions in the field of risk management and Industry requirements.

Wortmann received his MS in 1972 in Business Administration at the Eindhoven University of Technology, where in 1981 he also received his PhD under supervision of W.M.J. Geraerds with the thesis, entitled "Production control and information systems for component manufacturing shops."

Wortmann had started his academic career at the Eindhoven University of Technology in 1971, where he became Assistant Professor in 1981, Associate Professor in 1986 and Professor Industrial Information Systems in 1987. In 2003 he moved to the University of Groningen, where he was appointed professor of Information Management at the Faculty of Economics and Business. From 1995 to 2000 he was member of the board of directors of Baan Corporation.

== Selected publications ==
- Browne, Jim, Peter Sackett, and Hans Wortmann. "Industry requirements and associated research issues in the extended enterprise." Integrated Manufacturing Systems Engineering. Springer US, 1995. 13–28.
- Euwe, Mark J., and Hans Wortmann. "Planning systems in the next century (I)." Computers in Industry 34.2 (1997): 233–237.
- Wouters, Marc JF, Graham J. Sharman, and Hans C. Wortmann. "Reconstructing the sales and fulfillment cycle to create supply chain differentiation." International Journal of Logistics Management, The 10.2 (1999): 83–98.
- De Bakker, Karel, Albert Boonstra, and Hans Wortmann. "Does risk management contribute to IT project success? A meta-analysis of empirical evidence." International Journal of Project Management 28.5 (2010): 493–503.
