= Tony Binarelli =

Italian magician (1940–2022)

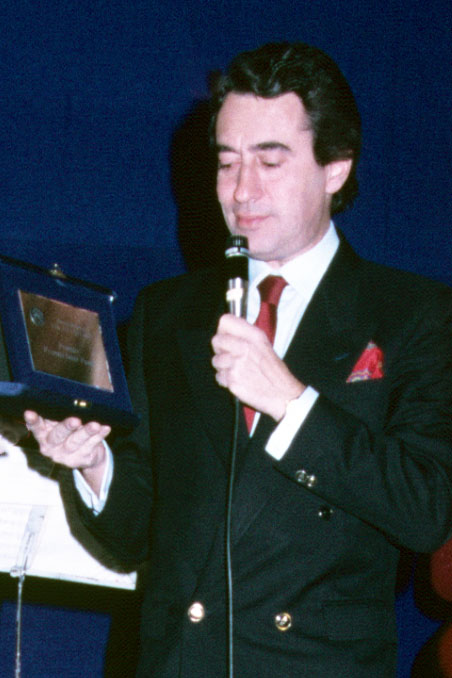
- Binarelli in 1983
- Born: Antonio Binarelli; 16 September 1940; Rome, Italy
- Died: 12 July 2022 (aged 81); Rome, Italy
- Occupation: Magician
- Spouse: Mana Angela Penn
- Website: tonybinarelli.it

Antonio Binarelli (16 September 1940 – 12 July 2022) was an Italian magician. He was awarded the Order of Merit of the Italian Republic in the 5th class Knight.

Binarelli died on 12 July 2022 at a hospital in Rome, at the age of 81.
