= Iosif Culineac =

Romanian water polo player (1941–2022)

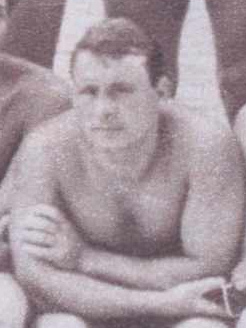

Personal information
- Nationality: Romanian
- Born: 13 August 1941 Bucharest, Romania
- Died: 26 July 2022 (aged 80) Goslar, Germany

Sport
- Sport: Water polo

Iosif Culineac (13 August 1941 – 26 July 2022) was a Romanian water polo player. He competed at the 1964 Summer Olympics and the 1972 Summer Olympics.
