= Fayat Group =

French construction company

FAYAT SAS
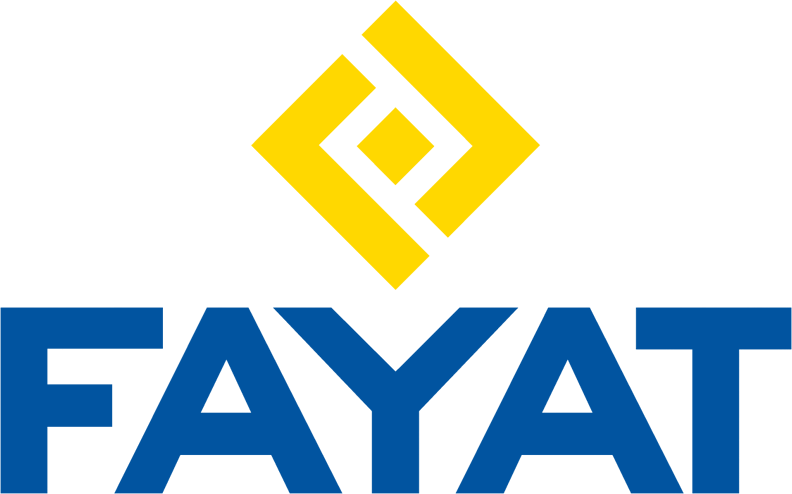
- Industry: Construction
- Founded: 1957
- Founder: Clément Fayat
- Headquarters: Bordeaux, France
- Revenue: 4.1 billion Euro turnover by the FAYAT Group in 2020
- Number of employees: About 21,505 employees worldwide
- Website: FAYAT GROUP

The Fayat Group is a French and international construction and industrial company.

It is a family owned firm, founded in 1957 by Clément Fayat, and managed by his sons Jean-Claude Fayat and Laurent Fayat. It is structured in 7 fields of activity :

- Construction engineering
- Construction
- Energy Services
- Steel Construction
- Road Building Equipment
- Handling and hoisting equipment
- Pressure vessels

There are 205 subsidiaries in 120 countries, 21,505 employees, and 2020 revenue of Euro 4.1 billion Fayat is the largest independent construction group in France.

Acquisitions include: Dulevo, Dynapac, BOMAG, Mecalac, and LeeBoy.

One of Fayat's subsidiaries is working on the controversial Upper Yeywa dam project in Shan State, Myanmar (Burma). The dam is opposed by local residents and will result in displacement and environmental damage.
