= Johannes Willms =

German historian and journalist (1948–2022)

- Born: 25 May 1948; Würzburg, Bavaria, Germany
- Died: 11 July 2022 (aged 74); Munich, Bavaria, Germany
- Education: University of Vienna; University of Seville; Heidelberg University
- Occupations: Historian, journalist

Johannes Willms (25 May 1948 – 11 July 2022) was a German historian and journalist.

== Biography ==
Born in Würzburg, Willms spent his childhood in Karlsruhe where his father, Günther Willms, was a judge on the Federal Court of Justice. He earned his Abitur at the Bismarck-Gymnasium Karlsruhe and studied classical philology, history, art history, and political science at the University of Vienna, the University of Seville, and Heidelberg University. In 1975, he earned his doctorate at Heidelberg under the instruction of Reinhart Koselleck.

Willms worked as a journalist for the Hessian radio station Hessischer Rundfunk and the television channel ZDF. He served as director of the magazine Aspekte from 1988 to 1992 and co-founded the television channel Das Literarische Quartett. From 1993 to 2000, he was literary director of the daily newspaper Süddeutsche Zeitung and lived in Paris as a correspondent. In 2008, he was awarded the Prix de l'Académie de Berlin.

Aside from journalism, Willms wrote several historical publications, primarily on the history of France.

Johannes Willms died in Munich on 11 July 2022 at the age of 74.

== Publications ==
- Die Politik der officiers royaux auf den Etats Généraux 1576–1614 (1975)
- Bücherfreunde, Büchernarren – Entwurf zur Archäologie einer Leidenschaft (1978)
- Nationalismus ohne Nation. Deutsche Geschichte von 1789 bis 1914 (1983)
- Paris. Hauptstadt Europas 1789–1914 (1988)
- Bismarck – Dämon der Deutschen. Anmerkungen zu einer Legende (1987)
- Napoleon. Verbannung und Verklärung (2000)
- Die deutsche Krankheit. Eine kurze Geschichte der Gegenwart (2001)
- Gebrauchsanweisung für Frankreich (2005)
- Napoleon. Eine Biographie (2005)
- Balzac. Eine Biographie (2007)
- St. Helena. Kleine Insel, großer Wahn (2007)
- Napoléon III. Frankreichs letzter Kaiser (2008)
- Frankreich (2009)
- Stendhal. Biographie (2010)
- Talleyrand. Virtuose der Macht 1754–1838 (2011)
- Tugend und Terror. Geschichte der Französischen Revolution (2014)
- Waterloo. Napoleons letzte Schlacht (2015)
- Mirabeau oder Die Morgenröte der Revolution (2017)
- Der General Charles de Gaulle und sein Jahrhundert. Biographie (2019)
- Der Mythos Napoleon. Verheißung – Verbannung – Verklärung (2020)
