= Knud J. V. Jespersen =

Danish historian (1942–2022)

Knud Jesper Vinggaard Jespersen was a Danish historian (8 February 1942 - 29 July 2022). Over his career he has published a number of academic texts on Danish history while a professor at the University of Southern Denmark and has served as the historiographer royal of Denmark.

== Biography ==
Jespersen was the son of a farmer from North Funen and so he initially trained to be a farmer. Jespersen went on to Odense University where he earned his postgraduate qualifications in the 1970s. In 1975 he was appointed associate professor and in 1996 professor.

After he retired, Jespersen was appointed historiographer royal where he promoted the teaching of history in Denmark's primary schools.

== Works ==
Jespersen, Knud J. V. (2018). A History of Denmark (3rd ed.). London: Macmillan Education UK. ISBN 978-1-137-61181-9. OCLC 1225549975.
