= Aldo Pastore =

Italian politician (1930–2022)

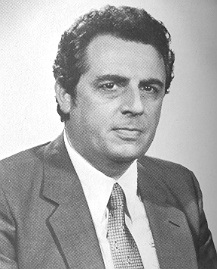
- Pastore's picture

Member of the Chamber of Deputies of Italy
- In office 20 June 1979 – 1 July 1987

Personal details
- Born: 15 December 1930 Savona, Italy
- Died: 26 July 2022 (aged 91) Savona, Italy
- Party: Italian Communist Party; Democratic Party of the Left

Aldo Pastore (15 December 1930 – 26 July 2022) was an Italian politician. He served as a member of the Chamber of Deputies of Italy. Pastore died on 26 July 2022, at the age of 91.
