= Mario Chella =

Italian politician (1934–2022)

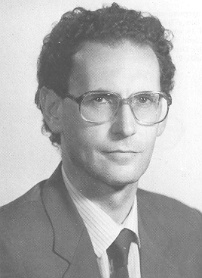
- Chella in the 1980s

Member of the Chamber of Deputies of Italy
- In office 1983–1992

Personal details
- Born: 16 March 1934 Udine, Italy
- Died: 13 July 2022 (aged 88) Sestri Levante, Italy
- Party: Italian Communist Party; Democratic Party of the Left; Democrats of the Left

Mario Chella (16 March 1934 – 13 July 2022) was an Italian politician. He served as a member of the Chamber of Deputies of Italy from 1983 to 1992. Chella died in July 2022, at the age of 88.

== Biography ==
Chella was born in Udine in 1934. He held a degree in medicine.

He served as a member of parliament for the Italian Communist Party during the 9th and 10th legislatures between 1983 and 1987. From 1994 to 2003, he served as mayor of the Ligurian municipality of Sestri Levante, representing the center-left civic list “Progresso per Sestri Levante” during his first term and the Democrats of the Left during his second term.

After leading the Regional Social Investment Foundation in the early 2000s, Chella returned to the public eye in October 2015 when he publicly defended the neighboring town of Chiavari against the Metropolitan City of Genoa's decision to build a wastewater treatment plant in the Colmata a Mare area, coming into conflict with the local Democratic Party.

He died on July 13, 2022, at the age of 88.
