= Meng Zhaozhen =

Chinese landscape architect (1932–2022)

- 孟兆祯
- Born: 13 September 1932; Wuhan, Hubei, China
- Died: 15 July 2022 (aged 89); Beijing, China
- Education: China Agricultural University
- Scientific career
- Fields: Landscape design
- Workplaces: Beijing Forestry University

Chinese name
- Simplified Chinese: 孟兆祯
- Traditional Chinese: 孟兆禎
Transcriptions
Standard Mandarin
- Hanyu Pinyin: Mèng Zhàozhēn

Meng Zhaozhen (Chinese: 孟兆祯; 13 September 1932 – 15 July 2022) was a Chinese landscape architect who was a professor at Beijing Forestry University, and an academician of the Chinese Academy of Engineering.

== Biography ==
Meng was born in Wuhan, Hubei, on 13 September 1932. After graduating from Nankai High School in 1952, he was admitted to Beijing Agricultural University (now China Agricultural University), where he majored in landscape architecture. He joined the Chinese Communist Party (CCP) in February 1956. After graduation, he stayed and taught at the university. After university department adjustment, he moved to Beijing Forestry University, where he successively served as an assistant, lecturer, associate professor, and professor.

On 15 July 2022, he died from an illness in Beijing, at the age of 89.

== Contributions ==
His works include Fairy Lake Botanical Garden, Sugen Garden of Beijing Botanical Garden and the rockery of Olympic Forest Park.

== Publications ==
- 园衍 [Garden] (in Chinese). Beijing: China Architecture & Building Press. 2012. ISBN 9787112147021.

== Honours and awards ==
- 1999 Member of the Chinese Academy of Engineering (CAE)
