= Perry Rubenstein =

American gallerist (1954–2022)

Perry Roy Rubenstein
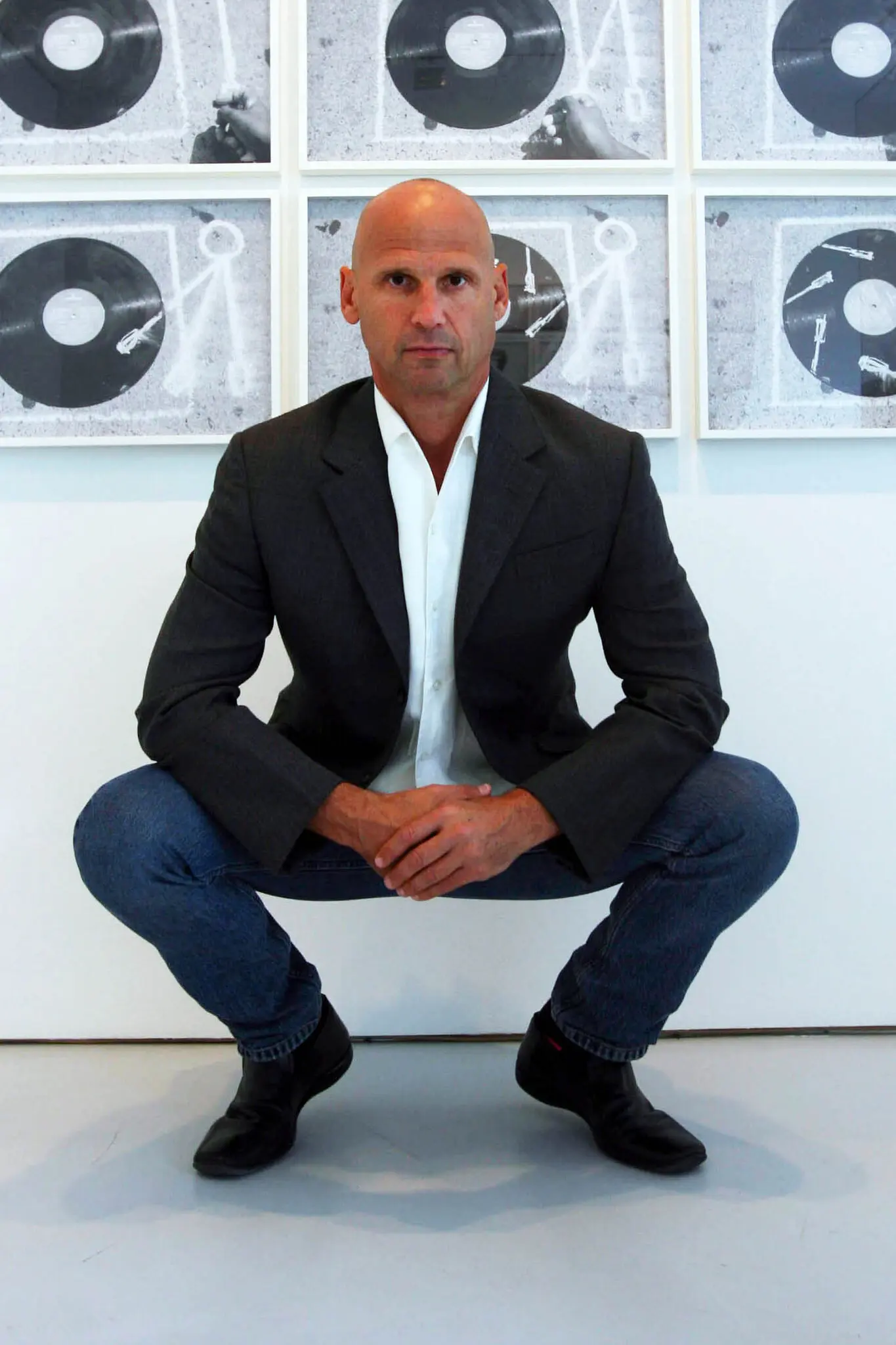
- Born: January 15, 1954; Philadelphia, PA
- Died: July 21, 2022 (Age 68); Los Angeles, CA.
- Spouse: Sara Fitzmaurice (m. 1996; div. 2014)
- Children: 2

Perry Roy Rubenstein (January 15, 1954 - July 21, 2022) was an American gallerist and private art advisor.

== Early life ==
Perry Roy Rubenstein was born on January 15, 1954, in Philadelphia, PA, to Samuel Rubenstein and Lydia Rubenstein (née Kogan, later Virshup), a homemaker. He was raised by his stepfather, Edwin Virshup, who owned and operated a distribution company. Both sets of his grandparents hailed from Ukraine's Odessa Oblast.

After graduating high school, Rubenstein matriculated at The Pennsylvania State University in State College, PA., from which he received a Bachelor of the Arts degree in History in May, 1975.

== Career ==
After graduating from Penn State, Rubenstein moved to Europe, settling in Milan where he took up work in the fashion industry.

By chance, he was scouted to model for Gianni Versace, who was beginning to establish a name for himself in the fashion world. Receiving further work as a model, Rubenstein booked jobs across Europe, the Americas, and Asia, collecting art from artists he encountered, including Francesco Clemente, Sandro Chia, and Enzo Cucchi, all of whom went on to establish major careers.

Returning to the United States in the early 1980s, Rubenstein settled in the West Chelsea neighborhood of New York, where he parlayed his extensive contacts in the art world to gain work as an advisor to collectors, painters, sculptors, and gallerists. For a time, Rubenstein lived in the same building as contemporary artist Julian Schnabel's studio, with whom he formed a friendship. In New York, he became embedded in the downtown art scene of the 1980 and 1990s, moving in circles that included Andy Warhol, Larry Gagosian, Tony Shafrazi, and Jean-Michel Basquiat. In a later essay, Rubenstein reflected on his tumultuous friendship with Basquiat during the early stages of the artist's career.

In 2004, Rubenstein opened his eponymous gallery, Perry Rubenstein Gallery, to great success. By 2010, he had grown the gallery to encompass three spaces across Downtown Manhattan, one of which was dedicated to the display of works by new and up-and-coming artists at the time, offering early representation to artists including Robin Rhode and Amir Zaki.

In 2011, Rubenstein relocated his business to Los Angeles, taking advantage of the West Coast gallery boom, opening a Perry Rubenstein Gallery on North Highland Avenue in Hollywood. His first exhibition in his Los Angeles gallery was a solo show of works by the photographer Helmut Newton. Rubenstein sold major works by Andy Warhol, Willem de Kooning, Takashi Murakami, and Richard Prince, among others.

Despite his early and extensive success in New York, Rubenstein struggled to gain a meaningful foothold in the Los Angeles art scene, shuttering his gallery in 2014.

After the closure of his gallery, Rubenstein returned to private art advisory.

== Legal issues ==
In 2016, he was charged with embezzlement related to the sale of artworks. In 2017, he pled no contest to the charges of embezzlement and agreed to pay restitution. He was sentenced to six months in prison.

== Personal life ==
On June 27th, 1996, Rubenstein married public relations executive and art advisor Sara Fitzmaurice in an interfaith ceremony at the Basilica of St Mary in Minneapolis.

On October 20, 2002, Fitzmaurice and Rubenstein welcomed their first daughter, Raffaella Rae in New York, NY. Four years later, on May 20, 2006, the couple had their second daughter, Scarlett James, also in New York, NY.

Rubenstein died of natural causes on July 21, 2022, in Los Angeles, CA.
