= Herman O. Thomson =

United States Air Force general (1929–2022

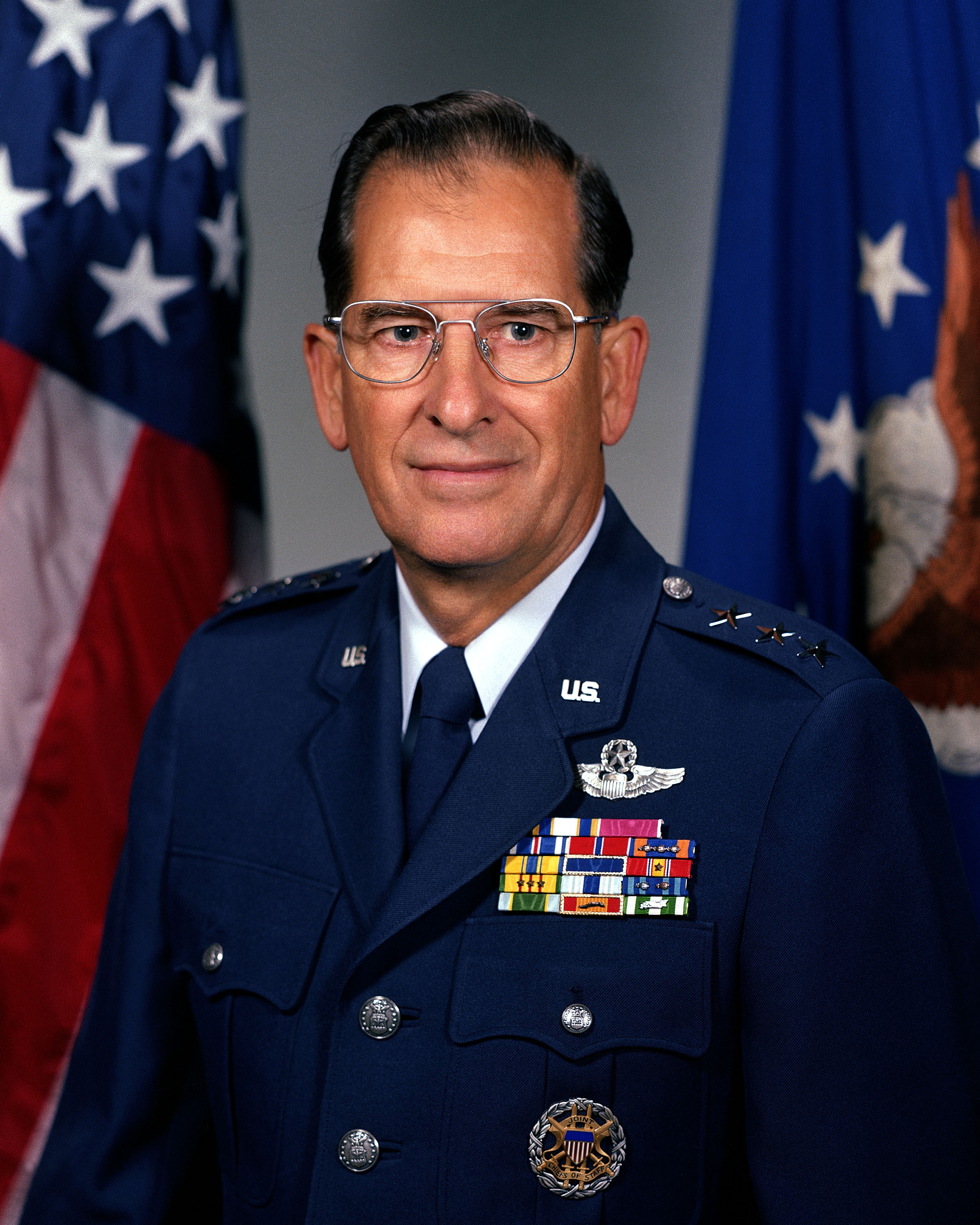
- Born: 6 April 1929; Belton, Texas U.S.
- Died: 10 July 2022 (aged 93); San Antonio, Texas, U.S.
- Military career
- Allegiance: United States
- Branch: United States Air Force
- Service years: 1951–1985
- Rank: Lieutenant general
- Nickname: Tommy
- Commands: Director for plans and policy, Joint Staff; Vice Commander in Chief, Pacific Air Forces

Herman Otha Thomson (April 6, 1929 – July 10, 2022) was a lieutenant general in the United States Air Force who served as director for plans and policy for the Joint Staff from 1983 to 1985. He was commissioned through ROTC at Texas A&M University in 1951. Thomson died in San Antonio, Texas on July 10, 2022, at the age of 93.
