= Henry Carlson Jr. =

American politician (1925–2022)

Member of the South Dakota Senate
- In office 1977–1978
- In office 1983–1984

Personal details
- Born: May 24, 1925 Sioux Falls, South Dakota, U.S.
- Died: July 14, 2022 (aged 97)
- Party: Republican
- Spouse: Eleanor
- Children: 4
- Education: University of Colorado Boulder

Henry Carlson Jr. (May 24, 1925 – July 14, 2022) was an American politician. He served as a Republican member of the South Dakota Senate.

== Life and career ==
Carlson was born in Sioux Falls, South Dakota and graduated from Washington High School in 1943. After high school, he joined the United States Army Air Forces as a private and was stationed at Gunter Field as a pre-flight cadet. While in the army, he attended Lafayette College and Amherst College. After serving in the army, he enrolled at the University of Colorado Boulder and studied Civil Engineering.

Carlson served in the South Dakota Senate from 1977 to 1978 and again from 1983 to 1984.

Carlson died on July 14, 2022, at the age of 97.
