= Don Talbot (author) =

Australian author (1933–2024)

- Born: Charles Donald Talbot; 11 October 1933; Manchester, England
- Died: 16 July 2022 (aged 88); Toowoomba, Queensland, Australia
- Citizenship: Australian
- Occupations: Biographer, historian, journalist
- Children: 3

Charles Donald Talbot (11 October 1933 – 16 July 2022) was an Australian author based in Toowoomba, Queensland.

== Early life and career ==
Talbot was born in Manchester, England on 11 October 1933. He trained as a journalist on the Isle of Man before moving to Australia in 1953. He worked on newspapers and magazines and spent 17 years with the Australian Broadcasting Corporation working with Radio Australia, and ABC national radio and television in Victoria and Queensland. He implemented the first radio news service for Aborigines and Islanders for the ABC in Mackay in 1981, and worked at the ABC in Toowoomba for several years.

Before settling in Toowoomba, Don spent three years in Canberra as a specialist writer on trade matters with the Australian Department of Overseas Trade.

In 1982, he was employed by The Chronicle (Toowoomba) and his duties ranged from feature writer to pictorial editor and sub-editor. He edited his own newspaper The Lockyer Journal (1986–89), before becoming the first Press officer at the University of Southern Queensland. He wrote media press releases and edited the university's first staff newspaper, the Phoenix Gazette.

Upon his retirement in 1993 Talbot began to concentrate on writing books and special articles.

Don wrote historical and biographical books, with particular focus on the people and places in Toowoomba and the surrounding Darling Downs area.

== Personal life and death ==
Talbot was a past President of the Toowoomba Historical Society, his tenure lasting from 1999 to 2000. He was married to Patricia, and they had two sons and one daughter.

Talbot died in Toowoomba on 16 July 2022, at the age of 88.

== Bibliography ==
1984

They Meant Business – an illustrated history of eight Toowoomba enterprises. Darling Downs Institute Press, (contributing writer). ISBN 0-909306-72-9.

1987

History of Psychiatric Nursing in Toowoomba (unpublished: held at Baillie Henderson Hospital for research purposes).

1989

School Ties – a history of private schooling in Toowoomba. USQ Press (contributing writer). ISBN 0-949414-31-X.

1990

The Toowoomba Book (writer and Ed.).
History of Concordia Memorial College. ISBN 0-949414-32-8.

1991

The Toowoomba Book (writer).

1992

History of Blanchview School, Queensland, 1890-1965.
History of Withcott and the Upper Lockyer Vol. 1. ISBN 0-646-06661-7.
The Toowoomba Book (principal writer).

1994

History of Withcott and the Upper Lockyer Vol. 2. ISBN 0-646-16850-9.

1995

King of the Road – biography of Jack McCafferty. ISBN 0-646-23461-7.
History of Wyreema State School 1895-1995.
Farming in the Darling Downs Region, Queensland Department of Primary Industries (writer). ISBN 0-7242-5938-4.

1997

History of Toowoomba Fire Brigade 1877-1997. ISBN 0-646-33012-8.
History of Nobby School.

1998

History of Steam and Flowers (Spring Bluff).

1999

Ben’s book of Bush Ballads.

2000

History of the Queensland Barley Marketing Board 1930-1991. (Published 2004).
History of the Queensland Grain Sorghum Marketing Board 1965-1991. (Published 2004).
Biological Farmers of Australia magazine (Ed.)
Report on the Location of the Helidon Fort 1842-1846, Centre for Applied History and Heritage Studies, University of Queensland.
Forever Home – 100 years in the life of Toowoomba and the Darling Downs (contributor and joint Ed.). ISBN 0646400215.

2001

History of Gatton State School, Queensland, 1876-2001. ISBN 0-646-41418-6.
Midst the Mulga 2001, Murweh Shire tourist magazine, Charleville (writer and Ed.).
Talbot –a family history 1558-2001. ISBN 0-9580584-0-7.

2002

Clive – biography of Clive Berghofer. ISBN 0-9750183-0-2.
Berneila – the History of the C.B. Bazley family in England and Australia.

2003

Toowoomba – Strange and unusual tales Vol. 1. (Co-authored with John Larkin).
Toowoomba – More strange and unusual tales Vol. 2. (Co-authored with John Larkin). ISBN 1-920855-14-9.
History of Lourdes Aged Care Home 1963-2003, Toowoomba.
The Southern Inland Queensland Economic Prospectus. (Editorial writer). ISBN 0-9750935-0-9.

2004

Toowoomba – More strange and unusual tales Vol 3. (Co-authored with John Larkin). ISBN 0-9580584-1-5.
Tabeel Lutheran Home 1954-2004 – 50 years of Service to the Community.ISBN 0-9580584-2-3.
Ghostly Tales of Toowoomba. ISBN 0-9580584-3-1.

2005

Grantham State School 1905-2005 – a History of Grantham School and the town of Grantham in Queensland. ISBN 0-9580584-4-X.
A History of Gatton and District 1824-2004. (Prepared for publication in 2009).

2007

Toowoomba – More strange and unusual tales Vol 4. ISBN 978-0-9803329-0-2
Toowoomba – More strange and unusual tales Vol 5. ISBN 978-0-9803329-1-9

2008

Toowoomba – More strange and unusual tales Vol 6. ISBN 978-0-9803329-2-6
The Wielands of Heathmont (Victoria).ISBN 978-0-980-3329-3 3

2009

Toowoomba – More Strange and unusual tales Vol 7. ISBN 978-0-9803329-4-0

2012

Silverdale: Secrets of an Asylym. ISBN 978-0-9803329-5-7
