= Michael O. Emerson =

American sociologist of religion

- Citizenship: American
- Known for: Co-founding the Kinder Institute for Urban Research; Portraits of American Life Study
- Awards: Distinguished Book Award, Society for the Scientific Study of Religion (2001); Oliver Cromwell Cox Award, American Sociological Association (2007); George R. Brown Prize for Excellence in Teaching, Rice University (2006, 2014)

Academic background
- Education: University of North Carolina at Chapel Hill (M.A., Ph.D.); Loyola University Chicago (B.A.)
- Thesis: The Urban Underclass: A Theory of Separate Spheres (1991)

Academic work
- Discipline: Sociology
- Sub-discipline: Sociology of religion Urban sociology Race and ethnicity
- Institutions: Rice University; University of Illinois Chicago; North Park University; University of Notre Dame; St. John's University; Bethel University
- Notable works: Divided by Faith (2000 and 2025); People of the Dream (2006); Blacks and Whites in Christian America (2012); The Religion of Whiteness (2024)

Michael O. Emerson is an American sociologist of religion and author whose known for his work on religion, race and ethnicity, urban sociology, and public policy. He is the Harry and Hazel Chavanne Fellow in Religion and Public Policy and Director of the Religion and Public Policy Program at the Baker Institute for Public Policy at Rice University. At Rice University, Emerson was the founding director of the Center on Race, Religion, and Urban Life and co-founded the Kinder Institute for Urban Research with Stephen Klineberg in 2010. He was the President of the Association for the Sociology of Religion from 2015 to 2017. Emerson served as Professor of Sociology and Department Head at the University of Illinois at Chicago from 2020 to 2023. Since June 2023, he has held the Chavanne Fellowship at the Baker Institute at Rice University, where he directs the Religion and Public Policy Program (RP3).

His research on racial segregation in American churches and the role of evangelical theology in sustaining racial division has informed commentary on national events. Following the 2008 U.S. presidential election, Emerson noted in Christianity Today that white Christians and Christians of color voted sharply differently due to "separate cultures because of racial segregation in the churches," with white evangelicals emphasizing issues such as abortion and homosexuality while African American and Hispanic Christians also stressed justice concerns including equal rights, poverty, and war (Zylstra 2008).

Emerson's 2000 book Divided by Faith: Evangelical Religion and the Problem of Race in America, co-authored with Christian Smith, won the 2001 Distinguished Book Award from the Society for the Scientific Study of Religion.

== Education ==
Emerson earned a B.A. in sociology (summa cum laude) from Loyola University of Chicago in 1988, where he received the Gallagher Key Award. He completed an M.A. (1990) and Ph.D. (1991) in sociology at the University of North Carolina at Chapel Hill. His doctoral dissertation was titled The Urban Underclass: A Theory of Separate Spheres.

== Career ==
Emerson began his academic career as an assistant professor of sociology at St. John's University (1991–1995), then moved to Bethel University (1995–1999). He joined Rice University in 1999, where he held several positions including the R.A. Tsanoff Professor of Public Affairs and Sociology and later the Allyn R. & Gladys M. Cline Professor of Sociology (2005–2015). At Rice, he founded and directed the Center on Race, Religion, and Urban Life (2005) and co-founded, with Stephen Klineberg, the Kinder Institute for Urban Research (2010).

From 2015 to 2019, Emerson served as Provost and Professor of Sociology and Urban Studies at North Park University in Chicago. He then served as Professor of Sociology and Department Head at the University of Illinois at Chicago (2020–2023).

Since June 2023, he has held the Chavanne Fellowship at the Baker Institute at Rice University, where he directs the Religion and Public Policy Program (RP3). The program conducts research on domestic and international religious issues, convenes discourse among public and private sector leaders, and aims to inform policymakers of the impacts of religion and inform religious communities of the roles of public policy.

Emerson has also been a visiting professor at the Danish Institute for Study Abroad, where he helped design the institution's Urban Studies program.

== Work and research ==
=== Divided by Faith (2000) ===
Emerson is best known for Divided by Faith: Evangelical Religion and the Problem of Race in America (Oxford University Press, 2000), co-authored with Christian Smith. The book examines how white evangelical theology and practice contribute to racial division in the United States. It received the 2001 Distinguished Book Award from the Society for the Scientific Study of Religion and has sold more than 100,000 copies. A 25th anniversary updated edition was published by Oxford University Press in 2025.

The book's framework has been influential in subsequent scholarship on religion and urban life; for example, Mulder and Smith (2009) drew on Emerson and Smith's study of evangelicals and racialization as a point of departure for examining evangelical anti-urban bias and suburban settlement patterns.

A follow-up book on the subject is Blacks and Whites in Christian America: How Racial Discrimination Shapes Religious Convictions (NYU Press, 2012), co-authored with Jason Shelton. The book examines how racial group membership shapes the ways black and white Protestants think about and practice Christianity. Drawing on the 2006 Portraits of American Life Study, the 2006 General Social Survey, interviews with clergy, and focus groups with black Protestants, Shelton and Emerson argue that while black and white Protestants share core Christian beliefs, their approaches to faith diverge significantly due to the legacy of racial discrimination. The study provides quantitative and qualitative support for C. Eric Lincoln and Lawrence Mamiya's "black sacred cosmos" thesis (Barber 2014). The book received the 2012 C. Calvin Smith Book Award from the Southern Conference of African American Studies.

=== Portraits of American Life Study ===
Emerson served as primary investigator for the Portraits of American Life Study, a longitudinal panel study funded by the Lilly Endowment with grants totaling over $3.9 million across its two waves (2003–2007 and 2011–2013). The study followed the same 1,300 individuals over the course of their lives, with interview waves completed in 2006 and 2012. The project included oversamples of African Americans, Asian Americans, and Latinos to analyze religious life within specific racial and ethnic communities.

== Selected publications ==
=== Books ===
- Emerson, M.O. and Smith, C. (2000) Divided by Faith: Evangelical Religion and the Problem of Race in America. New York: Oxford University Press.
- Emerson, M.O. and Woo, R. (2006) People of the Dream: Multiracial Congregations in the United States. Princeton: Princeton University Press.
- Smith, C. and Emerson, M.O. (2008) Passing the Plate: Why American Christians Don’t Give Away More Money. New York: Oxford University Press.
- Religion Matters: What Sociology Teaches Us About Religion in Our World (Allyn & Bacon, 2010), co-authored with William Mirola and Susan Monahan.
- Shelton, J.E. and Emerson, M.O., 2012. Blacks and whites in Christian America: How racial discrimination shapes religious convictions. In Blacks and Whites in Christian America. New York University Press.
- The (Un)Making of Race and Ethnicity: A Reader (Oxford University Press, 2016), co-edited with Jenifer Bratter and Sergio Chavez.
- Emerson, M.O. and Smiley, K. (2018) Market Cities, People Cities: The Shape of Our Urban Future. New York: NYU Press.
- Emerson, M.O. and Bracey, G.E. (2024) The Religion of Whiteness: How Racism Distorts Christian Faith. New York: Oxford University Press.

=== Articles ===
- Emerson, M.O., 1996. Through tinted glasses: Religion, worldviews, and abortion attitudes. Journal for the Scientific Study of Religion, pp. 41–55.
- Emerson, M.O., Smith, C. and Sikkink, D., 1999. Equal in Christ, but not in the world: White conservative Protestants and explanations of black-white inequality. Social Problems, 46(3), pp. 398–417.
- Emerson, M.O., Yancey, G. and Chai, K.J., 2001. Does race matter in residential segregation? Exploring the preferences of white Americans. American sociological review, 66(6), pp. 922–935.
- Emerson, M.O., Kimbro, R.T. and Yancey, G., 2002. Contact theory extended: The effects of prior racial contact on current social ties. Social Science Quarterly, 83(3), pp. 745–761.
- Emerson, M.O. and Yancey, G., 2008. African Americans in interracial congregations an analysis of demographics, social networks, and social attitudes. Review of Religious Research, pp. 301–318.
- Lewis, V.A., Emerson, M.O. and Klineberg, S.L., 2011. Who we'll live with: Neighborhood racial composition preferences of whites, blacks and Latinos. Social forces, 89(4), pp. 1385–1407.
- Edwards, K.L., Christerson, B. and Emerson, M.O., 2013. Race, religious organizations, and integration. Annual Review of Sociology, 39(1), pp. 211–228.
- Emerson, M.O., Korver-Glenn, E. and Douds, K.W., 2015. Studying race and religion: A critical assessment. Sociology of Race and Ethnicity, 1(3), pp. 349–359.
- Dougherty, K.D. and Emerson, M.O., 2018. The changing complexion of American congregations. Journal for the Scientific Study of Religion, 57(1), pp. 24–38.
- Dougherty, K.D., Chaves, M. and Emerson, M.O., 2020. Racial diversity in US congregations, 1998–2019. Journal for the Scientific Study of Religion, 59(4), pp. 651–662.

== Awards ==
- George R. Brown Award for Superior Teaching, Rice University (2003, 2007, 2008)
- George R. Brown Prize for Excellence in Teaching, Rice University (2006, 2014)
- Sarah Burnett Teaching Prize, Rice University (2012)
- President, Association for the Sociology of Religion (2015–2017)
