= Benton Johnson =

American sociologist (1928–2024)

- Born: August 19, 1928; Chapel Hill, North Carolina, U.S.
- Died: January 8, 2024 (aged 95); Eugene, Oregon, U.S.
- Occupation: Sociologist
- Spouse: Miriam M. Johnson
- Children: Shannon; Rebekah
- Parent(s): Guy Benton Johnson; Guion Griffis Johnson

Guy Benton Johnson Jr. (August 19, 1928 – January 8, 2024) was an American sociologist and professor emeritus of the University of Oregon's Department of Sociology.

== Biography ==
Guy Benton Johnson Jr. was born in Chapel Hill, North Carolina, on August 19, 1928, the son of Guy Benton Johnson and Guion Griffis Johnson. He was named after his father, but was called "Benny" and continued to use "Benton" in adulthood.

Johnson's father was a sociologist and anthropologist, while his mother was a noted historian. While in college, Johnson met Miriam Massey. They married on July 21, 1951. Miriam also pursued a successful career in sociology, focusing on family issues and gender roles. Together they had two children.

Johnson died on January 8, 2024, at the age of 95.

== Academic career ==
Johnson is best known for his work related to the theory and typology of religious movements. He received a Bachelor of Arts degree from the University of North Carolina at Chapel Hill and then, in 1954, a doctorate in sociology from Harvard University. While at Harvard, he was a student of Talcott Parsons.

Prior to joining the Department of Sociology at the University of Oregon, Johnson taught at Guilford College and the University of Texas at Austin. He has chaired both the University of Oregon's Sociology Department and its Department of Religious Studies.

Between 1972 and 1974, Johnson was Editor of the Journal for the Scientific Study of Religion. He has served as president of the Society for the Scientific Study of Religion (1980–81), the Association for the Sociology of Religion (1987) and the Religious Research Association (1995–96).

== Awards ==
Vanishing Boundaries: the Religion of Protestant Baby Boomers, co-written by Johnson, received the Society for the Scientific Study of Religion's annual book award in 1994.

== See also ==
- List of cult and new religious movement researchers
- List of sociologists
