= Association for the Sociology of Religion =

- Abbreviation: ASR
- Formation: 1938; 88 years ago
- Founded at: Chicago, Illinois, US
- Type: Learned society
- Legal status: 501(c)(6) organization
- Location: United States
- Field: Sociology of religion
- Members: 402 (2019)
- President: Tricia Bruce
- Executive officer: Rachel Kraus
- Revenue: $112,660 (2016)
- Expenses: $79,945 (2016)
- Website: sociologyofreligion.org
- Formerly called: American Catholic Sociological Society

The Association for the Sociology of Religion (ASR) is an academic association with more than 700 members worldwide. It publishes a journal, Sociology of Religion, and holds meetings at the same venues and times as the American Sociological Association.

== History ==
The ASR was founded by Catholic sociologists in Chicago in 1938 as the American Catholic Sociological Society. The organization adopted its present name in 1970, reflecting changes in the Vatican's policy that led to greater openness towards other faiths. It has long since become a base for sociological research on religion without regard to belief, creed, or religious orientation.

== Activities ==
The association publishes a journal, Sociology of Religion, as well as a quarterly newsletter. It is the co-publisher of an annual series entitled Religion and the Social Order. The association provides research grants.

The ASR, which has over 700 members worldwide, continues its historical practice of holding its meetings at the same venues and times as the American Sociological Association, allowing mutual cross-fertilization between the two associations. Past presidents of the ASR include David G. Bromley, James T. Richardson, Eileen Barker Benton Johnson, and Christopher G. Ellison.

== Presidents ==
- 1938: Ralph A. Gallagher
- 1939: Raymond W. Murray
- 1940: Paul J. Mundie
- 1941: Francis J. Friedel
- 1942: Walter L. Willigan
- 1943: Eva J. Ross
- 1944: Paul Hanly Furfey
- 1945: Gerald J. Schnepp
- 1946: Alphonse H. Clemens
- 1947: Leo J. Robinson
- 1948: Franz Mueller
- 1949: Robert B. Navin
- 1950: Clement S. Mihanovich
- 1951: Thomas P. Harte
- 1952: John J. Kane
- 1953: Joseph P. Fitzpatrick
- 1954: C. J. Neuse
- 1955: M. Jeanine Gruesser
- 1956: D. Augustine McCaffrey
- 1957: Allen Spitzer
- 1958: John D. Donovan
- 1959: Mary Edward Healy
- 1960: John L. Thomas
- 1961: Jack H. Curtis
- 1962: Frances Jerome Woods
- 1963: John E. Hughes
- 1964: Paul Facey
- 1965: Paul Mundy
- 1966: Andrew Greeley
- 1967: Donald N. Barrett
- 1968: Gordon Zahn
- 1969: Robert J. McNamara
- 1970: Paul Reiss
- 1971: Ralph Lane Jr.
- 1972: Marie Augusta Neal
- 1973: Thomas P. Imse
- 1974: William H. Jarrett
- 1975: Ruth A. Wallace
- 1976: John L. Thomas
- 1977: David O. Moberg
- 1978: Thomas M. Gannon
- 1979: Jeffrey K. Hadden
- 1980: Carroll J. Bourg
- 1981: Hart M. Nelsen
- 1982: Meredith B. McGuire
- 1983: Rodney Stark
- 1984: Patrick H. McNamara
- 1985: William R. Garrett
- 1986: James T. Richardson
- 1987: Benton Johnson
- 1988: Roland Robertson
- 1989: James A. Beckford
- 1990: Helen Rose Ebaugh
- 1991: Theodore E. Long
- 1992: Edward C. Lehman
- 1993: William V. D'Antonio
- 1994: David G. Bromley
- 1995: John H. Simpson
- 1996: Nancy Ammerman
- 1997: R. Stephen Warner
- 1998: James R. Kelly
- 1999: Nancy Nason-Clark
- 2000: José Casanova
- 2001: Anthony J. Blasi
- 2002: Eileen Barker
- 2003: Grace Davie
- 2004: Joseph B. Tamney
- 2005: N. J. Demerath III
- 2006: Kevin J. Christiano
- 2007: James D. Davidson
- 2008: Mary Jo Neitz
- 2009: Michele Dillon
- 2010: Rhys H. Williams
- 2011: Peter Beyer
- 2012: Roger Finke
- 2013: Fred Kniss
- 2014: Christopher G. Ellison
- 2015: Melissa J. Wilde
- 2016: Lori G. Beaman
- 2017: Michael O. Emerson
- 2018: Daniel V.A. Olson
- 2019: Paula Nesbitt
- 2020–2021: James C. Cavendish
- 2022: James Spickard
- 2023: Gerardo Martí
- 2024: Grace Yukich
- 2025: Tricia Bruce

== See also ==
- American Academy of Religion
- International Society for the Sociology of Religion
- Religious Research Association
- Society for the Scientific Study of Religion
