= National Federation of Priests' Councils =

- Abbreviation: NFPC
- Formation: May 20, 1968
- Type: NGO
- Legal status: 501(c)3 nonprofit
- Purpose: "The National Federation of Priests’ Councils serves the communion, brotherhood and solidarity of bishops, presbyterates and priests. "
- Headquarters: Chicago, Illinois, United States
- Region served: United States
- Members: Councils of priests, priest member associations and religious institutes in the United States.
- Main organ: Member councils and associations
- Affiliations: USCCB,

The National Federation of Priests' Councils (NFPC) was an organization representing more than 26,000 Catholic priests in the United States through 125 member councils, associations and religious communities at its peak. The NFPC supported member organizations and priests through collaboration, communication, ongoing formation, research and advocacy. Formed in 1968 soon after the Second Vatican Council, the NFPC was the first national forum for local priests' councils.

== Collaboration ==
The NFPC partnered with religious and lay organizations including the Duke University Center for Excellence in Ministry and the Emerging Models of Pastoral Leadership project. The goal of these collaborations was to research, publish and dialog about contemporary models of pastoral and parish leadership.

== Research ==
The organization sponsored several significant research projects on the priesthood, including:

- Hoge, Dean R. (2002). The First Five Years of the Priesthood: A Study of Newly Ordained Catholic Priests. Collegeville, MN: Liturgical Press. ISBN 978-0-8146-2804-1. Explores the experience of early priesthood based on a survey of recently ordained priests, some active and some who have resigned.
- Hoge, Dean R.; Jacqueline E. Wenger (2003). Evolving Visions of the Priesthood: Changes from Vatican II to the Turn of the New Century. Collegeville, MN: Liturgical Press. ISBN 978-0-8146-2805-8. Analysis of a 2001 national survey of priests, including trends from previous surveys in 1970 and 1993.
- Hoge, Dean R.; Aniedi Okure, OP (2006). International Priests in America: Challenges and Opportunities. Collegeville, MN: Liturgical Press. ISBN 978-0-8146-1830-1. Examines whether the Catholic Church in the United States should bring in more international priests, and if so, how this should be done.
- Daly, William P. (2008). The Laborer is Worthy of His Hire. Chicago, IL: NFPC. A profile of priest compensation including retirement, tax issues and trends.

== Advocacy ==
The NFPC was formed on May 20, 1968. The next day, the new organization made a public statement in support of the Poor People's Campaign that was underway in Washington, DC. The NFPC advocated on issues affecting social justice and priestly life.
