= Donald Eric Capps =

American theologian (1939–2015)

- Born: January 30, 1939; Omaha, Nebraska, U.S.
- Died: August 26, 2015 (aged 76); Trenton, New Jersey, U.S.
- Title: William Harte Felmeth Professor of Pastoral Theology Emeritus
- Spouse: Karen Virginia Docken
- Children: 1

Academic background
- Education: University of Chicago
- Thesis: John Henry Newman: a study of religious leadership (1970)

Academic work
- Discipline: Theology
- Sub-discipline: Psychology of Religion
- Institutions: Princeton Theological Seminary

Donald Eric Capps (January 30, 1939 – August 26, 2015) was an American theologian and William Harte Felmeth Professor of Pastoral Theology at Princeton Theological Seminary. He specialized in the psychology of religion.

== Biography ==
Donald Eric Capps was born in Omaha, Nebraska. After studying at Lewis & Clark College (B.A. 1960) and Yale Divinity School (B.D. 1963, S.T.M. 1965) and University of Chicago (M.A. 1966), he earned his Ph.D. also at the University of Chicago in 1970. His dissertation explored a psycho-historical analysis of the personality of the English theologian John Henry Cardinal Newman, and particularly his vocational struggles.

Capps' academic career started as Instructor at the Department of Religious Studies at the Oregon State University during the spring and summer of 1969. He then became Instructor and Assistant Professor at the Divinity School of the University of Chicago between 1969 and 1974. Later, he was appointed Associate Professor at the Department of Religious Studies of the University of North Carolina at Charlotte, North Carolina where he lectured between 1974 and 1976. Between 1976 and 1981, he was Associate Professor and then Professor at the Graduate Seminary of Phillips University.

In 1981, he joined the faculty of Princeton Theological Seminary, where he was appointed the William Harte Felmeth Professor of Pastoral Theology. In 1989, Uppsala University, Sweden awarded him a degree of Doctor honoris causa in Theology for his contributions to the field of Psychology of Religion.

Other honors include the William F. Bier Award for contribution to Psychology of Religion, granted in 1995 by the Division 36 of the American Psychological Association; the Helen Flanders Dunbar Centennial Award, granted in 2002 by the Columbia-Presbyterian Hospital in New York; and the Joseph A. Sittler Award for Theological Leadership, granted in 2003 by Trinity Lutheran Seminary.

He was the book review editor for the Journal for the Scientific Study of Religion between 1980 and 1983 and editor for the same journal between 1983 and 1988. Furthermore, between 1990 and 1992 he was the president of the Society for the Scientific Study of Religion. He was an ordained minister of the Evangelical Lutheran Church in America beginning in 1972. In May 2009, he retired with the status of Professor emeritus but remained lecturing as adjunct until his death.

Capps died on August 26, 2015, aged 76, in Trenton, New Jersey, as a consequence of injuries suffered in a car crash in Princeton.

== Selected bibliography ==
Capps wrote, co-authored, edited and co-edited dozens of books and journal issues and published more than one hundred chapters, articles, and reviews in books and journals.

=== Books ===
- 100 Years of Happiness: Insights and Findings from the Experts. with Nathan Carlin. Santa Barbara: Praeger. 2012. ISBN 978-1-4408-0363-5.
- Agents of Hope: A Pastoral Psychology. Minneapolis; Eugene: Augsburg Fortress; Wipf & Stock. 2001 [1995]. ISBN 978-1-57910-811-3.
- Biblical Approaches to Pastoral Counseling. Philadelphia; Eugene: Westminster; Wipf & Stock. 2003 [1981]. ISBN 978-0-664-24388-3.
  - Penggunaan Alkitab dalam konseling pastoral [The use of the Bible in pastoral counseling] (in Indonesian). Yogyakarta: Penebit Kanisius. 1999. ISBN 978-979-672-150-4.
- The Child's Song: The Religious Abuse of Children. Louisville: Westminster/John Knox. 1995. ISBN 978-0-664-25554-1.
- Deadly Sins and Saving Virtues. Minneapolis; Eugene: Fortress; Wipf & Stock. 2001 [1987]. ISBN 978-0-8006-1948-0.
  - 대죄와 구원의 덕 [The virtues of sin and salvation for] (in Korean). trans. 김진영 옮김. 서울: 한국장로교출판사. 2008. ISBN 978-89-398-0387-9.
- The Decades of Life: A Guide to Human Development. Louisville: Westminster/John Knox. 2008. ISBN 978-0-664-23241-2.
- The Depleted Self: Sin in a Narcissistic Age. Minneapolis: Fortress. 1992. ISBN 978-0-8006-2587-0.
  - 고갈된 자아의 치유 [Depleted of self healing] (in Korean). trans. 김진영 옮김. 서울: 한국장로교출판사. 2001. ISBN 978-89-398-0375-6.
- The Faith and Friendships of Teenage Boys. with Robert C. Dykstra, and Allan Hugh Cole Jr. Louisville: Westminster John Knox. 2012. ISBN 978-0-664-23340-2.
- Fragile Connections: Memoirs of Mental Illness for Pastoral Care Professionals. St. Louis: Chalice. 2005. ISBN 978-0-8272-2331-8.
- Giving Counsel: A Minister's Guidebook. St. Louis: Chalice. 2001. ISBN 978-0-827212-47-3.
- At Home in the World: A Study in Psychoanalysis, Religion, and Art. Eugene: Cascade. 2013. ISBN 978-1-61097-969-6.
- Jesus: A Psychological Biography. St. Louis; Eugene: Chalice; Wipf & Stock. 2010 [2000]. ISBN 978-0-8272-1713-3.
- Jesus: The Village Psychiatrist. Louisville: Westminster/John Knox. 2008. ISBN 978-0-664-23240-5.
- Laughter Ever After... Ministry of Good Humor. St. Louis: Chalice. 2008. ISBN 978-0-8272-2141-3.
- Life Cycle Theory and Pastoral Care. Minneapolis; Eugene: Fortress; Wipf & Stock. 2002 [1983]. ISBN 978-1-59244-083-2.
- Living in Limbo: Life in the Midst of Uncertainty. with Nathan Carlin. Eugene: Wipf & Stock. 2010. ISBN 978-1-60899-522-6.
- Living Stories: Pastoral Counseling in Congregational Context. Minneapolis: Augsburg Fortress. 1998. ISBN 978-0-8006-3073-7.
  - 鮮活故事: 教會裏的牧養輔導 [Xian story: teach Club Med there Pastor 養 Counseling] (in Chinese). trans. 李金好. 香港 (Hong Kong): 基道出版社. 2005. ISBN 978-962-457-303-9. New Preface
- Losers, Loners, and Rebels: The Spiritual Struggles of Boys. with Robert C. Dykstra, and Allan Hugh Cole, Jr. Louisville: Westminster/John Knox. 2007. ISBN 978-0-664-22961-0.
- Men, Religion, and Melancholia: James, Otto, Jung, Erikson. New Haven: Yale University. 1997. ISBN 978-0-300-06971-6.
- Men and Their Religion: Honor, Hope, and Humor. Harrisburg: Trinity International. 2002. ISBN 978-1-56338-383-0.
- Pastoral Care: A Thematic Approach. Philadelphia; Eugene: Westminster; Wipf & Stock. 2003 [1979]. ISBN 978-0-664-24222-0.
- Pastoral Care and Hermeneutics. Philadelphia; Eugene: Fortress; Wipf & Stock. 2012 [1984]. ISBN 978-1-62032-353-3.
- The Pastoral Care Case: Learning About Care in Congregations. with Gene Fowler. St. Louis; Eugene: Chalice; Wipf & Stock. 2010 [2001]. ISBN 978-0-8272-2964-8.
- Pastoral Counseling and Preaching: A Quest for an Integrated Ministry. Philadelphia; Eugene: Westminster; Wipf & Stock. 2003 [1980]. ISBN 978-1-59244-297-3.
- The Poet's Gift: Toward the Renewal of Pastoral Care. Louisville: Westminster/John Knox. 1993. ISBN 978-0-664-25403-2.
- Reframing: A New Method in Pastoral Care. Minneapolis: Fortress. 1990. ISBN 978-0-8006-2413-2.
  - 易構: 牧養關顧的新方法 [Yi 構: Mu 養 Guan 顧 new method] (in Chinese). trans. 譚偉光. 香港 (Hong Kong): 基道出版社. 2005. ISBN 978-962-457-296-4. New Preface
- Social Phobia: Alleviating Anxiety in an Age of Self-promotion. St. Louis; Eugene: Chalice; Wipf & Stock. 2010 [1999]. ISBN 978-0-8272-3440-6.
- Striking Out: The Religious Journey of Teenage Boys. Eugene: Cascade. 2011. ISBN 978-1-61097-300-7.
- A Time to Laugh: The Religion of Humor. New York: Continuum. 2005. ISBN 978-0-8264-1641-4.
- Understanding Psychosis: Issues and Challenges for Sufferers, Families, and Friends. Lanham: Rowman & Littlefield. 2010. ISBN 978-1-4422-0592-5.
- Young Clergy: A Biographical-Developmental Study. New York: Haworth. 2005. ISBN 978-0-7890-2670-5.
- You've Got to Be Kidding!: How Jokes Can Help You Think. with John M. Capps. Hoboken: John Wiley-Blackwell. 2009. ISBN 978-1-4051-9664-2.

=== Edited books and journal issues ===
- The Biographical Process: Essays in the History and Psychology of Religion. with Frank E. Reynolds. The Hague: Mouton. 1977. ISBN 978-90-279-7522-5.
- Clinical Handbook of Pastoral Counseling. with R. J. Wicks, R. D. Parsons. Mahweh: Paulist Press. 1985. ISBN 978-0-8091-2687-3.
- Encounter with Erikson: Historical Interpretation and Religious Biography. Formative Contemporary Thinkers. Vol. 2. with Walter H. Capps, M. Gerald Bradford. Missoula: Scholars Press. 1977.
- The Endangered Self (Monograph). Vol. 2. with Richard K. Fenn. Princeton: Princeton Theological Seminary. 1992. ISBN 978-1-882380-01-5.
- Freud and Freudians on Religion: A Reader. New Haven: Yale University. 2001. ISBN 978-0-300-08201-2.
- The Hunger of the Heart: Reflections on the Confessions of Augustine (Monograph). Vol. 8. with James E. Dittes. West Lafayette: Society for the Scientific Study of Religion (Purdue University). 1990. ISBN 978-0-932566-07-2.
- Individualism Reconsidered: Readings Bearing on the Endangered Self in Modern Society (Monograph). Vol. 1. with Richard K. Fenn. Princeton: Princeton Theological Seminary. 1992. ISBN 978-1-882380-00-8.
- James and Dewey on Belief and Experience. with John M. Capps. Chicago: University of Illinois. 2005. ISBN 978-0-252-07206-2.
- On Losing the Soul: Essays in the Social Psychology of Religion. with Richard K. Fenn. Albany: SUNY. 1995. ISBN 978-0-7914-2494-0.
- Psychology of Religion: A Guide to Information Sources. with Lewis Rambo, Paul Ransohoff. Detroit: Gale Research. 1976. ISBN 978-0-8103-1356-9.
- Re-calling Ministry. by James E. Dittes. St. Louis: Chalice. 1999. ISBN 978-0-8272-3217-4.
- Religion, Society, and Psychoanalysis: Readings in Contemporary Theory. with Janet Liebman Jacobs. Boulder: Westview. 1997. ISBN 978-0-8133-2648-1.
- The Religious Personality. with Walter H. Capps. Belmont: Wadsworth. 1970.
- "Special Issue: Papers presented at the first annual conference of the Group for New Directions in Pastoral Theology". Pastoral Psychology. 59 (6): 657–842. 2010. ISSN 0031-2789. With Robert C. Dykstra
- "Special Issue: Papers presented at the second annual conference of the Group for New Directions in Pastoral Theology". Pastoral Psychology. 60 (3): 309–489. 2011. ISSN 0031-2789. With Robert C. Dykstra
- Capps, Donald; Dykstra, Robert C. (2003). "Special Issue: Tribute to James E. Dittes". Pastoral Psychology. 52 (1–2): 3–189. doi:10.1023/A:1026078527454. ISSN 0031-2789. With Robert C. Dykstra
- The Struggle for Life: A Companion to William James' The Varieties of Religious Experience (Monograph). Vol. 9. with Janet L. Jacobs. West Lafayette: The Society for the Scientific Study of Religion (Purdue University). 1995. ISBN 978-1-882380-02-2.

=== Selected book chapters and journal articles ===
- Capps, Donald (2007). "Augustine's Confessions: Self-reproach and the Melancholy Self". Pastoral Psychology. 55 (5): 571–591. doi:10.1007/s11089-007-0075-0. ISSN 0031-2789. S2CID 144675145.
- Capps, Donald (2007). "Augustine's Confessions: The Story of a Divided Self and the Process of Its Unification". Pastoral Psychology. 55 (5): 551–569. doi:10.1007/s11089-007-0074-1. ISSN 0031-2789. S2CID 144966318.
- "Dödssynder och narcissistiska jag: ett nytt perspektiv på omvändelsens psykologi" [Deadly Sins and the Narcissistic Self: A New Perspective in the Psychology of Conversion]. Religion och Samhalle (in Swedish). 5 (43). 1989. ISSN 0283-0663. Translation of the doctoral (University of Uppsala) inaugural lecture.
- Donald Capps (2008). "Erik H. Erikson, Norman Rockwell, and the Therapeutic Functions of a Questionable Painting" (PDF). American Imago. 65 (2): 191–228. doi:10.1353/aim.0.0016. ISSN 0065-860X. S2CID 143652149.
- Capps, Donald; Carlin, Nathan Steven (2007). "The Homosexual Tendencies of King James: Should this Matter to Bible Readers Today?". Pastoral Psychology. 55 (6): 551–569. doi:10.1007/s11089-007-0077-y. ISSN 0031-2789. S2CID 143847163. With Nathan Steven Carlin
- Capps, Donald (2010). "Identity with Jesus Christ: The Case of Leon Gabor". Journal of Religion and Health. 49 (4): 560–580. doi:10.1007/s10943-009-9317-z. ISSN 0022-4197. PMID 20041299. S2CID 31276628.
- Capps, Donald (1970). "John Henry Newman: A Study of Vocational Identity". Journal for the Scientific Study of Religion. 9 (1): 33–51. doi:10.2307/1385152. ISSN 0021-8294. JSTOR 1385152.
- Capps, Donald (2011). "John Nash, Game Theory, and the Schizophrenic Brain". Journal of Religion and Health. 50 (1): 145–162. doi:10.1007/s10943-009-9291-5. ISSN 0022-4197. PMID 19862621. S2CID 950736.
- Capps, Donald (1999). "The Lessons of Art Theory for Pastoral Theology". Pastoral Psychology. 47 (5): 321–346. doi:10.1023/A:1021306218981. ISSN 0031-2789. S2CID 140928307.
- Capps, Donald (2010). "The Lessons of Artistic Creativity for Pastoral Theologians". Pastoral Psychology. 59 (3): 249–264. doi:10.1007/s11089-009-0198-6. ISSN 0031-2789. S2CID 143910149.
- Belzen, Jacob A.; Corveleyn, Jozef, eds. (1999). "Melancholy and Motherhate: The Parabolic Fault-line in Erikson's 'Young Man Luther'". Crossing Boundaries in the Psychology of Religion. Åbo (Turku): Åbo Akademi. pp. 27–43. ISBN 978-952-12-0362-6.
- Capps, Donald (2009). "Mental Illness, Religion, and the Rational Mind: The Case of Clifford W. Beers". Mental Health, Religion & Culture. 12 (2): 157–174. doi:10.1080/13674670802398543. ISSN 1367-4676. S2CID 144961693.
- "The Mysterium Tremendum: Its Childhood Origins" (PDF). Psychology of Religion Newsletter. 20 (2): 6–15. 1995. Archived from the original on April 2, 2012. The 1994 William F. Bier Award Address of Division 36 of the American Psychological Association.
- Brown, Sally A.; Miller, Patrick D., eds. (2005). "Nervous Laughter: Lament, Death Anxiety, and Humor". Lament: Reclaiming Practices in Pulpit, Pew, and Public Square. Louisville: Westminster/John Knox. pp. 70–79. ISBN 978-0-664-22750-0.
- Capps, Donald (2009). "Norman Vincent Peale, Smiley Blanton, and the Hidden Energies of the Mind". Journal of Religion and Health. 48 (4): 507–527. doi:10.1007/s10943-009-9258-6. ISSN 0022-4197. PMID 19475512. S2CID 8829687.
- "The Parabolic Event in Religious Autobiography". Princeton Seminary Bulletin. 4 (new) (1): 26–38. 1983. ISSN 0032-8413. Inaugural address at Princeton Theological Seminary.
- Capps, Donald (1978). "Pastoral Care and Psychology of Religion: Toward a New Alliance". Pastoral Psychology. 26 (3): 187–200. doi:10.1007/bf01759741. ISSN 0031-2789. S2CID 144383527.
- Capps, Donald (2009). "Relaxed Bodies, Emancipated Minds, and Dominant Calm". Journal of Religion and Health. 48 (3): 368–380. doi:10.1007/s10943-009-9263-9. ISSN 0022-4197. PMID 19475511. S2CID 29034004.
- Belzen, Jacob A.; Wikström, Owe, eds. (1997). "Shame, Melancholy, and the Introspective Method in Psychology of Religion". Taking a Step Back: Assessments of the Psychology of Religion. Psychologia et Sociologia Religionum. Vol. 13. Uppsala: Acta Universitatis Upsaliensis. pp. 37–54. ISBN 978-91-554-4018-3.
- Childs, Brian H.; Waanders, David W., eds. (1994). "The Soul as the "Coreness" of the Self". The Treasure of Earthen Vessels: Explorations in Theological Anthropology. In Honor of James N. Lapsley. Louisville: Westminster John Knox. pp. 82–104. ISBN 978-0-664-25493-3.
- Capps, Donald (2008). "Was William James a Patient at McLean Hospital for the Mentally Ill?". Pastoral Psychology. 56 (3): 295–320. doi:10.1007/s11089-007-0115-9. ISSN 0031-2789. S2CID 143915877.

=== Secondary resources ===
- Dreyer, Yolanda (2005). "Reflections on Donald Capps' Hermeneutical Model of Pastoral Care". Hervormde Teologiese Studies. 61 (Part 1/2): 109–130. doi:10.4102/hts.v61i1/2.450. hdl:2263/13639. ISSN 0259-9422.
- Dykstra, Robert; Cole Jr., Allan Hugh, eds. (2009). "Special Issue: Tribute to Donald Capps". Pastoral Psychology. 58 (5, 6): 443–693. ISSN 0031-2789.
- Ellens, J. Harold, ed. (2002). "Special Issue: Jesus: A Psychological Biography". Pastoral Psychology. 50 (6): 387–480. ISSN 0031-2789.
- Linhares, Bruno J. (2010). "Dr. Donald E. Capps: Uma breve introdução à sua teologia pastoral. Parte 1 de 2" [Dr. Donald E. Capps: A Brief Introduction to His Pastoral Theology. Part 1 of 2]. Reflexus (in Portuguese). 4 (IV): 37–64. ISSN 1982-0828.
- Linhares, Bruno J. (2011). "Dr. Donald E. Capps: Uma breve introdução à sua teologia pastoral. Parte 2 de 2" [Dr. Donald E. Capps: A Brief Introduction to His Pastoral Theology. Part 2 of 2]. Reflexus (in Portuguese). 5 (V): 27–63. ISSN 1982-0828.
- Nørager, Troels, ed. (1990). Forandrigens mulighed: Essays om sjælesorg og praktisk teologi [Change is a Possibility: Essays on Pastoral and Practical Theology] (in Danish). Frederiksberg: ANIS. ISBN 978-87-7457-102-5. Selection, introduction and translation of previously published book chapters and articles by the editor. Afterword by Donald Capps.
