= Bill McKinney (disambiguation) =

Bill McKinney (1931–2011) was an American character actor.

Bill, Billy or William McKinney may also refer to:

- Bill McKinney (drummer) (1895–1969), American jazz drummer
- Billy McKinney (politician) (1927–2010), American politician in Georgia
- Bill McKinney (footballer) (born 1936), English footballer
- Bill McKinney (American football) (born 1945), American football player
- Billy McKinney (basketball) (born 1955), American basketball player and broadcaster
- Bill McKinney (theologian), American theologian, sociologist and minister, president of the Pacific School of Religion
- Billy McKinney (baseball) (born 1994), American baseball player
