= Institute for Policy Research and Catholic Studies =

US research center

- Motto: In Service to Church, Nation, and World
- Established: 1974
- Director: David P. Long
- Formerly called: Boys Town Center for the Study of Youth Development (1974-1982); Life Cycle Institute (1982-2009)
- Location: The Catholic University of America, Washington, DC, USA
- Coordinates: 38°56′5″N 76°59′58″W
- Interactive map of Institute for Policy Research and Catholic Studies
- Website: https://ipr.catholic.edu

The Institute for Policy Research and Catholic Studies (IPR) is an interdisciplinary institute and research center at The Catholic University of America in Washington, DC.

== History ==
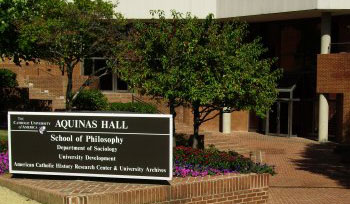
Aquinas Hall was the original home of the Life Cycle Institute. It now houses the School of Philosophy as well as The American Catholic History Research Center and University Archives.

The Institute for Policy Research and Catholic Studies has its roots in the Boys Town Center for the Study of Youth Development. In 1972, Boys Town had been found to be sitting on funds of nearly $300 million while serving only 200 residents in its Catholic-run home for wayward boys in Omaha, Nebraska. In response to the scandal, the Boys Town board of trustees agreed to widen the organization's mission to include research on youth development. From 1974 to 1982, Boys Town funding supported graduate students, post-doctoral fellows, research stipends, support staff, a new building (now Aquinas Hall) and tremendous growth in the National Catholic School of Social Service, the School of Theology and Religious Studies, and the departments of Anthropology, Human Development, and Sociology in the School of Arts and Sciences.

In 1982, the Boys Town board ended its contract with the university, leaving the Center in need of funding and a new vision. It expanded its focus to include human development across the entire life span, as well as research on social movements, and changed its name to The Life Cycle Institute. A number of tough years followed which saw researchers and professors forced to leave for better opportunities, although directors Che Fu Lee, Hans Furth, and James Youniss worked to develop LCI into a center known for its empirical research on community, youth, and political demographics. Eventually, LCI emerged as The Catholic University of America's original internal think tank.

McMahon Hall served as the home of the institute through 2024. The second-oldest building on campus and built in 1895, McMahon Hall houses the Office of the Provost and the office of Dean of the School of Arts and Sciences.

Renamed the Institute for Policy Research and Catholic Studies in 2009, the think tank continues to bring rigorous academic research to bear on contemporary questions of interest to policy experts and faith communities.

== Mission ==
The Institute for Policy Research and Catholic Studies now serves as an interdisciplinary policy research center that provides timely analysis of policy issues relevant to the life of the Church, the Catholic University of America, legislators, scholars, professionals, and concerned citizens, including the media. IPR also provides an interdisciplinary forum that welcomes and encourages participation and active collaboration among scholars, professionals, and experts from a variety of disciplines, institutions, and faith traditions.

The Institute's lectures, conferences, symposia, round-tables, and working groups provide research that supports print and electronic publications, multimedia, and other means to share research with the public, the Church, policymakers, media, and interested scholars.

== Current Work of the Institute ==
The Institute for Policy Research and Catholic Studies organizes, facilitates, and sponsors policy analysis, empirical research, and publications focused on both the public and private-sectors. It has organized hundreds of symposia, conferences, round-tables, debates, lectures, and publications designed to bring rigorous academic research to bear on contemporary questions that lie at the intersection of law, religion, and policy, including through close collaboration with lawmakers, policymakers, and stakeholders in the greater Washington, DC area.

The Institute is currently divided into working groups where each IPR Fellow, scholar, or associated professional agrees to collaborate with his or her colleagues to complete a policy research project and to disseminate its results to interested members of the community. Current working groups are focused on the areas:

- Human Rights as they relate to the work of Eastern Christian communities, the problems of genocide, human trafficking, the challenges to privacy, the place of religion in the public square, and restorative justice.
- Professional Ethics, specifically as it relates to the Catholic Church in crisis.
- Foreign Affairs, including national security and intelligence, permanent neutrality and its role in international peace, security, and justice, and the current challenges of disinformation and asymmetrical warfare.
- Integral Human Development and issues surrounding community renewal, fetal alcohol syndrome, and mental health policies at the local, state, national, and international levels.

Recent work at IPR has focused on current events and political discourse, including discussions on the early stages of the Biden administration and the situation in Haiti after the August 2021 earthquake.

On March 27, 2023, IPR sponsored and hosted a conference on the Nuremberg Principles and contemporary challenges to them. This conference, held in partnership with the International Research and Documentation Center for War Crimes Trials at the Philipps-University Marburg, the Federal Ministry of Justice of the Federal Republic of Germany, the Embassy of the Federal Republic of Germany in Washington, D.C., the International Nuremberg Principles Academy, and Case Western Reserve University School of Law, brought together lawyers, historians, theologians, and human rights activists from around the world to discuss the applicability of the Nuremberg Principles in protecting human dignity, promoting human rights, and enforcing international criminal law in the context of today. At the beginning of the conference, the last surviving Nuremberg trail attorney, Benjamin Ferencz, offered words of welcome to the participants. It would be his last public appearance (via video) before his death the next month. The conference proceedings have been since published on the conference website.

== The Keane Medallion ==
The Keane Medallion as presented in 2016

Between 2011 and 2017, the Institute presented the Bishop John Joseph Keane Medallion as part of its yearly fundraising banquet.

The medallion was named in honor of John Joseph Keane, the first rector of The Catholic University of America who was instrumental in locating the University in Washington, DC. The Medallion was crafted to honor individuals for lifetime service reflecting the vision of the Institute. The Latin inscription reads: Academia, Patria, Ecclesia.

Keane Medallion Winners

- 2017: Ralph McCloud, Director of the Catholic Campaign for Human Development, United States Conference of Catholic Bishops
- 2016: Dr. Carolyn Woo, President and CEO, Catholic Relief Services
- 2015: Mary Ann Glendon, former United States Ambassador to the Holy See
- 2014: Cardinal Theodore E. McCarrick, Archbishop Emeritus of Washington
- 2013: Reverend Monsignor John Enzler, President, Catholic Charities of the Archdiocese of Washington
- 2012: Timothy J. May, Esq. Trustee Emeritus of Catholic University of America
- 2011: Thomas P. Melady, Former United States Ambassador to the Holy See

== Prominent IPR Fellows ==
- Chen Guangcheng, Chinese civil rights activist
- William D'Antonio, sociologist and educator
- Fr. Eugene Hemrick, noted weekly nationally syndicated columnist for Catholic News Service
- George McLean, founding president of The Council for Research in Values and Philosophy and general editor of its 300 volume publication series, "Cultural Heritage and Contemporary Change"
- Msgr. Stephen Rossetti, American Catholic priest, author, educator, licensed psychologist and expert on psychological and spiritual wellness issues for Catholic priests
- John Zogby, American public opinion pollster, author, public speaker, and founder of the Zogby International Poll

== Directors of the Institute ==
- James O'Connor, Ph.D., Department of Psychology, School of Arts and Sciences (1974–1982)
- Che Fu Lee, Ph.D., Department of Sociology, School of Arts and Sciences (1982–1988)
- Hans G. Furth, Ph.D., Department of Psychology, School of Arts and Sciences (1988)
- James Youniss, Ph.D. Department of Psychology, School of Arts and Sciences (1988–2000)
- Dean Hoge, Ph.D. Department of Sociology, School of Arts and Sciences (2000–2004)
- John K. White, Ph.D. Department of Politics, School of Arts and Sciences (2004–2005)
- Stephen F. Schneck, Ph.D., Department of Politics, School of Arts and Sciences (2005–2015)
- Maria Mazzenga, Ph.D., Education Archivist, American Catholic History Research Center and University Archives (2015–2017)
- Robert Destro, J.D., The Columbus School of Law (2017–2019)
- David P. Long, S.T.L., M.Phil., J.C.D., Dean of the School of Professional Studies and Assistant Professor, School of Canon Law (2019–present)
