= Sandra Morgen =

American anthropologist

- Born: Sandra Lynn Morgen; March 31, 1950; Cleveland, Ohio
- Died: September 27, 2016 (aged 66); Eugene, Oregon, U.S.
- Education: University of North Carolina, University of Texas
- Scientific career
- Fields: Feminist anthropology
- Workplaces: University of Oregon

Sandra Lynn Morgen (March 31, 1950 – September 27, 2016) was an American feminist anthropologist. At the end of her career, she was a professor of anthropology at the University of Oregon, and previously served as vice provost for graduate studies and associate dean of the Graduate School, and director of the University of Oregon Center for the Study of Women in Society.

She was both known for her work on women's role in academic anthropology and pedagogy, and was an academic anthropologist. Her research on women's relation to the state, both in terms of tax reform and the women's health movement, has influenced the directions taken by feminist activists on issues such as welfare and reproductive rights.

== Education ==
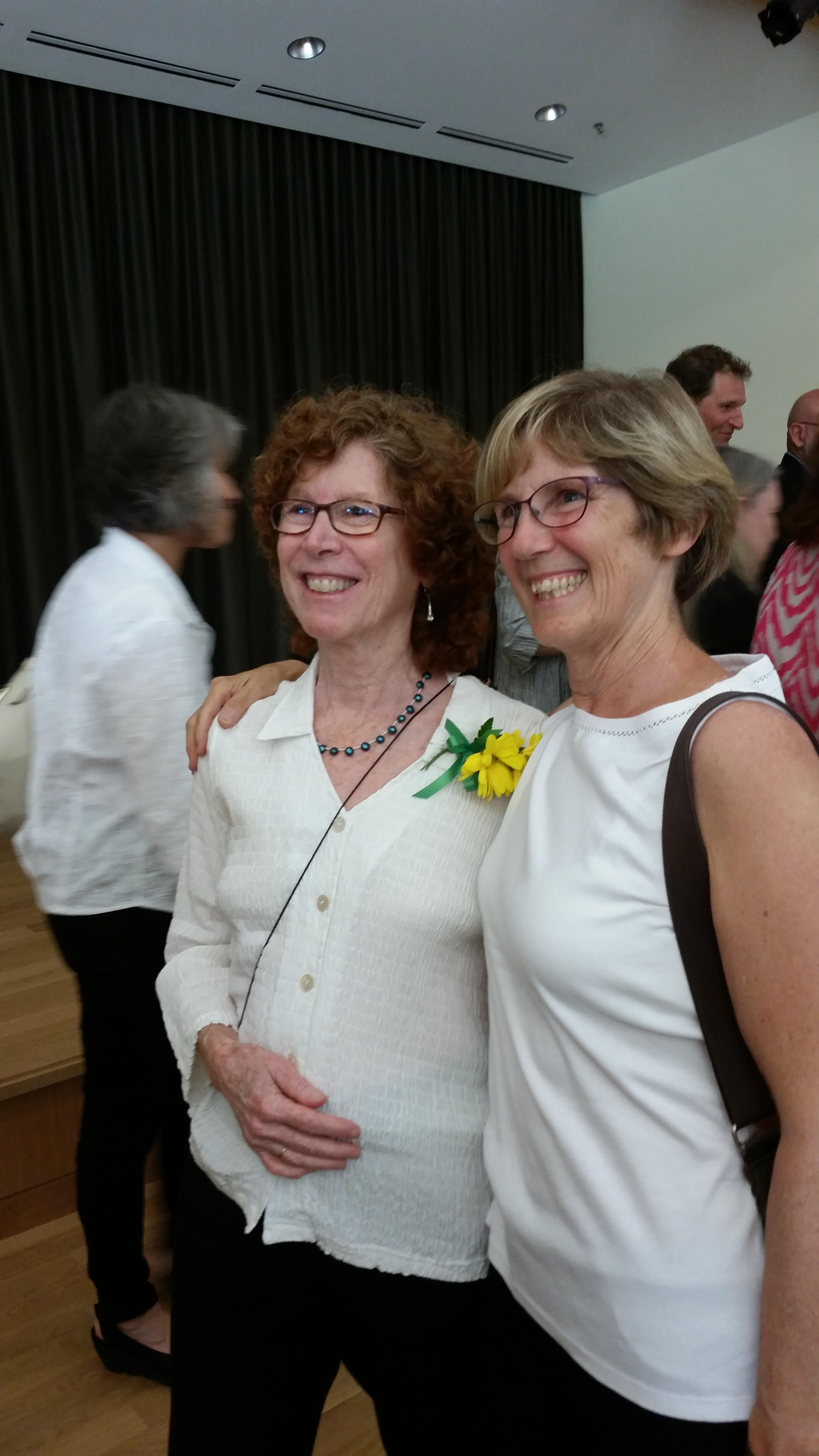
Sandra Morgen (left) pictured with friend after receiving the University of Oregon Research Faculty Excellence Award for Outstanding Research Career

Morgen received her PhD from the University of North Carolina at Chapel Hill in 1982, where she wrote her dissertation on a group of smaller Women's Health clinics that served women of color and poor and working-class women. While at UNC Chapel Hill, she was an active member of a socialist feminist group.

== Work ==
Morgen's work includes two books, Stretched Thin: Poor Families, Welfare Work and Welfare Reform, and Into Our Own Hands: The Women's Health Movement in the United States, 1969-1990. Stretched Thin, co-authored with Joan Acker and Jill Weigt in 2009, discusses the effect of welfare reform on poor families in Oregon. Morgen, Acker and Weight argue that neoliberal welfare reform, particularly the doctrine of "personal responsibility", has challenged the economic survival of poor families in the state. In a review of the book in Contemporary Sociology: A Journal of Reviews, Judith Lorber writes that "Stretched Thin not only provides a powerful feminist critique of neoliberalism and conservative understandings of "family values," but importantly reminds us of the multiple perspectives in welfare reform from social workers and administrators to recipients of them."

Into Our Own Hands discusses the Women's health movement in the United States, particularly the evolution of what Morgen posits was initially a movement composed of white middle class women into a movement championed by working-class women, lesbians and women of colour. This, she argues, left female physicians in a precarious position: they did not want to betray the medical profession which had only recently admitted women to its ranks, while also not wanting to betray other women by providing or allowing substandard care. Writing in the National Women's Studies Association Journal, Tanfr Emin-Tunc states that "[b]y placing the women's health movement in its proper historical and sociological contexts, this work ... sheds a ray of light on the current problems in women's health care, such as the continuing racism, homophobia, and classism fostered by a system that does not provide universal coverage".

== Awards ==
Morgen received the Career Award for Outstanding Contributions to the Field of Anthropology of the U.S. from the Society for the Anthropology of North America in 2003, and the University of Oregon Research Faculty Excellence Award for Outstanding Research Career in 2015. She was recognized for her activist and political work on gender and racial inclusivity in the American Anthropological Association, receiving the Squeaky Wheel award from the Committee on the Status of Women in Anthropology and the Committee on Gender Equity in Anthropology in 2006. Her book Into Our Own Hands: The Women's Health Movement in the United States, 1969-1990, which was based on her dissertation, received the Eileen Basker Memorial Prize for a significant contribution to scholarship on gender and health from the Society for Medical Anthropology.

== Impact ==
In November 2016, the Society for the Anthropology of North America hosted a memorial panel entitled, "Intersections, Policies, and Politics: Exploring The Influence of Sandra Morgen."

== Death ==
Morgen died on September 27, 2016, aged 66, from ovarian cancer.

== Bibliography ==
=== Books ===
- Morgen, Sandra (1986). To see ourselves, to see our sisters: the challenge of re-envisioning curriculum change. Memphis: Center for Research on Women. OCLC 17305765.
- Morgen, Sandra; Bookman, Ann (1988). Women and the politics of empowerment. Philadelphia: Temple University Press. ISBN 9780877225256.
- Morgen, Sandra (1989). Gender and anthropology: critical reviews for research and teaching. Washington, D.C.: American Anthropological Association. ISBN 9780913167335.
- Morgen, Sandra; Tuana, Nancy (2001). Engendering rationalities. Albany: State University of New York Press. ISBN 9780791450864.
- Morgen, Sandra (2002). Into our own hands: the women's health movement in the United States, 1969-1990. New Brunswick, New Jersey: Rutgers University Press. ISBN 9780813530710.
- Morgen, Sandra; Abramovitz, Mimi (2006). Taxes are a woman's issue: reframing the debate. New York, New York: Feminist Press at the City University of New York. ISBN 9781558615229.
- Morgen, Sandra; Sutton, Barbara; Novkov, Julie (2008). Security disarmed critical perspectives on gender, race, and militarization. New Brunswick, New Jersey: Rutgers University Press. ISBN 9780813543604.
- Morgen, Sandra; Acker, Joan; Weigt, Jill (2010). Stretched thin poor families, welfare work, and welfare reform. Ithaca: Cornell University Press. ISBN 9780801475108.
