= David P. Long =

Academic and Canon Lawyer (born 1975)

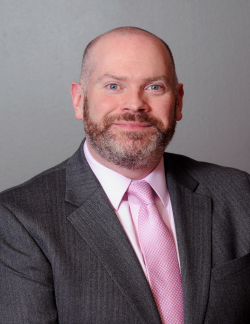
- Born: September 11, 1975 (age 51); Paterson, New Jersey, United States of America
- Education: Georgetown University; Katholieke Universiteit Leuven; The Catholic University of America
- Occupations: Canonist, Professor, Dean

David Patrick Long (born September 11, 1975) is an American Roman Catholic canonist, professor, and academic administrator. He currently serves as dean of the School of Professional Studies, assistant professor in canon law, and director of the Institute for Policy Research and Catholic Studies at The Catholic University of America in Washington, DC.

== Early life and education ==
David Long was born in Paterson, New Jersey and raised in Elmwood Park, New Jersey before moving with his family to Paterson at the age of 9. He attended Saint Anne School in Fair Lawn, New Jersey and Bergen Catholic High School in Oradell, New Jersey. After his high school graduation, Long enrolled at Georgetown University in Washington, DC, where he was a double-major in History and American Government. He graduated from Georgetown in May 1997.

== Graduate studies ==
After a year of post-undergraduate studies in philosophy, Long enrolled as a graduate student at the Katholieke Universiteit Leuven (1998–2003), where he obtained his master's degree in religious studies (2001), master's degree in theology (2002), licentiate of sacred theology (2002), and licentiate of canon law (2003). During his time at KU Leuven, Long was on the editorial staff of Louvain Studies and the European Journal for Church and State Research.

Long began advanced studies at The Catholic University of America School of Theology and Religious Studies in the fall of 2012, eventually earning a master of philosophy degree in 2015. He later studied at The Catholic University of America School of Canon Law, where he earned his doctorate in canon law, defending his dissertation entitled John Henry Newman, Doctrinal Development, and the Canonical Status of the Theologian in the Church in April 2022.

== Professional career ==
Prior to his studies at The Catholic University of America, Long taught at the high school level at two institutions in northern New Jersey: Saint Dominic Academy in Jersey City and Immaculate Heart Academy in the Township of Washington, and was an assistant professor in religious studies at Felician University.

While pursuing his studies in theology and canon law, Long worked in the university's graduate studies office from 2012 through 2019, rising to the position of associate dean of graduate studies before becoming assistant provost in June 2019. He was later promoted to vice provost for academic operations and strategic planning in 2022. In that capacity, he served as chief of academic operations for the university and assisted the provost and school deans in developing and executing capital plans for the academic area.

In March 2024, Catholic University of America president Peter Kilpatrick announced that Long would succeed Dr. Vincent Kiernan as the dean of the Metropolitan School of Professional Studies on June 1, 2024. Kiernan had been dean since June 2016.

As dean of the School of Professional Studies, Long oversees a school that offers five associate degrees, five bachelors degrees, three masters degrees, and various certificate programs. He is also responsible for summer sessions at Catholic University, as well as overseeing the Catholic University of America Tucson project, where Catholic University offers the Bachelor of Arts degree in Management and Bachelor of Arts degree in Interdisciplinary Studies in partnership with Pima Community College in Tucson, Arizona.

Long is a member of numerous academic and professional organizations, including the American Academy of Religion, the Canon Law Society of America, the Canon Law Society of Great Britain and Ireland, the Catholic Theological Society of America, the College Theology Society, the Eastern Regional Conference of Canonists, the Fellowship of Catholic Scholars, and the Saint John Henry Newman Association of America, of which he has been a member of the Board of Directors since 2023.

He is an expert in the teaching office of the Catholic Church, the governance of Catholic colleges and universities, the writings of Saint John Henry Newman, doctrinal development, and papal infallibility. He has been published in The Jurist, Dicionário de Espiritualidade e Mística, The Catholic Historical Review, The Heythrop Journal, Ecclesiology, and Newman Studies Journal, and has given presentations on Saint John Henry Newman and Saint Augustine of Hippo at various academic conferences.

== Select publications ==
- "Defining Schism in the External Forum (c. 751)." The Jurist: Studies in Church Law and Ministry, Volume 82, Number 1 (2026), 91–123.
- Newman, Canon Law, and Development: Quarrying Granite Rocks with Razors (Washington, DC: CUA Press, 2025; ISBN 978-0-8132-3892-0)
- "A Guide to John Henry Newman: His Life and Thought ed. by Juan R. Vélez." The Catholic Historical Review 109:4 (Autumn 2023), 811–812.
- "John Henry Newman, Infallibility, and the Development of Christian Doctrine." The Heythrop Journal 58:2 (March 2017), 181–194.
- "Eucharistic Ecclesiology and Excommunication: A Critical Investigation of the Meaning and Praxis of Exclusion from the Sacrament of the Eucharist." Ecclesiology 10:2 (2014), 205–228.
- "John Henry Newman and the Consultation of the Faithful." Newman Studies Journal 10:2 (Fall 2013), 18–31.

== Personal life ==
Long is married to Megan, and the couple has two sons.
