= Miriam M. Johnson =

American sociologist

Miriam M. Johnson Professor emerita
- Born: Miriam Massey; January 12, 1928; Atlanta, Georgia
- Died: November 21, 2007 (aged 79); Eugene, Oregon
- Occupation: Sociologist
- Spouse: Benton Johnson
- Children: Shannon, Rebekah
- Parent(s): Leola P. and Herbert N. Massey

Academic background
- Thesis: Instrumental and expressive components in the personalities of women (1955)
- Doctoral advisor: Talcott Parsons

Miriam M. Johnson (January 12, 1928 – November 21, 2007) was an American sociologist and professor emerita of the University of Oregon's Sociology Department.

== Life ==
Miriam Johnson was born Miriam Massey in Atlanta, Georgia, on January 12, 1928, to Leola and Herbert Massey. While attending the University of North Carolina, Chapel Hill, she met Benton Johnson. They were married in 1951. In 1955 they had a son (Shannon), followed by a daughter (Rebekah) in 1957. Johnson died on November 21, 2007, in Eugene, Oregon, at the age of 79 of lung cancer after a short illness.

== Career ==
Johnson was educated at Georgia State College for Women at Milledgeville, and the University of North Carolina, Chapel Hill, where she studied sociology and met her husband Benton Johnson. In 1948 she pursued graduate studies at Radcliffe College with advisor Talcott Parsons in Harvard University's Department of Social Relations, earning a PhD. in 1955.

She taught at the Women's College of the University of North Carolina (now the University of North Carolina at Greensboro) until 1953. Johnson and her husband moved to Oregon in 1957, when he joined the University of Oregon faculty. She returned to sociological work in 1972, with a particular emphasis on gender and family roles. In 1973, she helped organize the University of Oregon's Center for the Study of Women in Society, and later served as its director. Her last book, Strong Mothers, Weak Wives, was published in 1988.

== See also ==
- List of sociologists
