= Joan Acker =

American sociologist (1924-2016

- Born: Joan Elise Robinson; March 18, 1924; Illinois, United States
- Died: June 22, 2016 (aged 92)
- Known for: gendered organizations, gender inequality as institutionalized
- Spouse: Martin Acker (m. 1948; div. 1967)

Academic background
- Education: University of Oregon
- Influences: Dorothy E. Smith, Heidi Hartmann, Rosabeth Moss Kanter

Academic work
- Discipline: Sociology, organizational studies
- Main interests: Feminism, race, class, gender

Joan Elise Robinson Acker (March 18, 1924 – June 22, 2016) was an American sociologist, researcher, writer and educator. She joined the University of Oregon faculty in 1967. Acker is considered one of the leading analysts regarding gender and class within the second wave of feminism.

== Education ==
Acker was born in Illinois in 1924. She received her bachelor's degree from Hunter College, her master's from the University of Chicago, and her Ph.D. from the University of Oregon.

== Career ==
Acker is best known for her theories on the relationship between race, class, and gender. She discusses this relationship in several of her publications, including her 2006 book Class Questions: Feminist Answers. Acker describes the need to think about race, class, and gender not as separate entities but as "intersecting systems of oppression".

Acker was professor of sociology at the University of Oregon until her retirement in 1993. In 1973, Acker founded the Center for the Study of Women in Society at the University of Oregon. She was also professor at The Swedish Center for Working Life. She successfully helped to raise pay wages for low-wage jobs in Oregon while serving on a state task force from 1981 to 1983. She also served as co-editor of the academic journals Gender & Society and Gender, Organisation and Work. In recognition of her scholarship, Acker received the American Sociological Association's Career of Distinguished Scholarship Award in 1993 and the Jessie Bernard Award for feminist scholarship in 1989.

== Later life and legacy ==
She died on June 22, 2016, at the age of 92.

== Selected works ==
=== Books ===
- Acker, Joan; et al. (1980). Research in the interweave of social roles. Greenwich, Connecticut: JAI Press, Inc. ISBN 9780892321919.
- Acker, Joan (1989). Doing comparable worth: gender, class, and pay equity. Philadelphia: Temple University Press. ISBN 9780877226215.
- Acker, Joan (2006). Class questions: feminist answers. Lanham, Maryland: Rowman & Littlefield Publishers. ISBN 9780742546301.
- Acker, Joan; Morgen, Sandra; Weigt, Jill (2010). Stretched thin poor families, welfare work, and welfare reform. Ithaca: Cornell University Press. ISBN 9780801475108.

=== Chapters in books ===
- Acker, Joan (2006), "Women and social stratification: a case of intellectual sexism", in Levine, Rhonda (ed.), Social class and stratification: classic statements and theoretical debates (2nd ed.), Lanham, Maryland: Rowman & Littlefield Publishers, pp. 171–182, ISBN 9780742546325

=== Journal articles ===
- Acker, Joan (1990). "Hierarchies, Jobs, Bodies: A Theory of Gendered Organizations". Gender and Society. 4 (2): 139–158. ISSN 0891–2432.
- Acker, Joan (2006-08-01). "Inequality Regimes: Gender, Class, and Race in Organizations". Gender & Society. 20 (4): 441–464. doi:10.1177/0891243206289499. ISSN 0891–2432.
