= Christopher Ellison (sociologist) =

American sociologist

- Born: Christopher Gaillard Ellison; October 15, 1960 (age 65); Charlotte, North Carolina, US

Academic background
- Education: Duke University
- Thesis: Bringing Religion Back In (1991)
- Doctoral advisor: Edward A. Tiryakian

Academic work
- Discipline: Sociology
- Sub-discipline: Sociology of religion
- Institutions: University of Texas at Austin; University of Texas at San Antonio

Christopher Gaillard Ellison (born October 15, 1960) is an American sociologist specializing in the sociology of religion. He is Dean's Distinguished Professor in the Department of Sociology at the University of Texas at San Antonio, where he has taught since 2010. Previously, he spent nineteen years on the faculty of the University of Texas at Austin. He has served as president of the Southern Sociological Society and the Association for the Sociology of Religion. In 1999, he received the Exemplary Paper in Humility Theology Award from the John Templeton Foundation, and in 2004, he was named an ISI Highly Cited Researcher.
