= Society for the Scientific Study of Religion =

Religious studies organization

- SSSR was founded at Harvard University in 1949 as the Committee for the Social Scientific Study of Religion
- Abbreviation: SSSR
- Formation: 1949; 77 years ago
- Type: Learned society
- President: Ruth Braunstein
- Website: sssreligion.org
- Formerly called: Committee for the Social Scientific Study of Religion; Committee for the Scientific Study of Religion

The Society for the Scientific Study of Religion (was founded at Harvard University in 1949) was formed to advance research in the social scientific perspective on religious institutions and experiences. The Journal for the Scientific Study of Religion is published by the society to provide a forum for empirical papers in the topic area. On the society's home page, it is clear that they promote interdisciplinary dialogue and collaboration - with organizations etc. - carried out by prominent members. (See Hoesly and nondenominationals, for example, as gleaned from the references — one of Hoesly's texts: “‘Need a Minister? [...]").

== Presidents ==
- 1954–1955: Prentiss Pemberton
- 1955–1956: Horace Kallen
- Richard McCann
- 1959: James Luther Adams
- 1961: Horace Kallen
- 1962–1963: Horace L. Friess
- 1966–1967: Peter L. Berger
- 1967–1968: Charles Y. Glock
- 1970–1971: Joseph H. Fichter
- c. 1971 – c. 1973: James E. Dittes
- 1978–1979: William V. D'Antonio
- 1980–1981: Guy Benton Johnson
- 1983–1984: Jeffrey K. Hadden
- 1985: Phillip E. Hammond
- 1988–1989: Meredith B. McGuire
- Donald Eric Capps
- 1993: Eileen Barker
- 1996–1997: Wade Clark Roof
- 1998–1999: Nicholas Jay Demerath III
- 2000-2001: Robert Wuthnow
- Michele Dillon
- 2009: Mark Chaves
- 2011: James A. Beckford
- 2012: Rhys H. Williams
- 2014: James T. Richardson
- 2014–2015: Fenggang Yang
- 2018: Korie Little Edwards
- 2019: Elaine Howard Ecklund
- 2020: Laura Olson
- 2021: Prema Kurien
- 2022: R. Khari Brown
- 2023: Kraig Beyerlein
- 2024: Gerardo Martí

== See also ==
- American Academy of Religion
- Association for the Social Scientific Study of Jewry
- Association for the Sociology of Religion
- Canadian Society for the Study of Religion
- Psychology of religion
- Religious Research Association
- Religious studies
- Sociology of religion
