= Mimi Abramovitz =

American author, educator and activist

- Born: 1941 (age 84–85)
- Education: University of Michigan
- Occupations: Author, educator, social worker

Mimi Abramovitz is an American author, educator and activist. Abramovitz's work focuses on civil and welfare rights of those living in the United States, especially women.

== Education ==
Abramovitz completed her undergraduate work at the University of Michigan, where she earned a B.A. in sociology in 1963. She went on to obtain her master's degree in social work in 1967 and her Ph.D. in social work from Columbia University in 1981.

== Career ==
Abramovitz moved to New Haven, Connecticut, where she became active in an existing organization and went on co-found other organizations. She became active in the American Independent Movement, an organization who summarizes their goal, "The American Independent Movement (AIM) has been working since 1966 to get people together against the rich, powerful few who run New Haven and the whole country". She'd also go on, while in New Haven, to co-found with other women, New Haven Women's Liberation, an organization that allowed her to focus on welfare rights, organize anti-war rallies in Washington, D.C., and the unionization of Yale University clerical workers. Abramovitz would begin to teach social welfare policy at the Hunter College.

Abramovitz, along with Jan Poppendeick and Melinda Lackey created a course at Hunter College called the Community Leadership course, which consists of both education about the history of activism and training in relevant skills. Then students use these skills in the community, aided by a student organization, the Welfare Rights Initiative(WRI), which was also co-founded by an Abramovitz, Poppendeick, and Lackey. The WRI describes itself as a "grassroots student activist and community leadership training organization" whose mission is to train and support "students who have firsthand experience of poverty to effectively promote access to education for all".

Abramovitz serves as the Bertha Capen Reynolds Professor of Social Policy and as the department chair Social Welfare Policy at Hunter College School of Social Work

== Awards and honors ==
- Outstanding Book award (1977) by the Gustavus Myers Center For the Study of Human Rights, for her book Under Attack, Fighting Back: Women and Welfare in the United States.
- Feminist Scholarship Award (2004) by the Council on Social Work Education (CSWE).
- Distinguished Recent Contributions in Social Work Education Award (2004) awarded by the Council on Social Work Education (CSWE)
- Inducted as a fellow of the American Academy of Social Work and Social Welfare (2015)

== Bibliography ==
=== Books ===
- Abramovitz, Mimi (1996). Regulating the lives of women: social welfare policy from colonial times to the present. Boston, Massachusetts: South End Press. ISBN 9780896085510.
- Abramovitz, Mimi (2000). Under attack, fighting back: women and welfare in the United States. New York: Monthly Review Press. ISBN 9781583670088.
- Abramovitz, Mimi; Morgen, Sandra (2006). Taxes are a woman's issue: reframing the debate. New York, New York: Feminist Press at the City University of New York. ISBN 9781558615229.
- Abramovitz, Mimi; Blau, Joel (2007). The dynamics of social welfare policy. Oxford New York: Oxford University Press. ISBN 9780195311709.

=== Chapters in books ===
- Abramovitz, Mimi (2011), "The U.S. welfare state: a battleground for human rights", in Hertel, Shareen; Libal, Kathryn (eds.), Human rights in the United States : beyond exceptionalism, Cambridge New York: Cambridge University Press, pp. 46–67, ISBN 9781107400870.

=== Journal articles ===
- Acker, Joan (July 1986). "The privatization of the welfare state: a review". Social Work. 31 (4): 257–264. doi:10.1093/sw/31.4.257. PMID 10300978.
- Acker, Joan (1993). "Should all social work students be educated for social change? Pro". Journal of Social Work Education. 29 (1): 6–11. doi:10.1080/10437797.1993.10778794.
- Acker, Joan (November 1998). "Social work and social reform: an arena of struggle". Social Work. 43 (6): 512–526. doi:10.1093/sw/43.6.512.
- Acker, Joan (October 2001). "Everyone is still on welfare: the role of redistribution in social policy". Social Work. 46 (4): 297–308. doi:10.1093/sw/46.4.297. PMID 11682971.
- Acker, Joan (April 2005). "The largely untold story of welfare reform and the human services". Social Work. 50 (2): 175–186. doi:10.1093/sw/50.2.175. PMID 15853194.
- Acker, Joan (May 2006). "Welfare reform in the United States: gender, race and class matter". Critical Social Policy. 26 (2): 336–364. doi:10.1177/0261018306062589. S2CID 144670870.
