= Review of Religious Research =

Journal

- Discipline: Sociology of religion
- Language: English
- Edited by: Adair Lummis

Publication details
- History: 1959–present
- Publisher: Religious Research Association
- Frequency: Quarterly
- Impact factor: 0.981 (2018)

Standard abbreviations
- ISO 4: Rev. Relig. Res.

Indexing
- ISSN: 0034-673X (print); 2211-4866 (web)
- JSTOR: revirelirese
- OCLC no.: 1018815

Links
- Journal homepage

The Review of Religious Research is a quarterly journal that reviews the various methods, findings and uses of religious research. It contains a variety of articles, book reviews and reports on research projects. It is published by the Religious Research Association and was founded in 1959. According to the Journal Citation Reports, the journal has a 2018 impact factor of 0.981, ranking it 100 out of 148 journals in the category "Sociology" (5-year impact factor was 0.616 in 2015).
