= David O. Moberg =

American sociologist (1922–2023)

David Oscar Moberg (February 13, 1922 – September 6, 2023) was an American Christian scholar, who was Emeritus Professor of Sociology at Marquette University. His areas of specialization included methodology in qualitative research, sociology of religion, sociology of American evangelicals, ageing and religion (gerontology).

== Early life and education ==
Moberg was born in Montevideo, Minnesota on 13, February 1922 to Fred L. Moberg and Anna E. Moberg (née Sundberg).. He served in the U.S. Army from 1942 to 1945. He was raised as a Christian and after World War Two he served as a pastor of a Baptist church. He graduated with a BA degree from Seattle Pacific University (1947), received an MA from the University of Washington (1949) and a PhD from the University of Minnesota (1952).

== Career ==
Moberg taught sociology for nineteen years at Bethel College, St. Paul Minnesota and in 1968 was appointed Professor of Sociology at Marquette University until he retired in 1991. He founded the Association for the Development of Religious Information Systems (ADRIS), an organization dedicated to promoting a global network of religious information exchange. From 1962 to 1964 he served as the editor of the Journal of the American Scientific Affiliation. He has also been president of the Association for the Sociology of Religion, the Religious Research Association and the Wisconsin Sociological Association.

During the 1950s he wrote various academic articles that studied the role of religion and particularly of Christianity in the lives of aged persons. Moberg spent time as a Fulbright professor in the Netherlands and discussed sociological aspects of Dutch religious activities and Dutch society in the early 1960s. The 1960s witnessed the publication of his co-written book with Robert Gray The Church and the Older Person (1962). This book was based on the PhD research of both authors, and charted the sociological function of religion in the lives of older people. The book included a sociological survey of some 200 persons living in seven aged care facilities in Minneapolis and St. Paul, and interviews with older persons who participated in the activities of two large Chicago-area churches. Several of Moberg's later publications have concentrated the use of sociological studies into the role of religion in the lives of older persons in urban America, as well as the implications of the aging process upon the function of Protestant clergy and the need for theological curricula to include practical study in gerontology. In the 1970s and 1980s, he played a major role in developing the National Interfaith Coalition on Aging. His literary output in the sociology of aged persons prompted James Seeber to describe Moberg as the "godfather of the religion and aging research field."

Besides his contributions to the study of gerontology, Moberg also published works about the sociology of American religion, with a strong emphasis on the function of Protestant churches in American life. His first major study in this regard came in 1962 with the first edition of his textbook on the sociology of American church life The Church as A Social Institution (1962). This textbook was revised in the 1980s. This textbook synthesized research data regarding the demographics of religious affiliation for Roman Catholics, Protestants and Jews, and the effects that churches have both intended and unintended upon social institutions and individuals. He discussed the theoretical categories in the sociology of religion concerning the differences between church and sect, church as a missionary institution, the growth of churches, differences between liberal and conservative churches, the social psychology of religious conversion, interfaith conflict, role of clergy, and internal church conflict. In the second edition Moberg updated each chapter, included discussion on the social conflict surrounding cults and new religions, the resurgence of evangelical churches, the role of the "electronic" church (i.e. broadcasts by televangelists), the ecumenical movement, theories about church life-cycles, and research methodology.

Other aspects of his work has touched on limitations in theory and method in the qualitative research of religion, particularly with the emergence of new religions, New Age spirituality, and the category "spiritual but not religious."

During the 1960s, Moberg emerged as an evangelical intellectual who urged fellow evangelicals to grapple with the tools of the social sciences. He held genuine concerns about the need for social reform and wrote books addressing American evangelicals about the legitimate contributions that Christians may make in the public square. His book, Inasmuch: Christian Social Responsibility in the Twentieth Century, presented an argument that evangelism and social action were twin legitimate activities and he insisted that it was "a sin not be concerned about the needs of suffering mankind." In his retrospective study of American evangelical political thinking, Robert Booth Fowler described Moberg as a "reform-minded" evangelical who was "especially concerned about the poor and the need for active welfare programs."

In the early 1970s, John Warwick Montgomery edited a series of seven books presenting evangelical perspectives on various current issues. Moberg contributed to this series his book The Great Reversal which carried forward his argument among evangelicals about the dangers of confusing theological conservative beliefs with conservative political beliefs. He rejected the dichotomy that evangelicals had become divided over to emphasize either evangelism or social concern:

Some Christians may see the issue of relationships between evangelism and social concern—or, if you prefer, the personal and social dimensions of the Christian gospel—as an old and settled matter ... Each side suspects the Christian credentials of the other. The internal dispute threatens to complete the ruinous work that it has begun. The unresolved polarities in current Christendom are like dynamite; they have the potential for either constructive or destructive explosions. Moberg insisted that evangelicals were obliged to take action against a range of social evils. Moberg revised his work in 1977 and again in 2006. He also charted the sociological differences between Protestant Fundamentalists and Evangelicals.

His interest in the subject of church conflict led to a series of lectures about the tensions raised between the individual versus society that were subsequently published as Wholistic Christianity. In this text he examined the causes of dissent in churches that may be sorted as both internal and external factors. In his analysis he described internal dissent as a reflection of both theological and institutional factors that act upon individual church members, while external factors are understood as stemming from social change and shifts in social values on controverted topics such as peace-violence, ecology, poverty etc.

As a practicing Christian, Moberg had a long interest in the importance of a faith-commitment in the sociological work produced by religiously oriented sociologists. He has been interested in cultivating a distinctly Christian approach to sociological work. Moberg, together with some like-minded Christian sociologists, has been interested in going beyond the traditional secular values that have been foundational in the discipline of sociology to include greater sensitivity to the researcher's personal world-view about the transcendent. In recent years, Moberg has addressed various critical challenges to Christian belief from the standpoint of an apologist integrating faith with insights from sociology.

== Personal life and death ==
Moberg survived both of his wives, Helen and Marlys, and had five children. He died in Glendale, Wisconsin on September 6, 2023, at the age of 101.

== Bibliography ==
- "The Christian Religion and Personal Adjustment in Old Age," American Sociological Review 18 (February 1953): 87–90.
- "Religious Activities and Personal Adjustment in Old Age," Journal of Social Psychology 43 (May 1956): 261–267.
- "Sociology of Religion in the Netherlands," Review of Religious Research 2 (Summer 1960): 1–7.
- "The Future of Human Relations: Evangelical Christianity and the Social Sciences," Bulletin of the Evangelical Theological Society 4 (1961): 105–111.
- "Social Differentiation in the Netherlands," Social Forces 39 (May 1961): 333–337.
- Robert M. Gray and David O. Moberg, The Church and the Older Person (Grand Rapids: William B. Eerdmans, 1962).
- Inasmuch: Christian Social Responsibility in the Twentieth Century (Grand Rapids: William B. Eerdmans, 1965).
- "Church and State in Social Welfare," Journal of Church and State 7 (Autumn 1965): 466–469.
- "The Encounter of Scientific and Religious Values Pertinent to Man's Spiritual Nature," Sociological Analysis 28 (Spring 1967): 22–33.
- [Book review by Moberg] "The Effectiveness of Lutheran Elementary and Secondary Schools as Agencies of Christian Education: An Empirical Evaluation Study," Journal for the Scientific Study of Religion 6 (1967): 304–307.
- "Aging and its Implications for Theological Education," Journal of Pastoral Care 24 (1970): 127–134.
- "Theological Position and Institutional Characteristics of Protestant Congregations: An Exploratory Study," Journal for the Scientific Study of Religion 9 (1970): 53–58.
- "Reflections on the church and the needs of the aging," Pastoral Psychology 22 (June 1971): 54–57.
- "Aged family members and the Church," in Facing The Future: Church and Family Together, Ed. Gary R. Collins (Waco, Texas: Word Books, 1976), 81–96. ISBN 0876808445
- The Great Reversal: Evangelism and Social Concern Rev. Ed. (Philadelphia: J. B. Lippincott, 1977).
- "Fundamentalists and Evangelicals in Society," in Evangelicals: What They Believe, Who They Are, Where They Are Changing, Ed. David F. Wells and John D. Woodbridge (Grand Rapids: Baker, 1977), 163–189.
- "Presidential Address: Virtues for the Sociology of Religion," Sociological Analysis 39 (Spring 1978): 1–18.
- "Baptists in a pluralistic society," Foundations 21 (July–September 1978): 198–210.
- Ed. Spiritual Well-Being: Sociological Perspectives (Washington DC: University Press of America, 1979).
- "Ethical Dimensions of Aging" in Christian Social Ethics, ed. Perry C. Cotham (Grand Rapids: Baker Book House, 1979), 169–185. ISBN 0-8010-24242
- "Why Should Anyone Go to Church? A Sociological View," in Why Sunday Mass? Ed. Karen Hurley, Rev. Ed. (Cincinnati: St. Anthony's Messenger, 1980), 57–88.
- "The Salience of Religion in Everyday Life: selected evidence from survey research in Sweden and America," Sociological Analysis 43 (1982): 205–217.
- The Church as a Social Institution: The Sociology of American Religion, 2nd Ed (Grand Rapids: Baker Book House, 1984). ISBN 0-8010-6168-7
- Wholistic Christianity: An Appeal for a Dynamic, Balanced Faith (Elgin, Illinois: Brethren Press, 1985). ISBN 087178-931-0
- "Bibliography on aging for pastors and other church leaders," Theological Students Fellowship Bulletin 10 (May–June 1987): 351–364.
- "Spirituality and Aging: Challenges on the frontier of gerontology," Southwestern Journal of Theology 31 (198): 12–21.
- "Spiritual Maturity and Wholeness in the Later Years," Journal of Religious Gerontology 7 (1990): 5-24.
- "Preparing for the graying of the Church: Challenges from our changing society," Review and Expositor 88 (1991): 179–193.
- "Refining the nature and Purpose of Research on Religion: Competing Goals in the Early Years (1944-1973) of the RRA and SSSR," Journal for the Scientific Study of Religion 39 (2000): 401–421.
- "What most needs the attention of religion researchers in the twenty-first century?" in Research in the Social Scientific Study of Religion, Vol. 11, Ed. Joanne M. Greer and David O. Moberg, (Stamford, Connecticut: JAI Press, 2000), 1-21.
- Ed. Aging and Spirituality: Spiritual Dimensions of Aging Theory, Research, Practice and Policy (Binghamton; New York; London; Oxford: Haworth Pastoral Press, 2001). ISBN 0789009382
- "Assessing and Measuring Spirituality: Confronting Dilemmas of Universal and Particular Evaluative Criteria," Journal of Adult Development 9 (2002): 47–60.
- "Research in Spirituality, Religion, and Aging," Journal Gerontological Social Work 45 (2005): 11–40.
- Ralph L. Piedmont and David O. Moberg Ed. Research in the Social Scientific Study of Religion, Vol. 15 (Leiden, Netherlands: Brill, 2005). ISBN 90-04-14146-4
- "Spirituality and Aging: Research and Implications," Journal of Religion, Spirituality and Aging 20 (2008): 95–134.
- "Disabilities, Spirituality, and Well-Being in Late Life: Research Foundations for Study and Practice," Journal of Religion, Spirituality and Aging 20 (2008): 313–340.
- "Spirituality Research: measuring the immeasurable?" Perspectives on Science and Christian Faith 62 (2010): 99–114.Available at
- "Expanding Horizons for Spirituality Research," Review of Religious Research 53 (2012): 513–514.
- "I was a target for Muslim evangelization: A Christian critique of Muhammad foretold in the Bible by name," Journal for the Sociological Integration of Religion and Society 3 (2013): 28–41.
- "Hypocrites or Heroes?: The paradoxical portrayal of the Pharisees in the New Testament," Journal for the Sociological Integration of Religion and Society 6 (2016): 39–41.
- Moberg, David O. (1922-), Wheaton College Archives & Special Collections
- "David O. Moberg" (pp. 241–242) in W. Andrew Achenbaum; Daniel M. Albert (1995). Profiles in gerontology: a biographical dictionary. Greenwood. ISBN 978-0-313-29274-3.
