= Dean Hoge =

American sociologist (1937–2008)

Dean R. Hoge (May 27, 1937 – September 13, 2008) was an American sociologist who spent decades studying American Catholics, especially empirical surveys on the priesthood.

== Biography ==
Hoge spend his childhood at New Knoxville, Ohio. He graduated from the Ohio State University School of Architecture in 1960, and studied in 1961 at the University of Bonn, Germany. He received his bachelor's degree from Harvard Divinity School in 1964, and a master's degree in 1967 and a doctorate in 1970, both in sociology from Harvard University.

He served as an instructor and assistant professor at Princeton Theological Seminary, Department of Christianity and Society in New Jersey before joining the Catholic University's faculty in 1974. He served as director of the university's Life Cycle Institute from 1999 to 2004.

In his 34-year career, he wrote 25 books about religious life in America. His research primarily focused on Catholicism. His first major work was Understanding Church Growth and Decline 1950-1978, co-edited with David Roozen. In 1987 he published The Future of Catholic Leadership: Responses to the Priest Shortage, and in 2001 he co-authored Young Adult Catholics: Religion in the Culture of Choice. He co-authored American Catholics: Gender, Generation, and Commitment (2001), authored The First Five Years of the Priesthood (2002), and co-authored Evolving Visions of the Priesthood (2003) and International Priests in America (2006).

Two major Protestant research studies resulted in co-authored books, Vanishing Boundaries: The Religion of Mainline Protestant Baby Boomers (1994) and Pastors in Transition: Why Clergy Leave Local Church Ministry (2005). A cross-denominational study, including Catholics, looked into factors in church giving and led to the book Money Matters: Personal Giving in American Churches (1996).

In 1979/80, he served as president of the Religious Research Association and from October 2007 until his death he served as president of the Society for the Scientific Study of Religion.
