= Guion Griffis Johnson =

American female historian

- Born: Frances Guion Griffis; 11 April 1900; Greenville, Texas
- Died: 12 June 1989 (aged 89)
- Occupation: Historian
- Spouse: Guy Benton Johnson
- Children: Benton Johnson and Edward Johnson

Guion Griffis Johnson (12 April 1900 – 12 June 1989) was an American historian.

== Life ==
Born Frances Guion Griffis in Wolfe City, Texas, on April 11, 1900. She was raised in Greenville, Texas. She married Guy Benton Johnson, a sociologist. They had two sons, Guy Benton Jr. and Edward. She died at the age of 89 on 12 June 1989.

== Academic career ==
She went to Baylor College for Women and studied journalism. After their wedding, she and her husband moved away from Texas to work at the University of North Carolina at Chapel Hill. There she was offered a position as associate professor and earned her PhD in history.

Not many women were active historians at the time. When Johnson was first mentioned in the American Historical Review she was referred to as "he". She published several studies of the Antebellum South, delving into race relations, religion, freed slaves, women's life and other aspects that had previously been treated lightly. Her award-winning book Ante-Bellum North Carolina: A Social History is still considered an important resource.

She became involved in women's organizations and issues after the end World War II, when opportunities for women became limited. She and her husband collaborated on several research projects.

== Writings ==
- Ante-Bellum North Carolina: A Social History. Chapel Hill: Univ. of North Carolina Pr. 1937.
