= Sociology of Religion (journal) =

- Summer 2025 cover
- Discipline: Sociology of religion
- Language: English
- Edited by: Joseph O. Baker

Publication details
- Former name: SA: Sociological Analysis
- History: 1973-present
- Publisher: Oxford University Press on behalf of the Association for the Sociology of Religion
- Frequency: Quarterly
- Impact factor: 3.476 (2020)

Standard abbreviations
- ISO 4: Sociol. Relig.

Indexing
- CODEN: SRELE2
- ISSN: 1069-4404 (print); 1759-8818 (web)
- LCCN: 93642782
- OCLC no.: 30932266

Links
- Journal homepage; Online archive

Sociology of Religion is a quarterly peer-reviewed academic journal that focuses on the sociology of religion. It was established in 1973 under the name SA: Sociological Analysis and adopted its current title in 1993. It is published by Oxford University Press on behalf of the Association for the Sociology of Religion, of which it is the official journal. The editor-in-chief is Joseph O. Baker (East Tennessee State University). According to the Journal Citation Reports, the journal had an impact factor of 3.476 in 2020.
