= Religious Research Association =

- Abbreviation: RRA
- Formation: June 21, 1951; 75 years ago
- Members: 312 (2016)
- President: Patricia Wittberg
- Executive officer: Kevin Dougherty
- Website: rraweb.org
- Formerly called: Religious Research Fellowship

The Religious Research Association (RRA) is an association of researchers and religious professionals.

It was created in 1951 as the Religious Research Fellowship, although it existed informally as far back as the 1920s as a partnership between the Institute of Social and Religious Research and the Federal Council of Churches. Since 1958, it has held an annual lecture series in the name of H. Paul Douglass. Since the 1970s, it has met annually with the Society for the Scientific Study of Religion.

It publishes the Review of Religious Research four times a year (September, December, March, and June). It contains articles, book reviews and reports on research projects.

== Presidents ==
- 1959–1961: Lauris B. Whitman
- 1962–1964: Walter Kloetzli
- 1965–1966: Paul Mundy
- 1967–1970: George W. Kaslow Jr.
- 1971–1973: Thomas M. Gannon
- 1974–1975: Earl D. C. Brewer
- 1976–1977: Ross P. Scherer
- 1978–1979: Barbara J. W. Hargrove
- 1980: Dean R. Hoge
- 1981: G. Douglass Lewis
- 1982: David O. Moberg
- 1983: Jackson W. Carroll
- 1984: William McKinney
- 1984–1986: Constant H. Jacquet
- 1986–1988: Hart M. Nelsen
- 1988–1990: James D. Davidson Jr.
- 1990–1992: Wade Clark Roof
- 1992–1994: Peggy L. Shriver
- 1994–1996: Benton Johnson
- 1996–1998: Carl S. Dudley
- 1998–2000: Edward C. Lehman Jr.
- 2000–2002: Doyle Paul Johnson
- 2002–2004: Nancy Nason-Clark
- 2004–2006: Daniel V. A. Olson
- 2006–2008: C. Kirk Hadaway
- 2008–2010: Keith Wulff
- 2010–2012: John P. Bartkowski
- 2012–2014: Joy Charlton
- 2014–2016: Jack Marcum
- 2016–2018: Scott Thumma
- 2018–2020: Patricia Wittberg
- 2020–2022: Melinda Denton
- 2023–??: Elaine Howard Ecklund

== See also ==
- American Academy of Religion
- Association for the Sociology of Religion
