= Rhys H. Williams (sociologist) =

Rhys H. Williams (born 1955) Until his retirement in 2023, Williams was Professor of Sociology and Chair of the Department of Sociology at Loyola University Chicago. He was also director of the McNamara Center for the Social Study of Religion. He is now Professor Emeritus of Sociology at Loyola, and Visiting Scholar of Sociology at the University of Massachusetts, Amherst.

== Biography ==
He received his undergraduate degree, in Sociology and Political Science from the University of New Mexico in 1979 and his master's (1985) and doctoral (1988) degrees in Sociology from the University of Massachusetts Amherst.

From 1989 to 2001 he taught at Southern Illinois University, Carbondale, and from 2001 until 2009 at the University of Cincinnati. From 2009 to 2023 he taught at Loyola University Chicago. In 1996-1999 he was co-editor, with Joel Best, of the journal Social Problems. From 2003 to 2008 he was editor of the Journal for the Scientific Study of Religion, was president of the Association for the Sociology of Religion in 2009–10 and president of the Society for the Scientific Study of Religion, 2011–12. His research interests span the fields of sociology, religious studies and political science.

== Bibliography ==
- Demerath, N. J., and Rhys H. Williams. A Bridging of Faiths: Religion and Politics in a New England City. Studies in church and state. Princeton, N.J.: Princeton University Press, 1992.
- Williams, Rhys H. Cultural Wars in American Politics: Critical Reviews of a Popular Myth. Social problems and social issues. New York: Aldine de Gruyter, 1997.
- Demerath, N.J. III, Peter Dobkin Hall, Terry Schmitt, and Rhys H. Williams, eds. Sacred Companies: Organizational Aspects of Religion and Religious Aspects of Organizations. New York: Oxford University Press, 1998.
- Williams, Rhys H., ed. Promise Keepers and the New Masculinity: Private Lives and Public Morality. Landam: Lexington Books, 2001.
- Fuist, Todd Nicholas, Ruth Braunstein, and Rhys H. Williams, Religion and Progressive Activism: New Stories about Faith and Politics. New York: New York University Press, 2017.
- Barron, Jessica M. and Rhys H. Williams. The Urban Church Imagined: Religion, Race, and Authenticity in the City. New York: New York University Press, 2017.
- Williams, Rhys H., Raymond Haberski, Jr. and Philip Goff, eds. Civil Religion Today: Religion and the Nation in 21st Century America. New York: New York University Press, 2021.
- and over 30 scholarly articles.
