= Guy Benton Johnson =

American sociologist and social anthropologist (1901–1991)

- Born: February 28, 1901; Caddo Mills, Texas, U.S.
- Died: March 23, 1991 (aged 90); Chapel Hill, North Carolina, U.S.
- Occupation: Sociologist
- Spouse: Guion Griffis Johnson
- Children: Benton Johnson and Edward Johnson

Guy Benton Johnson (February 28, 1901 – March 23, 1991) was an American sociologist and social anthropologist. He was a student of black culture in the rural South and an advocate of racial equality.

== Biography ==
Johnson was born in Caddo Mills, Texas on February 28, 1901. He married Guion Griffis, a noted historian, and together they had two sons: Guy Benton Jr. and Edward. Johnson died in Chapel Hill, North Carolina on March 23, 1991, at the age of 90.

== Academic career ==
Johnson graduated with a Bachelor of Arts from Baylor University and the University of Chicago, and a Master of Arts from the University of North Carolina at Chapel Hill (PhD, 1927). After teaching a year each at Ohio Wesleyan University and Baylor College for Women (now Mary-Hardin Baylor), Johnson was recruited to North Carolina as a research assistant in Howard W. Odum's new Institute for Research in Social Science in 1924, which he never left for long. He taught at Chapel Hill from 1927 until he retired as Kenan Professor of Sociology and Anthropology in 1969.

His main writings were on Southern black folk culture and U.S. race relations. In Folk Culture, he analyzed the Gullah dialect of English spoken by blacks on that isolated South Carolina island and, in sophisticated technical detail, the musical structure of the spirituals they sang to support a new interpretation of black folk culture.
