= Portraits of American Life Study =

Panel study of religion in the United States

The Portraits of American Life Study (abbreviated PALS, originally known as the Panel Study of American Religion and Ethnicity) is a panel study focusing on religion in the United States, particularly as it relates to racial and ethnic diversity. The study's first wave of data collection took place in 2006, and surveyed 2,610 people. In 2008, the researchers attempted re-contact with the 522 original respondents who attended religious services several times per year despite not being a member of a religious congregation. The original 2006 study was led by sociologists Michael Emerson of Rice University and David Sikkink of the University of Notre Dame. In 2012, the researchers surveyed exactly the same people they originally surveyed six years earlier. The 2012 survey showed that a significantly higher percent of Americans (58%) respected all religions equally than did in the original 2006 survey (one-third). In 2016, University of Oklahoma sociologist Samuel Perry analyzed data from the PALS and found that people who watch pornography at least once a week are more likely to be religious six years later. A 2013 Brandeis University analysis of the PALS found that people who consider religion important in their lives are more likely to make decisions based on their religion.
