= Center for the Study of Women in Society =

Organization supporting feminist research

- Abbreviation: CSWS
- Predecessor: Center for the Sociological Study of Women
- Formation: October 1, 1973; 52 years ago
- Founded at: University of Oregon
- Type: NGO
- Legal status: Non-profit
- Purpose: Research, activism
- Location: 340 Hendricks Hall, University of Oregon
- Director: Sangita Gopal
- Affiliations: National Council for Research on Women

The Center for the Study of Women in Society (CSWS) at the University of Oregon in the United States supports feminist research, teaching, activism and creativity. Established in 1973, it is a non-profit partnership between the Associated Students of the University of Oregon Women's Center and the university. According to the Handbook of Gender, Work, and Organization, CSWS is "a major feminist center for scholarship on gender and women".

== Beginnings ==
A 1970 study, "The Status of Women at the University of Oregon", reported that women represented only 10.5% of full-time, 9-month teaching faculty. According to Joan Acker, one of the faculty writing the study, they requested the university develop an affirmative action plan. The plan was only developed, however, after the passage of Title IX in 1972, when it was required of institutions accepting US$50,000 or more in federal aid.

At that time, a small Women's Research and Study Center was funded by a research grant from the Office of Scholarly Research in the Graduate School. Despite statewide budget cuts to education funding, the university supported a women's congress called Women on the Move during the last half of June 1972. The congress "helped energize feminists of all kinds at the University to push for greater change in the decade to come", and led to a proposal for an interdisciplinary women's studies center at the university. The Graduate School required the interdisciplinary proposal to be approved by all departments in the College of Arts and Sciences, but only the Sociology department responded affirmatively.

Thus in 1973, university president Robert D. Clark supported Acker and other faculty in founding the Center for the Sociological Study of Women; its initial budget was approved for three years, amounting to US$5,244 annually, and was "woefully underfunded" for its first decade. Acker became its first director. Acker remembered an early research project with Miriam (Mimi) Johnson, a "Feminism Scale". In a tribute to Johnson she wrote, "The question that correlated most highly with who was most likely to identify with feminism was 'do you shave your legs?' We had a good laugh over that."

During that same period, the university's Acquisitions Librarian Edward Kemp had been acquiring manuscripts related to women's roles in society as leaders, writers, and artists. He became interested in the papers of a feminist and writer, the late Jane Grant, a co-founder of The New Yorker, and wife of William B. Harris, an editor at Fortune magazine. Kemp wrote a note of inquiry to Harris, and met with him in New York. Harris was interested in establishing an endowment to honor his wife, and by 1975 he met twice with President Clark in New York, and visited in Eugene, meeting over dinner with faculty Joan Acker, Miriam Johnson, Marilyn Farwell, and Richard Hill. In 1976, Harris donated Jane Grant's papers to the university, and Kemp went to New York to pack 28 cartons to ship to Eugene. Harris indicated that he was interested in making a bequest, and after his death, the Harris-Grant 1983 bequest amounted to US$3.5 million, a record at the time for the largest donation to the university from a single donor.

== Expanded mission and programming ==
The mission of the Center was expanded in 1983 "to reflect its broader mission to generate, support, and disseminate research on women" and it was renamed the Center for the Study of Women in Society (CSWS). The bequest made possible annual awards totaling US$100,000 "to support research by faculty and graduate students", as well as "visiting scholars, conferences and course planning".

With the Harris-Grant bequest, the research focus of CSWS shifted from sociological research to multidisciplinary research on women. CSWS sponsored research on women in the sciences, humanities, and law. By the late 1980s, CSWS had cooperative projects with the art museum, the women's studies curriculum, and the campus library's special collections. With the UO development fund, CSWS also established grants for women of color and graduate students studying women.

== History ==
Cheris Kramarae, CSWS director in the late 1980s, cited a wide variety of work that the Center contributed to during that period :

... a film about women migrant workers and the dangers of pesticides; the lives of Macedonian (Gypsy) women; ecofeminism; lesbians as metaphor in women's literature; the economy of prostitution in East Asia; violence in the lives of low-income black women; prenatal care for low-income women; children's health; housing for battered women; women's access to public office and financial credit; and AIDS education in Africa.

In the 1990s, in addition to direct support of interdisciplinary research and the Center's own research initiatives, CSWS sponsored forums to share ideas and research among scholars. One of the Center's 1992 research initiatives, Women in the Northwest, benefitted from a 1997 gift of US$100,000 from Mazie Giustina, enabling "ongoing research that linked theoretical, substantive, and policy concerns about women, work, families, economic restructuring, social policy, politics, and the law." Research interest groups that CSWS established during the 1990s included initiatives in feminist humanities, "wired" humanities, and women's health and aging. By 2009, funding from CSWS for faculty and graduate research in more than 20 departments had totaled more than US$2 million.

In 2013, the Center awarded the first Le Guin Feminist Science Fiction Fellowship, a US$3,000 award supporting travel for "research on, and work with, the papers of feminist science fiction authors".

A member of the National Council for Research on Women, CSWS is one of the oldest women's research centers in the United States.
