= Paul Reiss =

14th President of Saint Michael's College
- In office 1985–1996

Personal details
- Born: August 10, 1930 Lake Placid, New York, U.S.
- Died: February 28, 2024 (aged 93) Lake Placid, New York, U.S.
- Education: College of the Holy Cross (BS); Fordham University (MA); Harvard University (PhD)

Paul Jacob Reiss (August 10, 1930 – February 28, 2024) was an American sociologist and academic who served as the 14th president of Saint Michael's College in Colchester, Vermont. During his tenure, 80 percent of the College's facilities were newly built or renovated, and there was extensive computerization on campus. In 1989, he was an American representative at the Vatican consultation that led to Ex corde Ecclesiae.

== Early life and education ==
Paul Jacob Reiss was born on August 10, 1930, in Lake Placid, New York, the third of six children of Julian Reiss and Daisy ("Peggy") Reiss. He attended St. Bernard's School in nearby Saranac Lake, participated in the Boy Scouts, and held his first job delivering the Adirondack Daily Enterprise. After graduating from La Salle Military Academy, he attended the College of the Holy Cross, where he graduated with a Bachelor of Science (B.S.), magna cum laude, in 1952.

Reiss pursued graduate studies in sociology at Fordham University, earning a Master of Arts (M.A.) in 1954, then earned his Ph.D. in sociology from Harvard University in 1960. His doctoral dissertation, The Extended Kinship System in the American Urban Middle Class, examined kinship in the American urban middle class. While at Harvard, Reiss met Rosemary Agnes Donohue, then a student at Emmanuel College; they married in 1955.

== Career ==
After receiving his doctorate, Reiss joined the sociology faculty of Marquette University in 1957 and moved to Wisconsin. Her taught there until 1963, and then moved to Fordham University (1963–1985). From 1969 until 1985, he worked in Fordham's administration as Dean, Vice President, and Executive Vice President before leaving to become President of Saint Michael's (from which he retired as President Emeritus in 1996) he worked in administration as Dean, Vice President, and Executive Vice President.

Reiss was named Vermont Distinguished citizen of the year in 1996 and was awarded honorary degrees by Middlebury College and Showa University of Japan. Reiss's published works in sociology are primarily concerned with family, kinship, higher education, and moral values in Catholic education. Since the 1960s, Reiss and his wife Rosemary have tenaciously and successfully overseen the mission of a foundation established by his father Julian to operate summer camps for underserved children from New York City that focus on academics, leadership and recreation in Lake Placid, NY.

Reiss finished his book titled Dad in 2000. The memoir contains stories about his family, mostly referring to the accomplishments of his ancestors.

== Personal life and death ==
After his retirement from St Michael's College, Reiss served several years as President of the Lake Placid Sinfonietta and as the founding Chairman of Mercy Care for the Adirondacks. Reiss was married to the former Rosemary A. Donohue for over 60 years, until her death in 2023. They had nine children, 30 grandchildren and now have 18 great-grandchildren.

Paul Reiss died on February 28, 2024, at the age of 93.
