= Catholic University of America School of Professional Studies =

Coordinates: 38.9329387°N 76.9977828°W

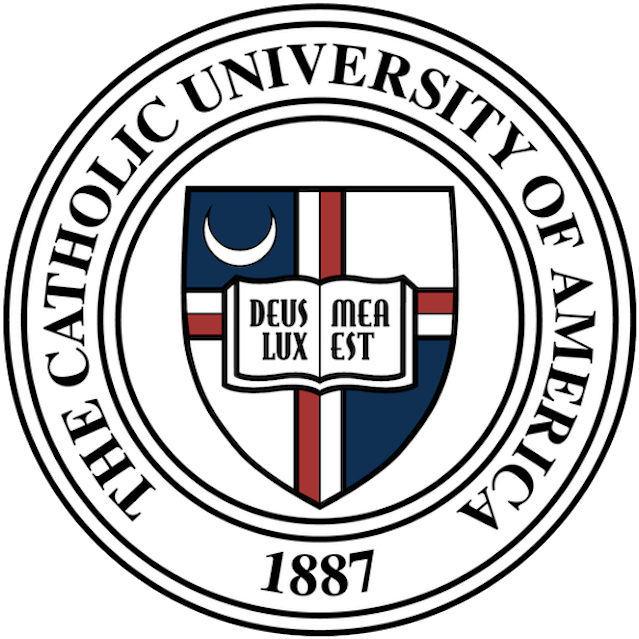
- Established: 1979; 47 years ago
- Parent institution: Catholic University of America
- Affiliation: Catholic
- Dean: David P. Long
- Location: Washington D.C., U.S.
- Website: metro.catholic.edu

The Catholic University of America School of Professional Studies (formerly the Metropolitan School of Professional Studies) is one of the twelve schools at The Catholic University of America, located in Washington, D.C. The school offers accelerated, online, and evening courses for working adults, nontraditional students, and veterans. The school is part of the main campus in the Brookland neighborhood in Northeast D.C.

== History ==
The School of Professional Studies (SPS) was established as University College in 1979 by The Catholic University of America Board of Trustees to extend the university's educational resources and programs to adult students seeking to pursue academic and professional credentials. SPS regards its service to adult students as a special part of The Catholic University of America's overall educational mission. The school also manages summer sessions for high school, undergraduate, and graduate students, as well as The Catholic University of America-Tucson campus.

In September 2024, the school changed its name to the School of Professional Studies. Dean David P. Long explained the reason for the change was that the school is becoming increasingly international in both its undergraduate and graduate populations and operates both in the greater Washington, DC area as well as Tucson, AZ, so therefore it has a broader reach than the metropolitan “DMV” area the previous name had suggested.

The school works closely through partnerships with governmental organizations such as the D.C. Office of the State Superintendent of Education in its DC Futures program and the city of Alexandria, Virginia, as well as religious organizations such as the Brothers of Charity and Catholic Charities.

SPS includes students, faculty, and staff from the greater Washington D.C. area and around the world who represent several ethnic, religious, and socio-economic backgrounds, and offers certificate, associate’s, bachelor’s and master’s level degree programs developed especially for adult and non-traditional students.

The school also hosts an on-site program at the United States Department of Veterans Affairs, and houses the university's Veterans Upward Bound program, which is supported by federal grants from the United States Department of Education.

== Programs of study ==
=== Associate programs ===
- Early Childhood Education
- Human Service Administration
- Information Technology
- Management
- Paralegal Studies

=== Undergraduate programs ===
- Bachelor of Arts in Interdisciplinary Studies
- Bachelor of Arts in Management
- Bachelor of Arts in Information Technology
- Certificate in Human Services Administration
- Certificate in Paralegal Studies

=== Graduate programs ===
- Master of Arts in Interdisciplinary Studies
- Master of Health Administration
- Master of Science in Management
- Certificate in Federal Contract Management
