= Stephen Klineberg =

American sociologist (born 1940)

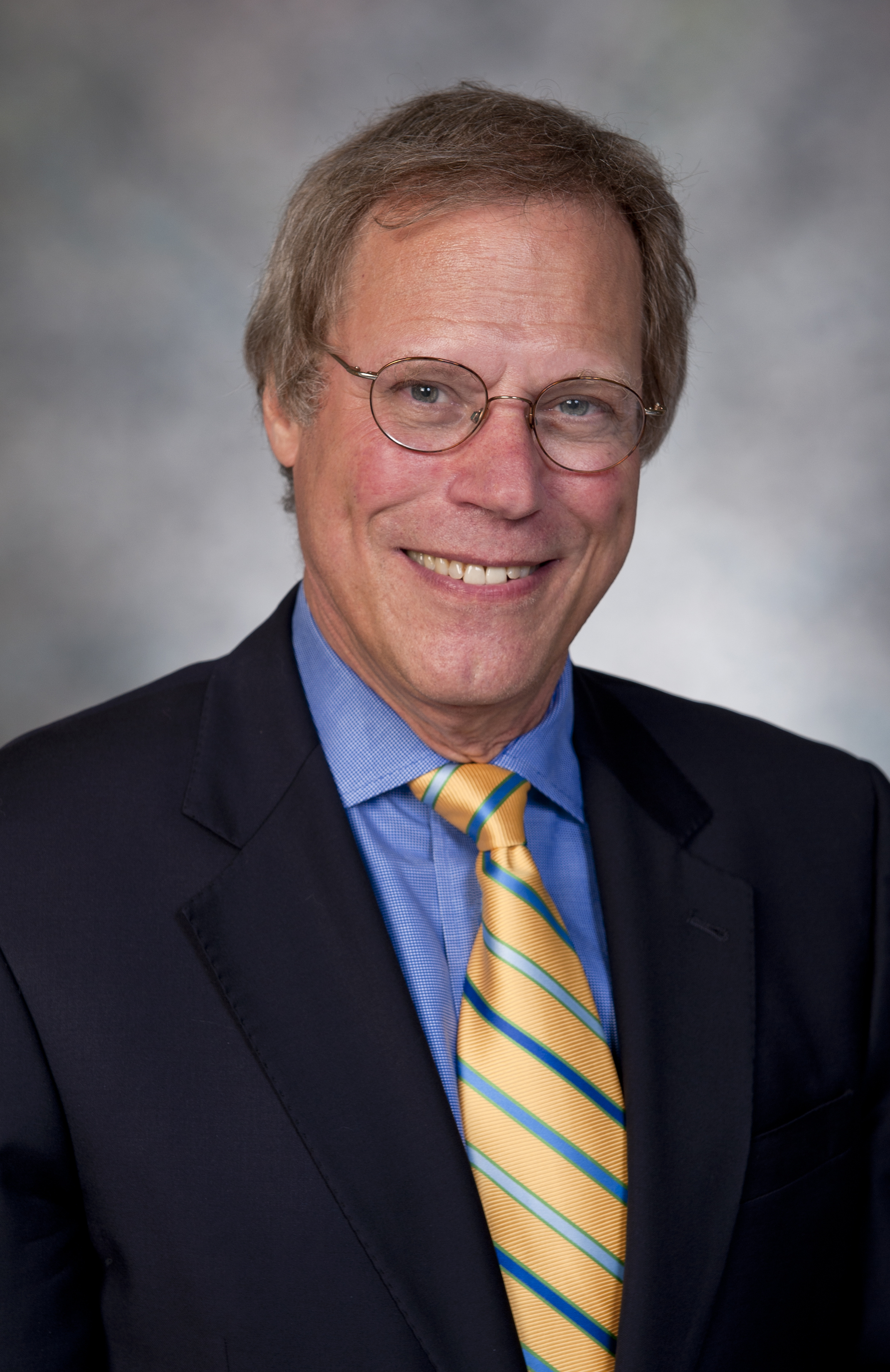
Stephen Klineberg at Rice University.

Stephen Klineberg is a demographics expert and sociologist in Houston, Texas. As a former professor at Rice University, Klineberg and his students began conducting an annual survey in 1982, now called the Kinder Houston Area Survey, that tracks the area's demographics and attitudes. Klineberg is also the founding director of the Kinder Institute for Urban Research, a think tank affiliated with Rice University that focuses on urban issues and challenges facing Houston, the Sun Belt and other major metro areas. Klineberg founded the institute in 2010 with a $15 million gift from philanthropists Richard and Nancy Kinder.

== Education ==
Born in 1940 to a Jewish family in New York City, New York, Klineberg earned his B.A. in psychology from Haverford College in 1961 before going on to graduate school at Harvard University. While enrolled there, Klineberg studied at the University of Paris, where he received his M.A., before returning to Harvard to complete his Ph.D. in social psychology in 1966. He served as an assistant professor of social psychology at Princeton University for several years before joining Rice University as an associate professor of sociology in 1972.

== Work ==
Klineberg's work focuses on social change. Driven by the findings of the annual Kinder Houston Area Survey, Klineberg has become an expert on Houston's diversity, arguing that it foreshadows the country's own demographic trajectory.

As the survey has expanded from Harris County to include neighboring Fort Bend County and Montgomery County, Klineberg has been frequently cited as claiming that Fort Bend County, to the west of Houston, is the most ethnically diverse county in the country. The survey's annual findings provide insight into the area's religion, economic outlook and attitudes toward a range of issues, including the death penalty, immigration and politics.

Klineberg has become an expert on the Houston area, often cited in both local and national publications, including, The New York Times, The Atlantic Monthly and The Wall Street Journal as well as National Public Radio.

Klineberg is co-author of The Present of Things Future: Explorations of Time in Human Experience. In 2020, he published Prophetic City: Houston on the Cusp of a Changing America, based on the findings from the Kinder Houston Area Survey.

== Awards ==
Throughout his career, Klineberg has earned several awards and honors, including the George R. Brown Award for Superior Teaching. In 1996, he earned the George R. Brown Prize for Excellence in Teaching, Rice University's highest teaching award.
