= William V. D'Antonio =

Italian-American sociologist and educator (born 1926)

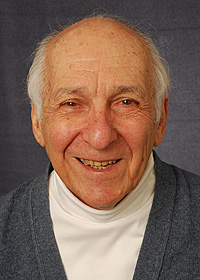
- Born: February 7, 1926 (age 100); New Haven, Connecticut, U.S.
- Spouse: Lorraine Giorgio
- Children: Joanne, Albert, Carla, Nancy, Raissa, Laura

Academic background
- Education: B.A., Yale University, M.A., University of Wisconsin PH.D., Michigan State University
- Website: https://sociology.catholic.edu/faculty-and-research/faculty-profiles/dantonio-william/index.html

William Vincent D'Antonio (born February 7, 1926) is an Italian-American sociologist and educator. His contributions, to these fields include 12 book publications and numerous articles published in professional journals and newspapers. He was the Executive Officer of the American Sociological Association for 9 years and the author of the first mass-selling Introductory Sociology textbook in the 1970s. He is known most recently for his research studying religion and family in the United States, with a focus on American Catholics, and is currently a senior fellow in the Institute for Policy Research and Catholic Studies (IPR) (formerly the Life Cycle Institute) at the Catholic University of America in Washington, D.C.

== Early life and education ==
William Vincent D'Antonio was born on February 7, 1926, in New Haven, Connecticut, the second son of Albert D'Antonio and Marie Nuzzo. Albert worked for the U.S. Post Office and became postmaster of Yale Station. His mother worked in factories since age 12, and became a licensed practical nurse. Bill D'Antonio's childhood years were influenced by his immigrant family experience. His neighborhood was Irish, but by the process of succession became Italian. They were surrounded by Jewish families who immigrated to New Haven in the early 1900s. Growing up in a multi-cultural neighborhood, Bill gained an awareness of cultural identity which led to his interest in Sociology.

D'Antonio attended New Haven's Hillhouse High School and then went to Yale University in 1943. In 1944, he was drafted and enlisted in the U.S. Navy. After serving for two years he returned to Yale and received his B.A. in Latin American Studies in 1948. In January, 1949 he began teaching Spanish at the Loomis Chaffee School in Windsor, Connecticut, where he would continue teaching for over 5 years. On June 15, 1950, he married A. Lorraine Giorgio, also from New Haven.

D'Antonio received his master's degree from the University of Wisconsin in Hispanic Studies in 1953. In 1958 he completed his Ph.D. from Michigan State University in Sociology & Anthropology. In the fall of 1959, after two years on the faculty of MSU, he became an assistant professor at the University of Notre Dame in South Bend, Indiana. There, he served as Professor and Chairman of the Sociology Department from 1966 to 1971.

== Career ==
=== The University of Notre Dame ===
From 1959 to 1971, D'Antonio conducted research on the U.S.-Mexican border, supported by funding from the Carnegie Corporation, the U.S. Public Health Service, and The Social Science Research Council. This resulted in the book Influentials in Two Border Cities (1965). Concurrently, a grant from the Rockefeller Foundation led to a Symposium at Notre Dame and publication of the book, Religion, Revolution and Reform: New Forces for Change in Latin America (1964).

Another area of D'Antonio's research was on the topic of Birth Control and the Catholic Church. Research grants from The Carnegie Corporation, the Department of Health, Education and Welfare (HEW), and The Rockefeller Foundation, allowed him to examine the role of the Catholic Church at a time when birth control, public policy and a woman's right to choose had become prevalent political issues. In the 1960s the Vatican, Pope Paul VI, and most church officials in America did not embrace academic research that was contrary to current church policy. D'Antonio's research provided substantial data that supported changes in public attitudes and policy.

Beginning in the fall of 1963, and extending to 1968, Notre Dame created a Committee on "Population and Responsible Parenthood", which included Social Scientists, Medical Doctors, Philosophers, Theologians, and Lawyers, all working informally with the Papal Birth Control Commission. The objective was to determine whether it was possible to change the Church's current position (that was against contraceptive birth control.) In the summer of 1965 the Commission recommended amending their policy to be more aligned with the opinions and beliefs of American Catholics.

D'Antonio was asked to organize the Catholic Committee on Population and Government Policy. This national group consisted of faculty from 57 Catholic colleges, clergy, nuns, lawyers and physicians, all of whom supported government family planning programs. Father Dexter Hanley, a Georgetown University Law Professor, prepared a legal brief showing that it would be ethically possible for the government to provide funds for family planning, as long as all methods of family planning were offered and that there was no coercion or pressure against moral choice. Some 517 Catholics, including four Law School Deans and several Medical School leaders signed in support. On May 10, 1966, D'Antonio, as chairman, testified before the Senate Committee on Labor and Public Welfare in Washington, stating, "in a pluralistic society, some legislation may be desirable even though it may not be in accord with the moral principles of a minority of the society's members."

On May 11, 1966, The New York Times published an article citing a Gallup poll showing that 59% of the nation's Roman Catholics supported Federal Aid for family planning clinics. In November, Congress passed Federal Public Law 89-749, the Comprehensive Health Planning and Public Health Services Act of 1966. It was part of President Lyndon Johnson's War on Poverty, and was intended to provide funding to states to support a variety of community health programs, including family planning services to poor women.

At the encouragement of Father Theodore Hesburgh, in 1967, D'Antonio was asked to advise the first Family Planning office in South Bend. This included the establishment of the first family planning clinic; the St. Joseph County Family Planning Center.

=== The University of Connecticut ===
In 1971, D'Antonio left Notre Dame and became a professor at the University of Connecticut (UConn) where he also served as chair of their Sociology Department for five years. The reason for leaving Notre Dame was based in part on his concerns over growing racial and ethnic unrest in his home state. In 1974, he received an ethnic heritage grant from the Department of Health, Education and Welfare (HEW) to create booklets on the 12 largest ethnic-racial groups in Connecticut for use in high school programs. The goal was to help students of all ethnicity understand how they were all a vital part of the history of their town, state and country. The UConn School of Education successfully carried out the program for many years in an effort to reduce racial discrimination by promoting cultural understanding and ethnic pride.

Another area of political activism served by D'Antonio involved a new group of faculty leaders organized under the banner of the AAUP, the American Association of University Professors. They accepted then governor Ella Grasso's invitation to organize themselves as unions able to bargain with the State over salaries and other employee benefits. During this time period D'Antonio was also active in collective bargaining efforts with State legislatures on behalf of the faculty to ensure good pension plans and health insurance for life.

His introductory textbook, co-authored with Melvin and Lois DeFleur: Man in Society, was published by Scott Foresman in 1971. It was the first mass-market sociology textbook and sold a record number of books in its first printing. The book's success turned his attention to the manner in which sociology was being taught to students during a time period which brought many changes in the United States (Civil Rights, the Vietnam War, The Women's Movement). He organized a course "Helping Graduate Students Learn To Teach" and became an active member of the American Sociological Association's unique program on teaching sociology.

=== The American Sociological Association ===
D'Antonio served as Executive Officer of the American Sociological Association (ASA) in Washington, D.C. from 1982 to 1991.

Throughout his terms in office at the ASA, D'Antonio worked to lead national discussions on the value of undergraduate teaching and to develop resources for improving the quality of classroom teaching. This was a major paradigm shift for higher education in the US and around the world. As a member of the ASA Teaching Projects, circa 1976–1986, he contributed to the debates on how research and teaching were rewarded in higher education. Up to this point, there were higher rewards for research, so teaching had been taken less seriously. D'Antonio's status as a leading sociologist and director of the ASA provided the credibility needed to change this.

When D'Antonio first arrived at the ASA in Washington, Ronald Reagan was president, and the country was dealing with Reaganomics. The Reagan Administration had been trying to cut the social sciences from Federal programs such as the National Science Foundation, the National Endowment for the Humanities and the National Institute of Mental Health. Many of these cuts included Sociological research. To combat those cuts, D'Antonio supported the Consortium of Social Science Associations (COSSA). This newly forming, Washington based advocacy group represented all Social and Behavioral sciences. In 1986 he became the chair of their governing board, a position he held until his retirement in 1991. By then, D'Antonio's outspoken advocacy work on behalf of social science research helped COSSA grow to include membership from another 50 universities. Their annual meetings attracted members of Congress, national scholars, and members of President George H.W. Bush's cabinet. One such member, Dr. D. Allan Bromley, was a distinguished Yale Physics professor and the President's Science Advisor. Dr. Bromley publicly upheld his belief that "the social sciences will have as large a role to play in the next two decades of world history as will the other sciences and engineering. (P 167, Observing, A Collection of writings in ASA Footnotes by William V. D'Antonio, 1991.) In June, 1991, the National Science Foundation voted to allow the Social and Behavioral Sciences to have their own Directorate, a change from when D'Antonio took over as ASA's Executive Officer in 1982.

In 1989, as the Cold War was coming to an end, the ASA was the first U.S. academic association to reach out to the Soviet Union's new leader Mikhail Gorbachev under his "glasnost" program to promote changes in economic policy, internal affairs and international relations. Under the direction of D'Antonio, the ASA worked with the Soviet Sociological Association to provide full scholarships and housing for outstanding Soviet scholars to receive their PhDs at approximately 20 American Universities.

Other events of note during this time period: The University of Connecticut awarded him with emeritus Professor Status in 1986.

=== Catholic University ===
After retiring from the ASA in 1991, D'Antonio became a visiting professor at George Washington University in Washington, DC. In 1993 he became an Adjunct Research Professor and Fellow at the Life Cycle Institute at the Catholic University of America (CUA). In 2007 he became a Senior Fellow at the Institute for Policy Research and Catholic Studies at Catholic University. During this time period his research and publications focused on religion and voting patterns, mostly with Catholics. He continues to write books and oversee research today. His most recent media appearance was in a PBS documentary The Italian Americans, a 4-part television series on how immigrants from Italy came to shape America.

== Honors and distinctions ==
- 2009. The Rev. Louis J. Luzbetak, SVD, Award for Exemplary Church Research. The Center for Applied Research in the Apostolate (CARA) at Georgetown University
- 2009. Center for the Study of Religion and Society at the University of Notre Dame established The William D'Antonio Award to honor the scholarly labors, achievements, and promise of a graduate student determined most to merit the award in each year. Year-End Award Archive // Center for the Study of Religion and Society // University of Notre Dame
- 2004. Tira a Segno Foundation at New York University for outstanding contributions to the field of Higher Education (teaching, research, publications and leadership)
- 2004. Fulbright Senior Fellowship Award to University of Rome and University of Trieste, Italy
- 2003. Honorary Doctorate of Humane Letters, St. Michael's College, Colchester, Vermont
- 2003. Morris Rosenberg Award for Recent Scholarly Achievement, District of Columbia Sociological Society
- 1998. Convocation Address, "When Rights Collide: Matters of Life and Death", The Sam Rayburn Public Affairs Symposium, Texas A&M University, Commerce, Texas
- 1995. Stuart A. Rice Merit Award, District of Columbia Sociological Society
- 1991. Aida Tomeh Distinguished Service Award, North Central Sociological Association
- 1986. Emeritus Professor, The University of Connecticut

== Books ==
- 2013. D'Antonio, W. V., S. A. Tuch, J. R. Baker. Religion, Politics, and Polarization: How Religio-political Conflict is Changing Congress and American Democracy. Rowman & Littlefield Publisher
- 2013. D'Antonio, W. V., M. Dillon, M. L. Gautier. American Catholics in Transition. Rowman & Littlefield Publishers
- 2012. "Catholic Bishops and the Electoral Process" in Voting and Holiness: Catholic Perspectives on Political Participation, ed. by N. Cafardi, (Paulist Press, TBP)
- 2007. D'Antonio, W. V., and A. Pogorelc, Voices of the Faithful: Loyal Catholics Striving for Change. Crossroad Publishing.
- 2007. D'Antonio, W.V., J. D. Davidson, D. Hoge, and M. Gautier. American Catholics Today: New Realities of Their faith and Their Church. Rowman & Littlefield
- 2001. W. V. D'Antonio, J. D. Davidson, D. R. Hoge, K. Meyer, W. B. Friend. American Catholics: Gender, Generation, and Commitment. Rowman & Littlefield, Altamira
- 2000. Lee, B. J., W. V. D'Antonio, and V. P. Elizondo. The Catholic Experience of Small Christian Communities. Paulist Press.
- 1996. D'Antonio, W. V., M. Sasaki, and Yoshio Yonebayashi, editors. Ecology, Society and the Quality of Social Life. Transaction Publishing Co.
- 1996. D'Antonio, William V., J.D. Davidson, D. Hoge, and R. Wallace. Laity, American and Catholic: Transforming the Church. Rowman & Littlefield
- 1989. D'Antonio, William V., J.D. Davidson, D. Hoge, and R. Wallace. American Catholic Laity in a Changing Church. Rowman & Littlefield
- 1983. D'Antonio, William V., and Joan Aldous. Families and Religions: Conflict and Change in Modern Society. Beverly Hills, California: Sage Publications
- 1980. D'Antonio, William V. Religion and the Family: Exploring a Changing Relationship. University of Notre Dame, Center for the Study of American Catholicism
- 1974. Pierson, E. and W.V. D'Antonio. Female and Male: Dimensions of Human Sexuality. J.B. Lippincott
- 1973. DeFleur, Melvin Lawrence, William V. D'Antonio, and Lois B. DeFleur. Sociology: Human Society. Scott, Foresman
- 1971. DeFleur, Melvin Lawrence, William V. d'Antonio, and Lois B. DeFleur. Sociology: Man in society. Scott, Foresman
- 1965. D'Antonio, W.V. and W. H. Form. Influentials in Two Border Cities: A Study in Community Decision-Making. University of Notre Dame Press
- 1964. Hills, G., D'Antonio, W. V., Pike, F. B., & Bishop, J. Religion, Revolution and Reform: New Forces For Change In Latin America. New York: Praeger
- 1961. Drucker, Peter Ferdinand. Power and Democracy in America. Eds. William V. D'Antonio, and Howard J. Ehrlich. University of Notre Dame Press

== Misc. Articles and notes ==
- April 14, 2008, The New York Times: "In U.S., a Pained and Uncertain Church Awaits the Pope: [National Desk]."
- October 15, 1983, The New York Times: Scholars Find Bad Image Still Plagues U.S. Italians. Walter. New York Times, Late Edition (East Coast); New York, N.Y. [New York, N.Y]15 Oct 1983: 1.25.
- 04 Sep 1989, The New York Times: French, Howard W. "Hatred and Social Isolation may Spur Acts of Racial Violence, Experts Say." New York Times, Late Edition (East Coast) ed., Sep 04 1989
- May 15, 1983, The New York Times: Italian Americans Coming Into Their Own. Stephen S. Hall; Stephen S. Hall, a freelance writer based in New York, is the grandson of Italian. New York Times, Late Edition (East Coast); New York, N.Y.
- June 27, 1989. The New York Times: "Sociology Is a Young Science, Still Carving Its Place" Letter To the Editor: WILLIAM V. D'ANTONIO CARLA B. HOWERY, STEPHEN A. BUFF Washington, June 7, 1989. The writers are, respectively, executive officer and assistant executive officers, American Sociological Assn.
- "Scholars Back Bishop Shannon; Petition to Cardinal Defends Prelate's Church Loyalty". The New York Times. June 22, 1969. p. 56.
