= Bill McKinney (theologian) =

American theologian

William McKinney is the former President and Professor of American Religion of Pacific School of Religion (PSR) in Berkeley, California, the oldest theological seminary in the American West. McKinney is a sociologist of religion by training and also an ordained minister in the United Church of Christ. (UCC) His research interests include Protestant congregational dynamics, and the recent history and prospects for Mainline Protestant denominations. At PSR from July 1986 to June 2010, McKinney was previously Dean of Hartford Seminary.

== Publications ==
=== Books ===
- Roof, Wade Clark, and William McKinney. American Mainline Religion: Its Changing Shape and Future. New Brunswick, [N.J.]: Rutgers University Press, 1987. ISBN 978-0-8135-1216-7 in 888 WorldCat libraries.
- McKinney, William. The Responsibility People: Eighteen Senior Leaders of Protestant Churches and National Ecumenical Agencies Reflect on Church Leadership. Grand Rapids, Mich: W.B. Eerdmans, 1994 in 146 worldcat libraries
- McKinney, William, David A. Roozen, and Jackson W. Carroll. Religion's Public Presence: Community Leaders Assess the Contribution of Churches and Synagogues. An Alban Institute publication. Washington, DC: Alban Institute, 1982. OCLC 10069485 in 60 WorldCat libraries.
- McKinney, William. Public Perceptions of the United Church of Christ: An Exploratory Study. New York: Board for Homeland Ministries, 1982. OCLC 36882784
