= Journal for the Scientific Study of Religion =

Academic journal of religious studies

- Discipline: Multidisciplinary
- Language: English
- Edited by: Korie Little Edwards

Publication details
- History: 1961–present
- Publisher: Wiley-Blackwell on behalf of the Society for the Scientific Study of Religion
- Frequency: Quarterly
- Impact factor: 2.4 (2022)

Standard abbreviations
- ISO 4: J. Sci. Study Relig.

Indexing
- ISSN: 0021-8294 (print); 1468-5906 (web)
- JSTOR: 00218294

Links
- Journal homepage; Online access; Online archive

The Journal for the Scientific Study of Religion (JSSR) is a quarterly peer-reviewed academic journal published by Wiley-Blackwell in the United States under the auspices of the Society for the Scientific Study of Religion, dedicated to publishing scholarly articles in the social sciences, including psychology, sociology, and anthropology, devoted to the study of religion. It is not a theology journal, as its publications tend to be empirical papers in the aforementioned disciplines, rather than papers assessing the truth or falsity, or otherwise attempting to clarify, theological doctrines. However, the eminent theologian Paul Tillich wrote a preface to the first edition, published in 1961. A former editor, Ralph W. Hood, is a major name in the psychology of religion, having published scales to assess religious experience and mystical experience. Hood was succeeded as editor in 1999 by Ted Jelen, the first ever political scientist to edit the journal. Jelen was later succeeded as editor by sociologist Rhys Williams. The current editor of the journal is Korie Little Edwards (Ohio State University).

According to the Journal Citation Reports, the journal has a 2022 impact factor of 2.4, ranking it 59th out of 149 journals in the category "Sociology".
