= Theory of religious economy =

Economic theory

The phrase "religious economy" refers to religious persons and organizations interacting within a market framework of competing groups and ideologies. An economy makes it possible for religious suppliers to meet the demands of different religious consumers. By offering an array of religions and religious products, a competitive religious economy stimulates such activity in a market-type setting.

The theory of religious economy applies rational choice theory to the theory of religion such that supply and demand are used to model the development and success of organized religions. Major proponents of the theory include William Sims Bainbridge, Roger Finke, Laurence Iannaccone, and Rodney Stark.

== Defining a religious economy ==
Various definitions of a "religious economy" exist:

- Sociologically, a religious economy includes "all of the religious activity going on in any society".
- A economic view may emphasise the "environment where religious goods and services are exchanged between consumers [...] and producers [...]".
- A marketing approach to the religious economy may focus on markets or marketplaces for conversions or for physical religious products.

== Major debates ==
The idea of religious economy frames religion as a product, and those who practice or identify with any particular religion as consumers. But when the concept of belief comes into the equation, this definition expands, and ideology affects the "product" and who "consumes" it. When examining depictions of religious identity in a global world, it is easy to see how ideology affects religious economy.

Carl L. Bankston III refers to religions and religious groups as "…competing firms [that vie for] customers who make rational choices among available products…" (311). Using a liberal economic (see Economic liberalism) framework for analysis, Bankston claims that religions and religious groups' popularity depends on the laws of supply and demand. As a religious marketplace, religious consumers are subject to things such as marketing, availability of product, resources, brand recognition, etc. But unlike some physical commodity (such as a computer), religious commodities speak to an individual's beliefs. Bankston poses the idea that belief deals with ideology and extends beyond what one would typically define as a market good by stating "…belief is produced and resides in communicated thoughts, (and) the consumers of goods of faith can only become consumers by becoming producers, by participating in interactions of belief…" (322).

=== Secularization and religious economy ===
Prior to the emergence of the theory of religious economy, some scholars of religion, such as Steve Bruce, believed that modernization would inevitably lead to the erosion of religiosity. These sociologists predicted the disappearance of religion from Earth, based on the decline in religious belief and observance in Western Europe. According to the theory of religious economy, societies that restrict supply of religion, either through an imposed state religious monopoly or through state-sponsored secularization, are the main causes of drops in religiosity. Correspondingly, the more religions a society has, the more likely the population is to be religious. This is refuted in the orthodox view by stating that a liberal religious community, if tolerant of a wide array of belief, is less likely to hold certain beliefs in common, so nothing can be shared and reified in a community context. If nothing is shared, then nothing is shunned, and there is thus a loss in observance of modern liberal traditions.

==== Revival ====
According to Rodney Stark, revival is another aspect of religious change which coincides with secularization. Revival often begins in a context of perceived spiritual or moral decline, where individuals or communities feel alienated from their faith or see institutional religion as stagnant or corrupt. External factors, such as social upheaval, economic challenges, or cultural shift can also contribute to such dissatisfaction.

This sense of alienation can lead to a growing awareness of a need for renewal among followers of a faith. Individuals may experience a sense of guilt or conviction, often fuelled by charismatic leaders or preachers emphasizing the urgency of repentance. Consequently, many followers go through personal transformations, or "conversions", where individuals recommit to their faith, often adopting stricter moral and spiritual practices.

Religious revivals can spread rapidly through social networks, media, or preachers, gaining momentum as more people join a movement. Over time, these revivals either institutionalize — becoming part of a religious tradition — or lose momentum as the initial movement wanes. In some instances, such movements can also lead to the establishment of new denominations, sects, or other organizations.

Some notable examples of revivals include The Great Awakenings, The Pentecostal Revival, and movements such as the 18-century Wahhabi revival.

==== Sects ====
Over time, religious groups will spawn smaller and less worldly subgroups, or "schisms", of the faith, known to sociologists as sects. According to Troeltsch, due to the nature of these sects, they are often short-lived, and do not flourish into a full religion or denomination. Some notable exceptions to short sect-lifespans include Jehovah's Witnesses and the Amish.

Despite their (usually) short life-span, according to Stark and Bainbridge, instead of dying out, some sects can evolve into larger denominations of their parent faith. This process usually requires that a sect realigns its beliefs to be more world-accommodating, grows in size, and forms a more rigid internal hierarchy, as opposed to having a single charismatic leader. This process can come about as a result of multiple factors, such as:

- a generational shift, where younger generations within the sect may seek more comfort and integration within society
- a social-mobility shift, where some members of the sect may achieve upward mobility and become more prosperous, consequently adopting more mainstream norms and values
- newer members joining the sect such that growing its size may break down the close-knit communities within the sect, leading to further institutionalization

As such sects evolve into full-fledged denominations, they start to offer competitive alternatives to their parent faiths. This may produce a shift, where religious groups within a population will follow these new subgroups instead of the parent faith, working against the demise of religion. This trend of revival provides a plausible explanation as to why religious groups may persist despite predictions of their decline, and why once-prominent religious organisations have dissipated.

==== Cults ====
Unlike a sect, which seeks to reform or revive traditions from its parent religion, a cult often introduces novel religious ideas or practices. Sociologists sometimes use the word "cult" as a neutral term for a new religious movement (NRM), and historically, all major religions can be considered cults at their inception. However, the modern stigma attached to the term "cult" has fuelled hostility between these movements and their surrounding societies. Rodney Stark identifies cult formation as a primary response to secularization.

Cult formation can occur as a result of multiple factors. As old faiths weaken, cults may emerge to fill the "spiritual void" left behind. Cults may also emerge as a response to rapid societal transformation, such as industrialization, globalization, or technological advances. Such changes can create uncertainty and alienation, and cults can provide a sense of meaning, belonging, and stability in such times.

Sociologists may identify cults as not having formed as a schism of a larger religion, and as often introducing new ideas and beliefs not previously seen. Cults may cater to specific groups, such as the marginalized, or seekers of mystical experiences. This allows cults to appeal to these groups in a way that traditional religion may not be able to.

Stark argues that this allows religion to undergo a transformation of expression, allowing it to adapt quickly to a changing social environment, and to remain relevant in societies where previous religious institutions no longer fit.

==== Strict regulations to enforce strong ties ====
"Strict" churches are prevalent in the US and around the world, and they are characterized by strong ties within the group with few weak ties branching outside to other groups. Strict churches arise from strict doctrines and can take many forms — such as large churches, sects, or cults, but are not limited to these. Churches are most often known for their "cosmopolitan networks, while sects tend to consist of intense local networks"; while this may be true for “unstrict” doctrines this is not always the case for strict doctrines. Strong doctrines can arise from certain sects as various religions have done (such as Orthodox Judaism, Islam, or certain denominations of Christianity), or can include rather smaller cults or small sects. What all strong doctrines employ though, are formal controls to discourage free-riding within the group and to keep the church strong and together. These controls can vary from church to church but all serve the same purpose of keeping group solidarity.

As commonly seen, strict churches employ various means of keeping ties within their church strong while limiting excessive access to other groups. Such means may include a dress code, eating habits, and rituals that prevent mixing with other groups. The implication of these "strict demands 'strengthen' a church in three ways; they raise overall levels of commitment, they increase average rates of participation, and they enhance the net benefits of membership". Complying with these demands prevent the members of a church from free-loading within the group and promote group solidarity. The strict rules that govern and regulate a church actually help and promote the strength of the ties within the group. Those who don't comply with these strictures are screened out leaving only those who do comply and comply earnestly.” These strict doctrines and regulations serve to keep the church strong and together while screening out members that may actually harm the church unintentionally by functioning as free-loaders within the group.

=== Church-sect theory ===
Originally proposed by H. Richard Niebuhr in his book The Social Sources of Denominationalism, the theory discusses the difference between churches and sects. Niebuhr proposed that sects and churches follow a cycle. Religions originate as sects designed to serve the needs of the deprived. If they flourish, they increasingly serve the interests of the middle- and upper-classes and transform into churches. Once the sects have become churches they become less effective in satisfying the needs of the lower class and sect formation re-occurs.

In 1963 Benton Johnson revised the church-sect theory into its current state. Church and sect form opposite poles on an axis representing the amount of "tension" between religious organizations and their social environments. Tension, as defined by Benton Johnson, is "a manifestation of deviance". The tension is described as existing between the group's members and the outside world. Churches are described as religious bodies having low tension, whereas, sects have high tension.

==== Ideology ====
Some social scientists have become increasingly uncomfortable with what they see as the intermingling of social scientific analysis and free-market ideology in rational choice theory. Some have likewise raised critical questions about the ideological use of neo-classical economic metaphors in rational choice theorizing about religion.

== Development ==
The theory of religious economy arises from the application of fundamental principles of economics to the analysis of religious organizations. Just as commercial economies consist of a market in which different firms compete, religious economies consist of a market (the aggregate demand for religion) and firms (different religious organizations) seeking to attract and hold clients. The theory of religious economy was developed to explain why and how religions change.

== Market situation ==
According to the theory, religious pluralism gives the population a wide variety of choices in religion and leads to a religious economy in which different religious organizations compete for followers, much the way businesses compete for consumers in a commercial economy. The Theory of Religious Economy takes into account a wide spectrum of issues (e.g., the differences between competitive religious markets and religious monopolies), making this theory one of the most significant developments in the social scientific study of religion during the past thirty years. The theory focuses attention on religious suppliers and whether religious firms have the ability to increase the demand for religion.

In a free market, or pluralistic religious market, many religious organizations exist and seek to appeal to certain segments of the market. Organizations in a free market cannot rely on the state for resources so they must compete for participation of the religious consumer. Contest among religious firms results in the specialization of products so that consumers are able to distinguish different organization from others(Chesnut). Pluralistic religions operate on a personal scale, marketing more to individual demands as opposed to public. As the majority of the consumer market, organizations market more to women than men. Pluralism is only possible through lack of favoritism by the state.(Chesnut) A competitive and pluralistic religious economy has a positive effect on levels of participation.

A microeconomic theory of the household production function and time allocation is associated with the work of Chicago economist Gary Becker. An influential approach dating from the 1970s adapts that theory to explain religious participation and a resulting formation of norms. It postulates stable preferences and rational choice constrained by limited human and social capital to explain behavior.

As in economics, the market situation can be described with concepts about monopoly, prohibition, and pluralism. Monopolies in religion are only made possible through state enforcement and often function on a public scale. When the government establishes a set religion and all other competition is drowned out then "believers are culturally connected but not necessarily spiritually" (Andrew Chesnut) to the religion enforced by the state. Since participation in a religious monopoly is not as important because the church does not have to rely on members for resources they are not forced to provide adequate or marketable "religious products" (Chesnut), due to lack of competition. The ability of a religious organization to monopolize a religious economy is entirely dependent on the extent to which the state governs the religious economy. A monopolized religious economy tends to have lower levels of participation.

Some states may categorically ban religious observances, and attempt to sanction those who persist in displaying religious conviction. Disestablishmentarianism results from state withdrawal from an organization that was originally established under the state.

Religious markets are similar to other markets in that they are social creations. The exchanges that take place in a religious market are regulated by social factors. Elements of social interactions such as norms and morals influence the individual choices and preferences of the religious consumer. Therefore, elements of social interactions influence the types of religious goods offered to consumers in the marketplace and the changes in consumer demands over a span of time. Some economists view a person's participation in religious activities, such as attending worship services or venerating a deity, as a form of consumption within a market. For example, Mongol rulers granted tax exemptions to clergy, churches, and religious institutions in exchange for their blessings and prayers for the rulers’ longevity and well-being. In this case, the foregone tax revenue can be seen as the price the Mongols paid for the religious services provided by the clergy and monks. Because the Mongol emperor determined the price, the religious market in the Mongol Empire was not a perfectly competitive market.

According to W. Robertson Smith, "The fear of the gods was a motive to enforce the laws of society which were also the laws of morality". People are taught that those who believe will gain rewards or avoid punishment in the afterlife, and non-believers will miss out on the rewards or receive punishment.

The religious economy model sparked a lively debate among sociologists of religion on whether market models fit religious practices and on the extents to which this model of religious behavior is specific to the United States.
