= Spread of Christianity =

Christianity began as a Second Temple Judaic movement in the 1st century in the Roman province of Judea, from where it spread throughout and beyond the Roman Empire by means of evangelism, Roman policies, the fall of the Roman Empire, and Christianization of the Germanic peoples.

== Origins ==
Christianity "emerged as a movement of Judaism in Roman Judea" in the syncretistic Greco-Roman world of the 1st century AD, which was dominated by Roman law and Hellenistic culture. It started with the ministry of Jesus, who proclaimed the coming of the Kingdom of God. After his death by crucifixion, some of his followers are said to have seen Jesus, and proclaimed him to be alive and resurrected by God. The resurrection of Jesus "signalled for earliest believers that the days of eschatological fulfillment were at hand," (Note: Larry Hurtado (December 4, 2018), "When Christians were Jews": Paula Fredriksen on "The First Generation") and gave the impetus in certain Christian sects to the exaltation of Jesus to the status of divine Son and Lord of God's Kingdom and the resumption of their missionary activity.

== Apostolic Age ==
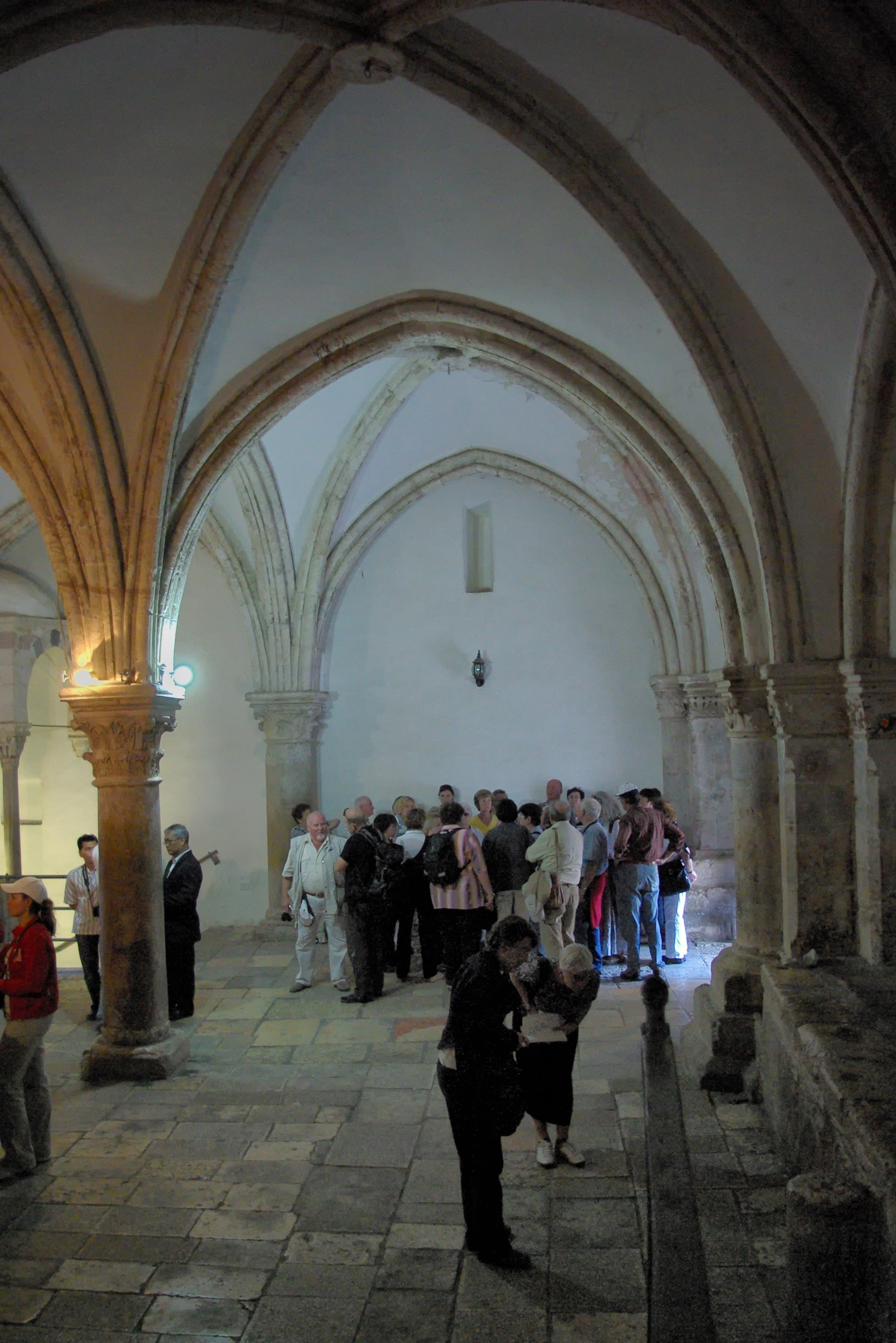
The Cenacle on Mount Zion, claimed to be the location of the Last Supper and Pentecost. Bargil Pixner claims the original Church of the Apostles is located under the current structure.

Traditionally, the years following Jesus until the death of the last of the Twelve Apostles is called the Apostolic Age, after the missionary activities of the apostles. According to the Acts of the Apostles (the historical reliability of which is disputed), the Jerusalem church began at Pentecost with some 120 believers, in an "upper room," believed by some to be the Cenacle, where the apostles received the Holy Spirit and emerged from hiding following the death and resurrection of Jesus to preach and spread his message.

The Christian Testament writings depict what orthodox Christian churches call the Great Commission, an event where they describe the resurrected Jesus Christ instructing his disciples to spread his eschatological message of the coming of the Kingdom of God to all the nations of the world. The most famous version of the Great Commission is in Matthew 28:16–20, where on a mountain in Galilee Jesus calls on his followers to make disciples of and baptize all nations in the name of the Father, the Son, and the Holy Spirit.

Paul's conversion on the road to Damascus is first recorded in Acts 9:13–16. Peter baptized the Roman centurion Cornelius, traditionally considered the first Gentile convert to Christianity, in Acts 10. Based on this, the Antioch church was founded. It is also believed that it was there that the term Christian was coined.

=== Missionary activity ===
After the crucifixion of Jesus, Christianity first emerged as a sect of Judaism as practiced in the Roman province of Judea. The first Christians were all Jews, who constituted a Second Temple Jewish sect with an apocalyptic eschatology.

The Jerusalem community consisted of "Hebrews," Jews speaking both Aramaic and Greek, and "Hellenists," Jews speaking only Greek, possibly diaspora Jews who had resettled in Jerusalem. With the start of their missionary activity, early Jewish Christians also started to attract proselytes, Gentiles who were fully or partly converted to Judaism. (Note: Catholic Encyclopedia: Proselyte: "The English term "proselyte" occurs only in the Christian Testament where it signifies a convert to the Jewish religion (Matthew 23:15; Acts 2:11; 6:5; etc.), though the same Greek word is commonly used in the Septuagint to designate a foreigner living in Judea. The term seems to have passed from an original local and chiefly political sense, in which it was used as early as 300 BC, to a technical and religious meaning in the Judaism of the Christian Testament epoch.") According to James Dunn, Paul's initial persecution of Christians probably was directed against these Greek-speaking "Hellenists" due to their anti-Temple attitude. Within the early Jewish Christian community, this also set them apart from the "Hebrews" and their Tabernacle observance.

Christian missionary activity spread "the Christian Way" and slowly created early centers of Christianity with Gentile adherents in the predominantly Greek-speaking eastern half of the Roman Empire, and then throughout the Hellenistic world and beyond the Roman Empire in Assyria, Mesopotamia, Armenia, Georgia and Persia. (Note: Ecclesiastical historian Henry Hart Milman writes that in much of the first three centuries, even in the Latin-dominated western empire: "the Church of Rome, and most, if not all the Churches of the West, were, if we may so speak, Greek religious colonies [see Greek colonies for the background]. Their language was Greek, their organization Greek, their writers Greek, their scriptures Greek; and many vestiges and traditions show that their ritual, their Liturgy, was Greek.") Early Christian beliefs were proclaimed in kerygma (preaching), some of which are preserved in Christian Testament scripture. The early Gospel message spread orally, probably originally in Aramaic, but almost immediately also in Greek.

The scope of the Jewish-Christian mission expanded over time. While Jesus limited his message to a Jewish audience in Galilea and Judea, after his death his followers extended their outreach to all of Israel, and eventually the whole Jewish diaspora, believing that the Second Coming would only happen when all Jews had received the Gospel. Apostles and preachers traveled to Jewish communities around the Mediterranean Sea, and initially attracted Jewish converts. Within 10 years of the death of Jesus, apostles had attracted enthusiasts for "the Christian Way" from Jerusalem to Antioch, Edessa, Ephesus, Corinth, Thessalonica, Cyprus, Crete, Alexandria and Rome. Over 40 churches were established by 100, most in Asia Minor and Upper Mesopotamia, such as the seven churches of Asia, and some in Greece and Italy.

According to Fredriksen, when early Christians broadened their missionary efforts, they also came into contact with Gentiles attracted to the Jewish religion. Eventually, the Gentiles came to be included in the missionary effort of Hellenised Jews, bringing "all nations" into the house of Christianity's God. The "Hellenists," Greek-speaking diaspora Jews belonging to the early Jerusalem Jesus-movement, played an important role in reaching a Gentile, Greek audience, notably at Antioch, which had a large Jewish community and significant numbers of Gentile "God-fearers." From Antioch, the mission to the Gentiles started, including Paul's, which would fundamentally change the character of the early Christian movement, eventually turning it into a new, Gentile religion. According to Dunn, within ten years after Jesus' death, "the new messianic movement focused on Jesus began to modulate into something different ... it was at Antioch that we can begin to speak of the new movement as 'Christianity'."

=== Paul and the inclusion of Gentiles ===
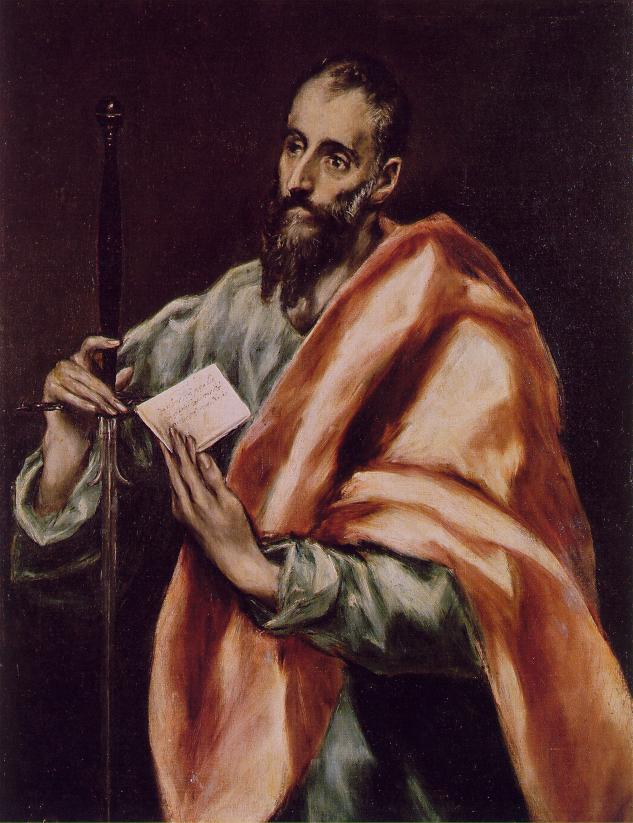
Saint Paul, by El Greco

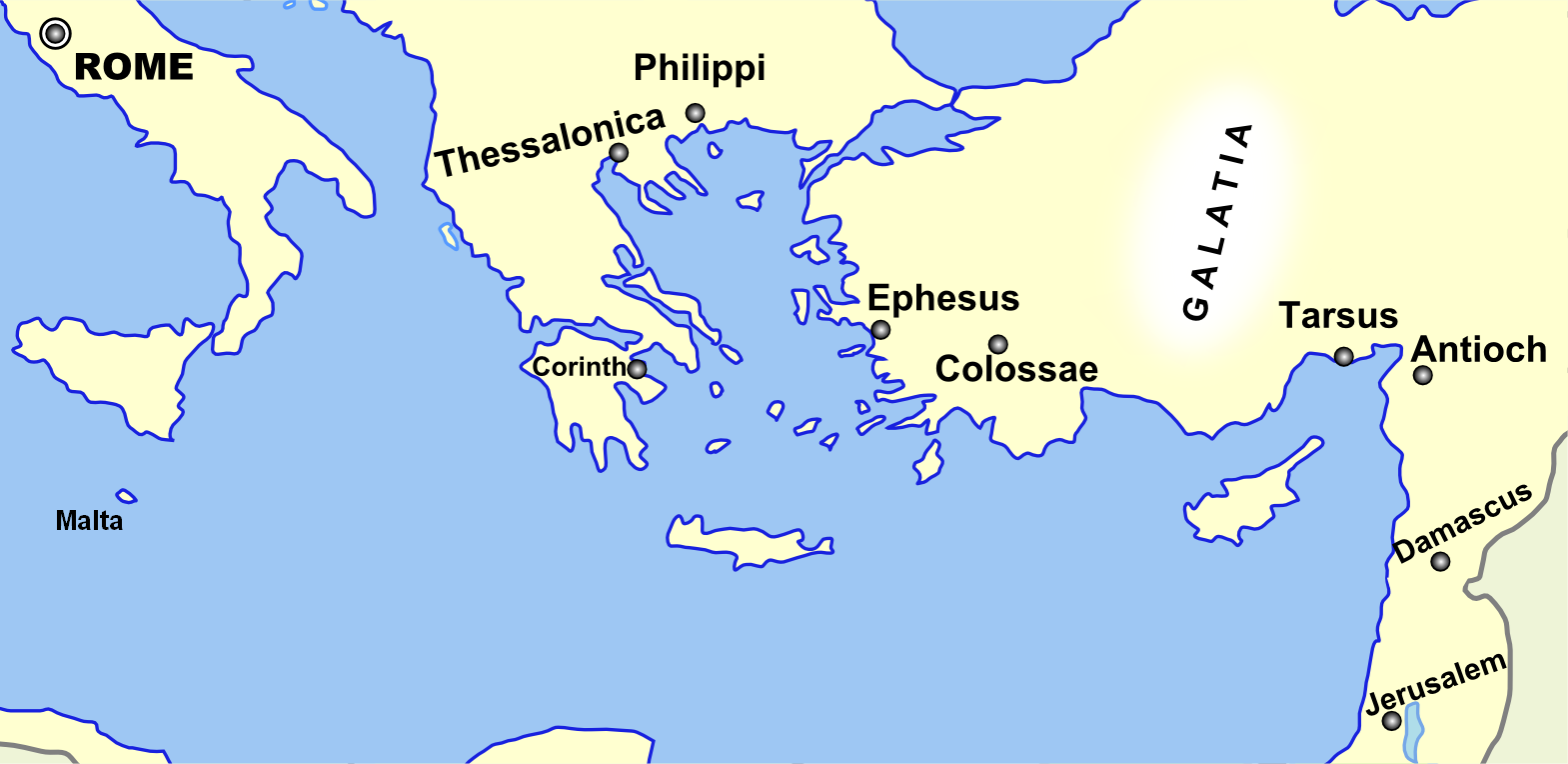
Mediterranean Basin geography relevant to Paul's life, stretching from Jerusalem in the lower right to Rome in the upper left

Paul was responsible for bringing Christianity to Ephesus, Corinth, Philippi, and Thessalonica. According to Larry Hurtado, "Paul saw Jesus' resurrection as ushering in the eschatological time foretold by biblical prophets in which the pagan 'Gentile' nations would turn from their idols and embrace the one true God of Israel (e.g., Zechariah 8:20–23), and Paul saw himself as specially called by God to declare God's eschatological acceptance of the Gentiles and summon them to turn to God." (Note: [Larry Hurtado (August 17, 2017 ), "Paul, the Pagans' Apostle") According to Krister Stendahl, the main concern of Paul's writings on Jesus' role and salvation by faith is not the individual conscience of human sinners and their doubts about being chosen by God or not, but the main concern is the problem of the inclusion of Gentile (Greek) Torah-observers into God's covenant. (Note: Stephen Westerholm (2015), The New Perspective on Paul in Review, Direction, Spring 2015 · Vol. 44 No. 1 · pp. 4–15) "Hebrew" Jewish Christians opposed Paul's interpretations, as exemplified by the Ebionites. The relaxing of requirements in Pauline Christianity opened the way for a much larger Christian Church, extending far beyond the Jewish community. The inclusion of Gentiles is reflected in Luke-Acts, which is an attempt to answer a theological problem, namely how the Messiah of the Jews came to have an overwhelmingly non-Jewish church; the answer it provides, and its central theme, is that the message of Christ was sent to the Gentiles because a number of Jews rejected it.

=== Split with Judaism ===
There was a slowly growing chasm between Gentile Christians, and Jews and Jewish Christians, rather than a sudden split. Even though it is commonly thought that Paul established a Gentile church, it took centuries for a complete break to manifest. Growing tensions led to a starker separation that was virtually complete by the time Jewish Christians refused to join in the Bar Kokhba Jewish revolt of 132. Certain events are perceived as pivotal in the growing rift between Christianity and Judaism.

== Ante-Nicene period (2nd-3rd century) ==
=== Roman Empire ===
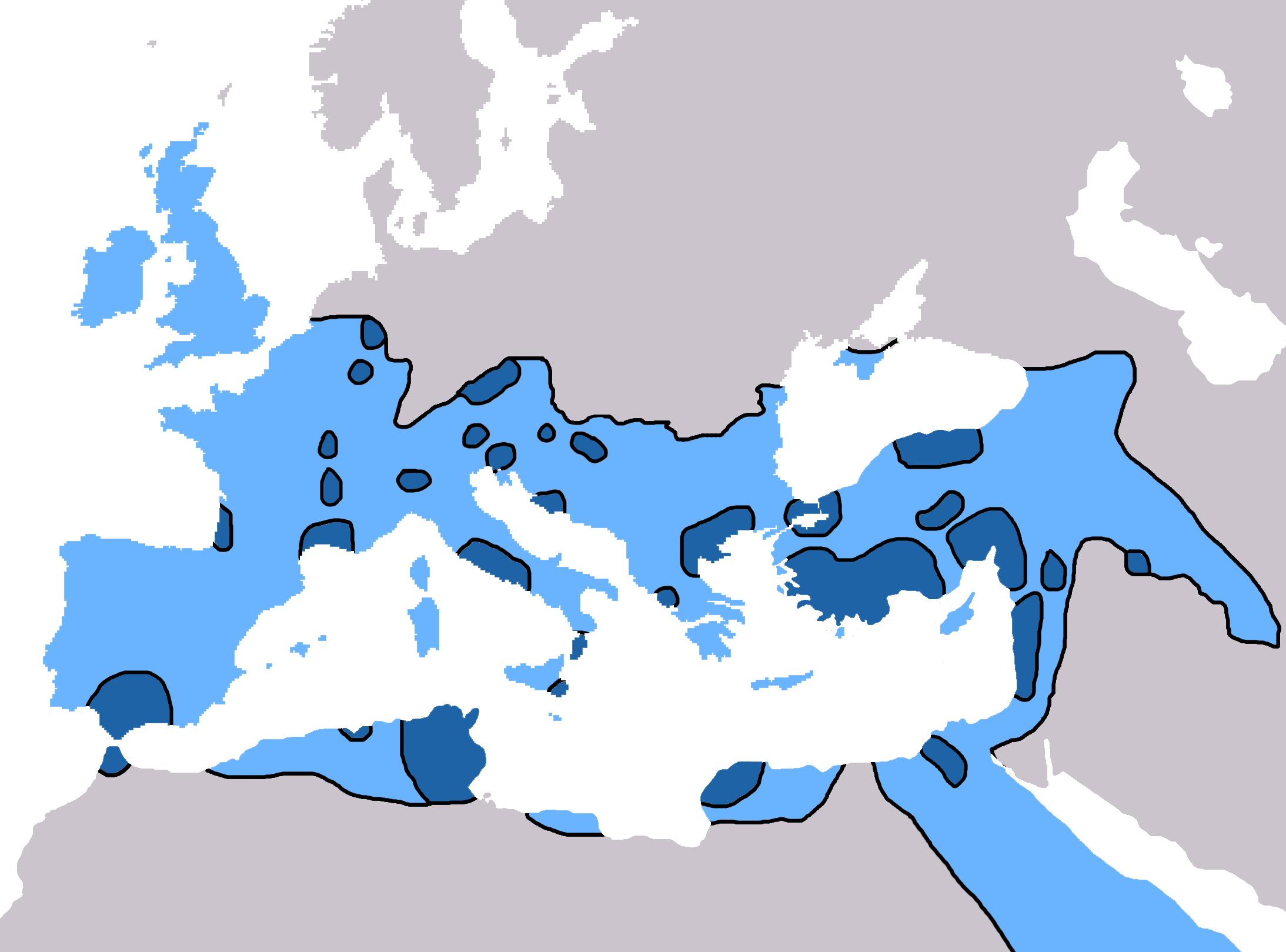
Spread of Christianity to AD 325 Spread of Christianity to AD 600

==== Spread ====
Christianity spread to Late Aramaic-speaking peoples in the greater Levant and also to the inland parts of the Roman Empire, and beyond that into the Parthian (ended in 224) and subsequent Sasanian Empire (224-651), including Upper and Lower Mesopotamia. In 301, the Kingdom of Armenia became the first Persian-allied state to declare Christianity as its state religion, following the conversion of the ruling Arsacid dynasty of Armenia, although the Arab-ruled but Syriac-speaking statelet of Osroene, converted earlier. With Christianity the dominant faith in some urban centers, Christians accounted for approximately 10% of the Roman population by 300, according to some estimates. Christianity then rapidly grew in the 4th century, accounting for 56.5% of the Roman population by 350.

By the latter half of the second century, Christianity had spread east throughout Media, Pars, Parthia, and Bactria. The twenty bishops and a number of presbyters were more of the order of itinerant missionaries, passing from place to place as Paul did and supplying their needs with such occupations as merchant or craftsman.

Various theories attempt to explain how Christianity managed to spread so successfully prior to the Edict of Milan (313). In The Rise of Christianity, Rodney Stark argues that Christianity replaced paganism chiefly because it improved the lives of its adherents in various ways. Dag Øistein Endsjø argues that Christianity was helped by its promise of a general resurrection of the dead at the end of the world; the Christian belief in eternal life was compatible with the ancient Greek belief that true immortality depended on the survival of the body. According to Will Durant, the Christian Church prevailed over paganism because it offered a much more attractive doctrine, and because the church leaders addressed human needs better than their rivals.

Bart D. Ehrman attributes the rapid spread of Christianity to five factors: (1) the promise of salvation and eternal life for everyone was an attractive alternative to Roman religions; (2) stories of miracles and healings purportedly showed that the one Christian God was more powerful than the many Roman gods; (3) Christianity began as a grassroots movement providing hope of a better future in the next life for the lower classes; (4) Christianity took worshipers away from other religions since converts were expected to give up the worship of other gods, unusual in antiquity where worship of many gods was common; (5) in the Roman world, converting one person often meant converting the whole household—if the head of the household was converted, he decided the religion of his wife, children and slaves.

==== Persecutions and legalisation ====
There was no empire-wide persecution of Christians until the reign of Decius in the third century. (Note: Martin, D. 2010. "The 'Afterlife' of the New Testament and Postmodern Interpretation" (lecture transcript). Yale University.) As the Roman Empire experienced the Crisis of the Third Century, the emperor Decius enacted measures intended to restore stability and unity, including a requirement that Roman citizens affirm their loyalty through religious ceremonies pertaining to Imperial cult. In 212, universal citizenship had been granted to all freeborn inhabitants of the empire, and with the edict of Decius enforcing religious conformity in 250, Christian citizens faced an intractable conflict: any citizen who refused to participate in the empire-wide supplicatio was subject to the death penalty. Although lasting only a year, the Decian persecution was a severe departure from previous imperial policy that Christians were not to be sought out and prosecuted as inherently disloyal. Even under Decius, orthodox Christians were subject to arrest only for their refusal to participate in Roman civic religion, and were not prohibited from assembling for worship. Gnostics seem not to have been persecuted.

Christianity flourished during the four decades known as the "Little Peace of the Church", beginning with the reign of Gallienus (253–268), who issued the first official edict of tolerance regarding Christianity. The era of coexistence ended when Diocletian launched the final and "Great" Persecution in 303.

The Edict of Serdica was issued in 311 by the Roman emperor Galerius, officially ending the Diocletianic persecution of Christianity in the East. With the passage in AD 313 of the Edict of Milan, in which the Roman Emperors Constantine the Great and Licinius legalised the Christian religion, persecution of Christians by the Roman state ceased.

=== India ===
According to Indian Christian traditional legends, following previous migration by Jews, Christianity arrived along the southern Indian Malabar Coast via Thomas the Apostle in 52 AD and from this came Thomasine Christianity. But there is no contemporary evidence for this. According to the third century Acts of Thomas, Thomas visited only the realm of Gondophares in Northwest India (which is now Pakistan). Although little is known of the immediate growth of the church, Bar-Daisan (AD 154–223) reports that in his time there were Christian tribes in Northwest India, which claimed to have been converted by Thomas and to have books and relics to prove it. Certainly by the time of the establishment of the Sassanid Empire (AD 226), there were bishops of the Assyrian Church of the East in northwest India, Afghanistan and Baluchistan, with laymen and clergy alike engaging in missionary activity.

== Late Antiquity (313-476) ==
=== Legalisation and Roman state religion ===
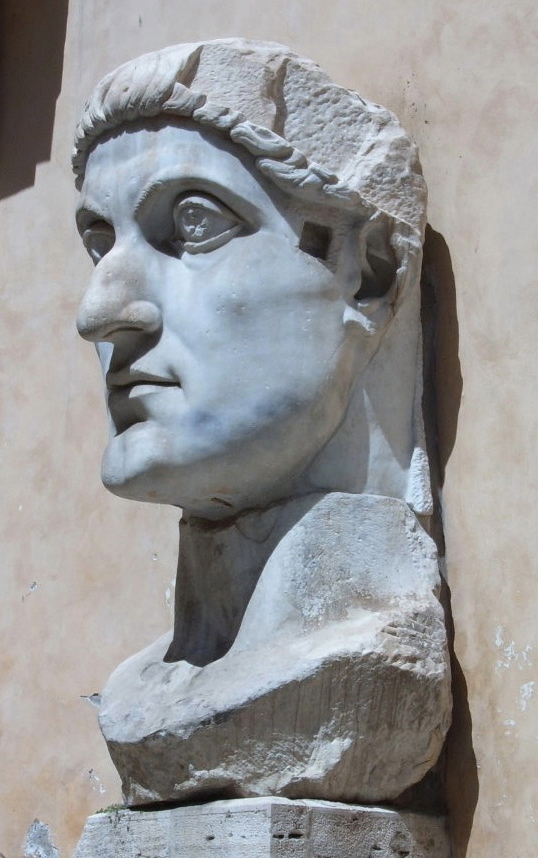
Head of Constantine's colossal statue at Musei Capitolini

In 313, Constantine and Licinius issued the Edict of Milan, officially legalizing Christian worship. In 316, Constantine acted as a judge in a North African dispute concerning the Donatist controversy. More significantly, in 325 he summoned the Council of Nicaea, effectively the first Ecumenical Council (unless the Council of Jerusalem is so classified), to deal mostly with the Arian controversy, but which also issued the Nicene Creed, which among other things professed a belief in One Holy Catholic Apostolic Church, the start of Christendom.

On February 27, 380, the Roman Empire officially adopted Trinitarian Nicene Christianity as its state religion. Prior to this date, Constantius II (337-361) and Valens (364-378) had personally favored Arian or Semi-Arianism forms of Christianity, but Valens' successor Theodosius I supported the Trinitarian doctrine as expounded in the Nicene Creed.

In the several centuries of state-sponsored Christianity that followed, pagans and heretical Christians were routinely persecuted by the Empire and the many kingdoms and countries that later occupied the place of the Empire, but some Germanic tribes remained Arian well into the Middle Ages.

=== Church of the East ===
Historically, the most widespread Christian church in Asia was the Church of the East (now the Assyrian Church of the East), the Christian church of Sasanian. This church is often known as the Nestorian Church, due to its later adoption of the doctrine of Nestorianism, which emphasized the disunity of the divine and human natures of Christ. It has also been known as the Persia Church, the East Syrian Church, the Assyrian Church, and, in China, as the "Luminous Religion".

The Church of the East developed almost wholly apart from the Greek and Roman churches. In the 5th century, it endorsed the doctrine of Nestorius, Patriarch of Constantinople from 428 to 431, especially following the Nestorian Schism after the condemnation of Nestorius for heresy at the First Council of Ephesus. For at least 1,200 years, the Church of the East was noted for its missionary zeal, its high degree of lay participation, its superior educational standards and cultural contributions in less developed countries, and its fortitude in the face of persecution.

==== Persian Empires ====
The Church of the East had its inception at a very early date in the buffer zone between the Parthian and Roman Empires in Assyria, and Edessa (now Şanlıurfa) in northwestern Mesopotamia was from apostolic times the principal center of Syriac-speaking Christianity. When early Christians were scattered abroad because of persecution, some found refuge at Edessa. The missionary movement in the East began which gradually spread throughout Mesopotamia and Persia and by AD 280. While the rulers of the Second Persian Empire (227-640) also followed a policy of religious toleration, to begin with, they later gave the largely Assyrian Christians the same status as a subject race. These rulers encouraged the revival of the ancient Persian dualistic faith of Zoroastrianism and established it as the state religion, with the result that the Christians were increasingly subjected to repressive measures. Nevertheless, it was not until Christianity became the state religion in the West that enmity toward Rome was focused on the Eastern Christians.

The metropolis of Seleucia assumed the title of "Catholicos", (Patriarch) and in AD 424 a council of the church at Seleucia elected the first patriarch to have jurisdiction over the whole church of the East, including India and Ceylon (Sri Lanka). The establishment of an independent patriarchate with nine subordinate metropolises contributed to a more favorable attitude by the Persian government, which no longer had to fear an ecclesiastical alliance with the common enemy, Rome.

==== Fourth-century persecution ====
When Constantine converted to Christianity, and the Roman Empire which was previously violently anti-Christian became pro-Christian, the Persian Empire, suspecting a new "enemy within", became violently anti-Christian. The great persecution fell upon the Christians in Persia about the year 340. Though the religious motives were never unrelated, the primary cause of the persecution was political.

It was about 315 that an ill-advised letter from the Christian emperor Constantine to his Persian counterpart Shapur II probably triggered the beginnings of an ominous change in the Persian attitude toward Christians. Constantine believed he was writing to help his fellow believers in Persia but succeeded only in exposing them. He wrote to the young shah:

I rejoice to hear that the fairest provinces of Persia are adorned with...Christians...Since you are so powerful and pious, I commend them to your care, and leave them in your protection". It was enough to make any Persian ruler conditioned by 300 years of war with Rome suspicious of the emergence of a fifth column. Any lingering doubts must have been dispelled when about twenty years later when Constantine began to gather his forces for war in the East. Eusebius records that Roman bishops were prepared to accompany their emperor to "battle with him and for him by prayers to God whom all victory proceeds". And across the border in Persian territory the forthright Persian preacher Aphrahat recklessly predicted on the basis of his reading of Old Testament prophecy that Rome would defeat Persia.

It is little wonder then, that when the persecutions began shortly thereafter, the first accusation brought against the Christians was that they were aiding the Roman enemy. Shah Shapur II's response was to order double taxation on Christians and to hold the bishop responsible for collecting it. He knew they were poor and that the bishop would be hard-pressed to find the money. Bishop Simon refused to be intimidated. He branded the tax as unjust and declared, "I am no tax collector but a shepherd of the Lord's flock." Then the killings began.

A second decree ordered the destruction of churches and the execution of clergy who refused to participate in the national worship of the sun. Bishop Simon was seized and brought before the shah and was offered gifts to make a token obeisance to the sun, and when he refused, they cunningly tempted him with the promise that if he alone would apostatize his people would not be harmed, but that if he refused he would be condemning not just the church leaders but all Christians to destruction. At that, the Christians themselves rose up and refused to accept such deliverance as shameful. So according to the tradition in the year 344, he was led outside the city of Susa along with a large number of Christian clergy. Five bishops and one hundred priests were beheaded before his eyes, and last of all he himself was put to death.

For the next two decades and more, Christians were tracked down and hunted from one end of the empire to the other. At times the pattern was a general massacre. More often, as Shapur decreed, it was intensively organized elimination of the leadership of the church, the clergy. The third category of suppression was the search for that part of the Christian community that was most vulnerable to persecution, Persians who had been converted from the national religion, Zoroastrianism. As we have already seen, the faith had spread first among non-Persian elements in the population, Jews and Syrians. But by the beginning of the 4th century, Iranians in increasing numbers were attracted to the Christian faith. For such converts, church membership could mean the loss of everything – family, property rights, and life itself. Converts from the "national faith" had no rights and, in the darker years of the persecution, were often put to death. Sometime before the death of Shapur II in 379, the intensity of the persecution slackened. Tradition calls it forty-year persecution, lasting from 339 to 379 and ending only with Shapur's death.

=== Caucasus ===
Christianity became the official religion of Armenia in 301 or 314, when Christianity was still illegal in the Roman Empire. Some claim the Armenian Apostolic Church was founded by Gregory the Illuminator of the late third – early fourth centuries while they trace their origins to the missions of Bartholomew the Apostle and Thaddeus (Jude the Apostle) in the 1st century.

Christianity in Georgia (ancient Iberia) extends back to the 4th century, if not earlier. The Iberian king, Mirian III, converted to Christianity, probably in 326.

=== Aksum Empire (Eritrea and Ethiopia ) ===
According to the fourth-century Western historian Rufinius, it was Frumentius who brought Christianity to Ethiopia (the city of Axum) and served as its first bishop, probably shortly after 325.

=== Germanic peoples ===
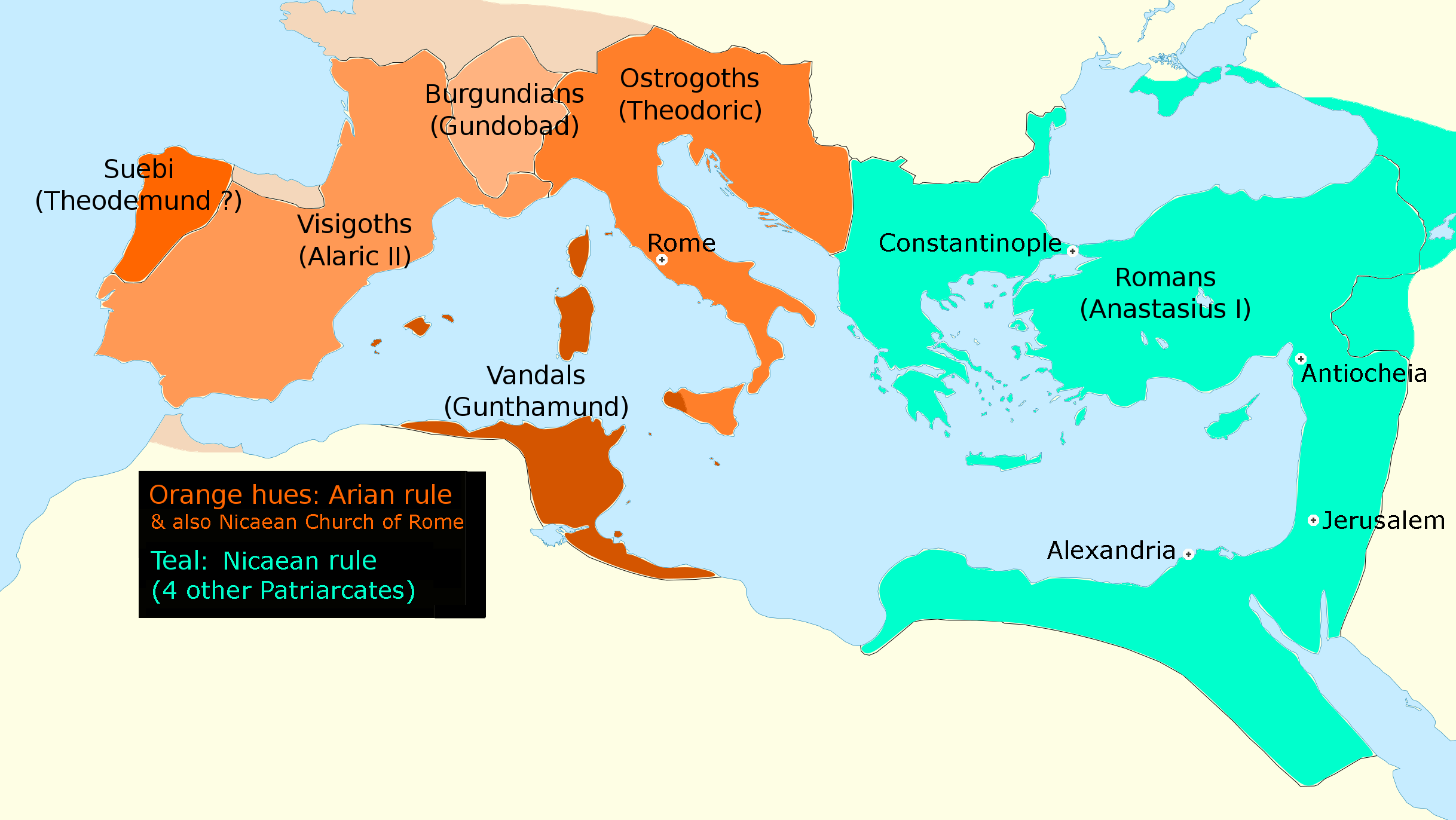
Christian states in 495 AD

The Germanic people underwent gradual Christianization from Late Antiquity. In the 4th century, the early process of Christianization of the various Germanic people was partly facilitated by the prestige of the Christian Roman Empire amongst European pagans. Until the decline of the Roman Empire, the Germanic tribes who had migrated there (with the exceptions of the Saxons, Franks, and Lombards, see below) had converted to Christianity. A number of them, notably the Goths and Vandals, adopted Arianism instead of the Trinitarian (a.k.a. Nicene or orthodox) beliefs that were dogmatically defined by the Church Fathers in the Nicene Creed and Council of Chalcedon. The gradual rise of Germanic Christianity was, at times, voluntary, particularly amongst groups associated with the Roman Empire.

From the 6th century AD, Germanic tribes were converted (and re-converted) by missionaries of the Catholic Church.

Many Goths converted to Christianity as individuals outside the Roman Empire. Most members of other tribes converted to Christianity when their respective tribes settled within the Empire, and most Franks and Anglo-Saxons converted a few generations later. During the later centuries following the Fall of Rome, as schism between the dioceses loyal to the Pope of Rome in the West and those loyal to the other Patriarchs in the East, most of the Germanic peoples (excepting the Crimean Goths and a few other eastern groups) would gradually become strongly allied with the Catholic Church in the West, particularly as a result of the reign of Charlemagne.

==== Goths ====
In the 3rd century, East-Germanic peoples migrated into Scythia. Gothic culture and identity emerged from various East-Germanic, local, and Roman influences. In the same period, Gothic raiders took captives among the Romans, including multiple Christians, (and Roman-supported raiders took captives among the Goths).

Wulfila or Ulfilas was the son or grandson of Christian captives from Sadagolthina in Cappadocia. In 337 or 341, Wulfila became the first bishop of the (Christian) Goths. By 348, one of the (Pagan) Gothic kings (reikos) began persecuting the Christian Goths, and Wulfila and a number of other Christian Goths fled to Moesia Secunda (in modern Bulgaria) in the Roman Empire. Other Christians, including Wereka, Batwin, and Saba, died in later persecutions.

Between 348 and 383, Wulfila translated the Bible into the Gothic language. Thus some Arian Christians in the west used the vernacular languages, in this case including Gothic and Latin, for services, as did Christians in the eastern Roman provinces, while most Christians in the western provinces used Latin.

==== Franks & Alemanni ====
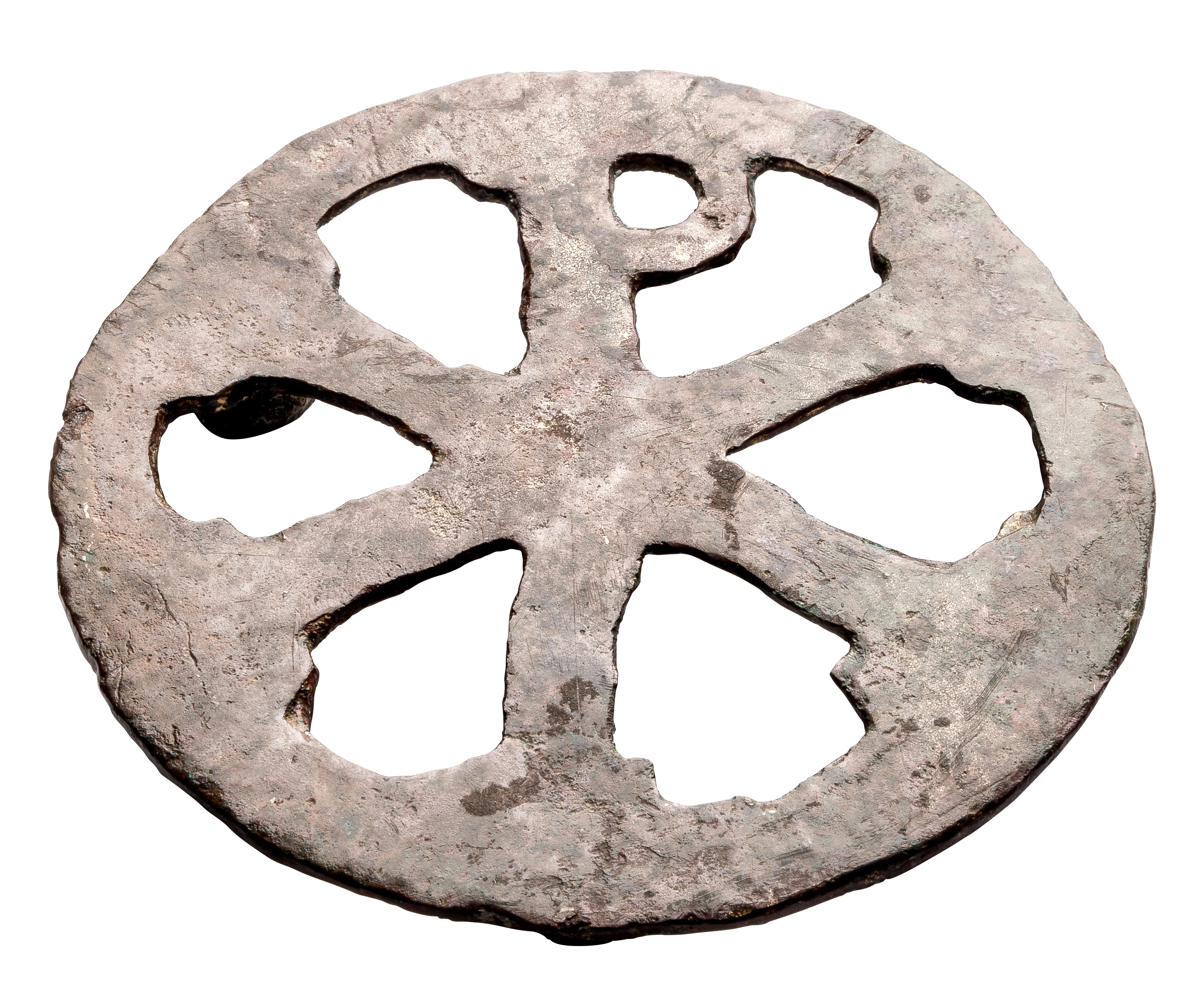
Roman Chi Rho applique in bronze found in a Germanic settlement in Neerharen (Belgium), 375-450 CE, Gallo-Roman Museum (Tongeren)

The Franks and their ruling Merovingian dynasty, that had migrated to Gaul from the 3rd century had remained pagan at first. On Christmas 496, however, Clovis I following his victory at the Battle of Tolbiac converted to the orthodox faith of the Catholic Church and let himself be baptised at Rheims. The details of this event have been passed down by Gregory of Tours.

== Outside the Roman Empire ==
Christianity spread to other great pre-modern states, including the Kingdom of Aksum where as in the Roman Empire, in Armenia, and in Georgia, it became the state religion; in these areas it thrives to the present day. In others, such as the Sasanian Empire, the Tang dynasty in China, the Mongol Empire, and in other areas, despite widespread success, it never became the state religion and is now practiced by small minorities.

== See also ==
- Christian mission
- Christianity and colonialism
- Forced conversion#Christianity

== Sources ==
Published sources

- Brown, Leslie W. (1956). The Indian Christians of St Thomas, an Account of the Ancient Syrian Church of Malabar. Cambridge: University Press.
- Burkett, Delbert (2002), An Introduction to the New Testament and the Origins of Christianity, Cambridge University Press, ISBN 978-0-521-00720-7
- Cohen, Shaye J.D. (1987), From the Maccabees to the Mishnah, The Westminster Press, ISBN 0-664-25017-3
- Cross, F. L.; Livingstone, E. A., eds. (2005), The Oxford Dictionary of the Christian Church (3rd Revised ed.), Oxford: Oxford University Press, doi:10.1093/acref/9780192802903.001.0001, ISBN 978-0-19-280290-3
- Van Daalen, D. H. (1972), The Real Resurrection, London: Collins
- Dunn, James D. G. (1982), The New Perspective on Paul. Manson Memorial Lecture, 4 november 1982
- Dunn, James D. G. (2009), Christianity in the Making: Beginning from Jerusalem, vol. 2, Wm. B. Eerdmans Publishing, ISBN 978-0-8028-3932-9
- Durant, Will (2011). Caesar and Christ: The Story of Civilization. Simon and Schuster. ISBN 978-1-4516-4760-0.
- Ehrman, Bart (2012), Did Jesus Exist?: The Historical Argument for Jesus of Nazareth, Harper Collins, ISBN 978-0-06-208994-6
- Ehrman, Bart (2014), How Jesus became God: The Exaltation of a Jewish Preacher from Galilee, Harper Collins
- Finlan, Stephen (2004), The Background and Content of Paul's Cultic Atonement Metaphors, Society of Biblical Literature
- Fredriksen, Paula (2018), When Christians Were Jews: The First Generation, New Haven and London: Yale University Press, ISBN 978-0-300-19051-9
- Grant, M. (1977), Jesus: An Historian's Review of the Gospels, New York: Scribner's
- Koester, Helmut (2000), Introduction to the New Testament, Vol. 2: History and Literature of Early Christianity, Walter de Gruyter
- Kremer, Jakob (1977), Die Osterevangelien – Geschichten um Geschichte (in German), Stuttgart: Katholisches Bibelwerk
- Mack, Burton L. (1995), Who wrote the New Testament? The making of the Christian myth, Harper San Francisco, ISBN 978-0-06-065517-4
- Maier, P. L. (1975), "The Empty Tomb as History", Christianity Today
- McGrath, Alister E. (2006), Christianity: An Introduction, Wiley-Blackwell, ISBN 1-4051-0899-1
- Stendahl, Krister (July 1963). "The Apostle Paul and the Introspective Conscience of the West" (PDF). Harvard Theological Review. 56 (3). Cambridge: Cambridge University Press on behalf of the Harvard Divinity School: 199–215. doi:10.1017/S0017816000024779. ISSN 1475-4517. JSTOR 1508631. LCCN 09003793. S2CID 170331485. Archived (PDF) from the original on 24 December 2021.
- Vermes, Geza (2008a), The Resurrection, London: Penguin, ISBN 9780141912639
- Vidmar (2005), The Catholic Church Through the Ages

Web-sources
