= Islamic fundamentalism =

Ideology which seeks to return to the fundamentals of Islam

Islamic fundamentalism has been defined as a revivalist and reform movement of Muslims who aim to return to the founding scriptures of Islam. The term has been used interchangeably with similar terms such as Islamism, Islamic revivalism, the Salafi movement, Qutbism, Islamic activism, among others, and has been criticized as pejorative.

Some of the beliefs attributed to Islamic fundamentalists are that the primary sources of Islam (the Quran, Hadith, and Sunnah), should be interpreted in a literal and originalist way; that corrupting non-Islamic influences should be eliminated from every part of Muslims' lives; and that the societies, economies, and governance of Muslim-majority countries should return to the fundamentals of Islam, the system of Islam, and become Islamic states.

== Definitions and descriptions ==
The term fundamentalism has been deemed misleading by those who suggest that all mainstream Muslims believe in the literal divine origin and perfection of the Quran and are therefore "fundamentalists", and others who believe it is a term that is used by outsiders in order to describe perceived trends within Islam. A professor of religious studies at Georgetown University, John L. Esposito, criticized the usage of the term "Islamic Fundamentalism" due to its ambiguous nature; asserting that the linguistic deployment of the term has been heavily influenced through Western-centric lens of Christian presuppositions. According to him, the more appropriate terms would be "Islamic revivalism" and "Islamic activism", since the traditions of Tajdid (revival) and Islah (reform) are rooted within the Islamic religious history, from the early Islamic centuries to the contemporary times. During the 1990s, the post-Soviet states used "Islamic fundamentalism" as a synonym for "Wahhabism".

Some 20th century preachers and writers sometimes dubbed Islamic fundamentalist include Sayyid Qutb, Ibn Saud, Abul Ala Mawdudi, and Israr Ahmed. The Wahhabi movement and its funding by Saudi Arabia is often described as being responsible for the popularity of contemporary Islamic fundamentalism.

Definitions vary as to what Islamic fundamentalism exactly is and how it differs from Islamism (or political Islam) or Islamic revivalism.

- Form of Islamism – Graham Fuller believes that Islamic fundamentalism is a subset of Islamism rather than a distinctive form of it, and to him, Islamic fundamentalists are "the most conservative element among Islamists". Its "strictest form" includes "Wahhabism, which is sometimes referred to as salafiyya. ... For fundamentalists the law is the most essential component of Islam, and it leads to an overwhelming emphasis upon jurisprudence, usually narrowly conceived." Author Olivier Roy takes a similar line, describing "neo-fundamentalists", (i.e. contemporary fundamentalists) as being more passionate than earlier Islamists in their opposition to the perceived "corrupting influence of Western culture", avoiding Western dress, "neckties, laughter, the use of Western forms of salutation, handshakes, applause", discouraging but not forbidding other activities such as sports, ideally limiting the Muslim public space to "the family and the mosque". In this fundamentalists have "drifted" away from the stand of the Islamists of the 1970s and 1980s, such as [Abul A'la Maududi] who:

...didn't hesitate to attend Hindu ceremonies. Khomeini never proposed giving Iranian Christians and Jews the status of dhimmi (protected communities) as provided for in the sharia: the Armenians of Iran have remained Iranian citizens, are required to perform military service and pay the same taxes as Muslims, and have the right to vote (with separate electoral colleges). Similarly, the Afghan Jamaat, in its statutes, has declared it legal to employ non-Muslims as experts in the eyes of Islam.

- Umbrella term – Another American observer, Robert Pelletreau, Jr., Assistant Secretary of State for Near Eastern Affairs, believes it the other way around, Islamism being the subset of Muslims "with political goals ... within" the "broader fundamentalist revival". American historian Ira Lapidus sees Islamic fundamentalism as "an umbrella designation for a very wide variety of movements, some intolerant and exclusivist, some pluralistic; some favourable to science, some anti-scientific; some primarily devotional and some primarily political; some democratic, some authoritarian; some pacific, some violent."
- Synonym – Still another, Martin Kramer, sees little difference between the two terms (at least in usage in one country): "To all intents and purposes, Islamic fundamentalism and Islamism have become synonyms in contemporary American usage."
- Scriptural literalism – According to another academic, Natana J. Delong-Bas, the contemporary use of the term Islamic fundamentalism applies to Muslims who seek not just "to return to the primary sources", but who use "a literal interpretation of those sources".
- Use of ijtihad in Islamic law – According to academic John Esposito, one of the most defining features of Islamic fundamentalism is belief in the "reopening" of the gates of ijtihad ("independent reasoning" used in reaching a legal decision in Sunni law).

=== Differences with Islamism ===
According to Roy distinctions between Fundamentalism and Islamism (or at least pre-1990 Islamism) are in the fields of:

- Politics and economics. Islamists often talk of "revolution" and they believe "that the society will only be Islamized through social and political action: it is necessary to leave the mosque ..." Fundamentalists are primarily interested in Islamic practice, less interested in "modernity or Western models of politics or economics", and less willing to associate with non-Muslims.
- Sharia. While both Islamists and fundamentalists are committed to implementing Sharia law, Islamists "tend to consider it more a project than a corpus."
- Issue of women. "Islamists generally tend to favour the education of women and their participation in social and political life: the Islamist woman militates, studies, and has the right to work, but in a chador. Islamist groups include women's associations." While the fundamentalist preaches that women should return to their homes, Islamism believes that it is sufficient if "the sexes are separated in public".
- Variety and diversity within Islamic social movements has been highlighted by Husnul Amin in his work by referring to plurality within these movements.

Historian Ervand Abrahamian (who essentially devoted a book—Khomeinism: Essays on the Islamic Republic—to why Ayatollah Ruhollah Khomeini, leader of the Iranian Revolution, was not a fundamentalist but a populist, and calls the term "Islamic fundamentalism" in general "not only confusing but also misleading and even downright wrong"), notes that in the Islamic Republic of Iran, supporters of Ayatollah Ruhollah Khomeini "finding no equivalent in Persian or Arabic" for fundamentalist, "have proudly coined a new word, bonyadegar, by translating literally the English term fundamental-ist."

=== Differences from Christian fundamentalism ===
Differences between Christian fundamentalism and Islamic fundamentalism include (according to Bernard Lewis):

"In western usage, these words [Revivalism and Fundamentalism] have a rather specific connotation; they suggest a certain type of religiosity- emotional indeed sentimental; not intellectual, perhaps even anti-intellectual; and in general apolitical and even anti-political. Fundamentalists are against liberal theology and biblical criticism and in favor of a return to fundamentals-i.e. to the divine inerrant text of the scriptures. For the so call fundamentalists of Islam these are not and never have been the issues. Liberal theology has not hitherto made much headway in Islam, and the divinity and inerrancy of the Quran are still central dogmas of the faith ... Unlike their Christian namesakes, the Islamic fundamentalists do not set aside but on the contrary embrace much of the post-scriptural scholastic tradition of their faith, in both its theological and its legal aspects."

=== Types ===
Islamic fundamentalism (at least among Sunni Muslims) traditionally tends to fall into "traditionalist" (Doctrinists) and "reformist" (Originalists) tendencies:

- Traditionalists (Doctrinists) accept "the continuity" between the founding Islamic "texts"—the Quran and the Sunnah—and their commentaries. Traditionalists take "imitation" (taqlid), accepting what was said before and refusing to innovate (bidah), as a "basic principle, They follow one of the great schools of religious jurisprudence (Shafi'i, Maliki, Hanafi, Hanbali). Their vision of the sharia is essentially legalistic and used to determine what is religiously right or wrong for Enjoining good and forbidding wrong. Traditionalists are sometimes connected to the popular forms of Sufism such as the Barelvi school in Pakistan)."
- "Reformist" (Originalists) fundamentalism, in contrast, "criticizes the tradition, the commentaries, popular religious practices" (Maraboutism, the cult of saints), "deviations, and superstitions"; it aims to cleanse Islam by returning to the Quran and the Sunnah. 18th-century examples are Shah Waliullah Dehlawi in India and Ibn Abdul Wahhab in the Arabian Peninsula. This reformism is often "developed in response to an external threat" such as "the influence of Hinduism on Islam". In the late 19th century, the salafiyya movement spread throughout the Arab countries; "marking a phase between Fundamentalism and Islamism". Sayyid Rashid Rida (1865–1935), a major scholar of the early Salafiyya, believed that the triumphs of early generations of Muslims (Salaf) were God's reward for them being faithful followers and blamed contemporary decline of Muslims on four major factors: i) European imperialism ii) Western philosophy iii) neglect of the correct practice of Islam iv) Raafidi doctrines

=== Controversy ===
==== Criticism of the term ====
The term "Islamic fundamentalism" has been criticized by Bernard Lewis, Khaled Abou El Fadl, Eli Berman, and John Esposito, among others. Many have proposed replacing it with another term, such as "puritanical", "Islamic revivalism" or "activism", and "radical Islam".

Lewis, a leading historian of Islam, believes that although "the use of this term is established and must be accepted":

It remains unfortunate and can be misleading. "Fundamentalist" is a Christian term. It seems to have come into use in the early years of the last century, and it denotes certain Protestant churches and organizations, more particularly, those that maintain the literal divine origin and inerrancy of the Bible. In this, they oppose the liberal and modernist theologians, who tend to have a more critical, historical view of Scripture. Among Muslim theologians, there is as yet no such liberal or modernist approach to the Qur'an, and all Muslims, in their attitude to the text of the Qur'an, are in principle at least fundamentalists. Where the so-called Muslim fundamentalists differ from other Muslims and indeed from Christian fundamentalists is in their scholasticism and their legalism. They base themselves not only on the Qur'an, but also on the Traditions of the Prophet, and on the corpus of transmitted theological and legal learning.

John Esposito has attacked the term for its association "with political activism, extremism, fanaticism, terrorism, and anti-Americanism", saying "I prefer to speak of Islamic revivalism and Islamic activism."

Khaled Abou El Fadl of UCLA, a critic of those who are called Islamic fundamentalists, also finds fault with the term because:

[M]any liberal, progressive, or moderate Muslims would describe themselves as usulis, or fundamentalist, without thinking that this carries a negative connotation. In the Islamic context, it makes much more sense to describe the fanatical reductionism and narrow-minded literalism of some groups as puritanical (a term that in the West invokes a particular historical experience)

Eli Berman argues that "radical Islam" is a better term for many post-1920s movements starting with the Muslim Brotherhood, because these movements are seen as practicing "unprecedented extremism", thus, they do not qualify as movements which are returning to the practice of historic fundamentals.

==== Defense ====
In contrast, American author Anthony J. Dennis accepts the widespread usage and relevance of the term and calls Islamic fundamentalism "more than a religion today, it is a worldwide movement." He notes the intertwining of social, religious and political goals found within the movement and states that Islamic fundamentalism "deserves to be seriously studied and debated from a secular perspective as a revolutionary ideology."

Syrian philosopher Sadiq Jalal al-Azm and Egyptian philosopher Hassan Hanafi have defended the use of the phrase. Surveying the doctrines of the new Islamic movements, Al-Azm found them to consist of "an immediate return to Islamic 'basics' and 'fundamentals'. ... It seems to me quite reasonable that calling these Islamic movements 'Fundamentalist' (and in the strong sense of the term) is adequate, accurate, and correct." Hassan Hanafi reached the same conclusion: "It is difficult to find a more appropriate term than the one recently used in the West, 'fundamentalism,' to cover the meaning of what we name Islamic awakening or revival."

=== Study ===
In 1988, the University of Chicago, backed by the American Academy of Arts and Sciences, launched The Fundamentalism Project, devoted to researching fundamentalism in the worlds major religions, Christianity, Islam, Judaism, Hinduism, Buddhism and Confucianism. It defined fundamentalism as "approach, or set of strategies, by which beleaguered believers attempt to preserve their distinctive identity as a people or group ... by a selective retrieval of doctrines, beliefs, and practices from a sacred past." A 2013 study by Wissenschaftszentrums Berlin für Sozialforschung finds that Islamic fundamentalism is widespread among European Muslims with the majority saying religious rules are more important than civil laws and three quarters rejecting religious pluralism within Islam. A recent study shows that some European Muslims perceive Western governments as inherently hostile towards Islam as a source of identity. This perception, however, declined significantly after the emergence of ISIS, especially among young and educated European Muslims.

== Origins ==
The modern Islamic fundamentalist movements have their origins in the late 19th century. According to the Arab poet Adunis, the Islamic World experienced an influx of European ideas, values and thoughts during the late nineteenth century. The thinkers in the Muslim world reacted to modernity in three major ways. Secularists like Mirza Aqa Khan Kermani, Mustafa Kemal Atatürk, etc. considered Islam to be responsible for the backwardness of Muslims; gradually abandoning religion and adopted Western ideas. Meanwhile, Modernists like Muhammad Abduh in Egypt advocated reforms to reconcile with modernity; while emphasizing adherence to basic Islamic ideals. A third current; widely known as Islamic fundamentalism, pioneered by Rashid Rida across the Arab world and Abul A'ala Mawdudi (1903–1979 CE) in South Asia, asserted that Islam is relevant for all times and must reign supreme. They idealised the era of Muhammad and his companions, and sought to revive its "purity" and early Islamic power. For them, the economic, political and military problems of the Islamic World are due to Muslim negligence in strictly adhering to the tenets of sharia.

The trajectory of Islamic fundamentalism was marked by four phases. The first phase of proto-fundamentalism emerged during the late 19th century in wake of backlash against the Western colonial onslaught. Its main representatives were the ulema of Ahl-i Hadith movement in South Asia and religious revivalists of the Arab Salafiyya and various anti-colonial trends. The anti-colonial religious activists consisted of two factions: the restorationists who kept to scriptural religious discourse, and modernists who campaigned to adopt Western ideals and institutions. The religious endeavours of the Syrian-Egyptian Salafi scholar Rashid Rida (1865–1935 CE) marks the transition from proto-fundamentalism to the second phase of Islamic fundamentalism. Rida became the first major theologian to comprehensively elucidate the foundational principles of an Islamic state in its modern iteration, and these doctrines would be readily adopted by later Islamic fundamentalists. The Wahhabi movement, an Arabian fundamentalist movement that began in the 18th century, had also gained traction and spread during the 19th and 20th centuries.

After the First World War, Rashid Rida would be highly influenced by the Hanbali puritanical and revivalist doctrines of the 13th century Hanbalite theologian Ibn Taymiyya and the Wahhabi movement; and began to ardently campaign against Western influence and modernist ideas. The ideas of Rashid Rida, who is widely regarded as the spiritual father of the Salafiyya movement, marks the rise of Islamic fundamentalist movements. He advocated fundamentalist causes through the early Islamic journal Al-Manar that operated for about thirty-five years and popularised his political theory of Islamic state after the First World War; as an alternative model against rising currents of secularism and nationalism. Influenced by Rida's ideals that campaigned for the establishment of an Islamic state in the aftermath of the abolition of the Ottoman Caliphate, popular Islamist movements such as the Muslim Brotherhood and Jamaat-e Islami carried the banner of fundamentalism during the interwar period. The Brothers incorporated the Salafiyya message into a comprehensive political programme, while the Jamaʿat envisioned an all-out battle against Western influence and culture. The combination of religion and politics offered by these movements established contemporary Islamic fundamentalism.

The emergence of the next phase occurred in the context of the de-colonialisation era following the Second World War, during which Islamic fundamentalists were persecuted by authoritarian regimes and became radicalized. The radical new teachings were epitomized in the treatises of Egyptian Islamist scholar Sayyid Qutb, which elucidated notions such as the return of the Jahiliyya (pre-Islamic barbarity). Influenced by Qutb, a number of vanguard groups sprang up which turned to violence and terror in their struggle against "apostate" regimes. In Iran, a radical Shiʿa combination of Khomeini's doctrine of wilayat-i faqih (guardianship of the jurist) and ʿAli Shariʿati's modernist social reinterpretations of the Qur’an would form the ideological basis of the 1979 Iranian revolution.

During the Cold War following World War II, some NATO governments, particularly those of the United States and the United Kingdom, launched covert and overt campaigns to encourage and strengthen fundamentalist groups in the Middle East and southern Asia. These groups were seen as a hedge against potential expansion by the Soviet Union, and as a counterweight against nationalist and socialist movements that were seen as a threat to the interests of the Western nations. By the 1970s, the Islamists had become important allies in supporting governments, such as Egypt, which were friendly to U.S. interests. By the late 1970s, however, some fundamentalist groups had become militaristic leading to threats and changes to existing regimes. The overthrow of the Shah in Iran and rise of the Ayatollah Khomeini was one of the most significant signs of this shift. Subsequently, fundamentalist forces in Algeria caused a civil war, caused a near-civil war in Egypt, and caused the downfall of the Soviet occupation in Afghanistan.

In a 2018 interview with The Washington Post, Mohammed bin Salman, the de facto ruler of Saudi Arabia, said that the International propagation of the Salafi movement and Wahhabism campaign was "rooted in the Cold War, when allies asked Saudi Arabia to use its resources to prevent inroads in Muslim countries by the Soviet Union". According to some estimates, between the 1960s and 2016, the Saudis have funnelled over US$100 billion into funding schools and mosques all over the world with the mission of spreading puritanical Wahhabi Islam. According to political scientist Alex Alexiev, the impetus for the international propagation of Salafism and Wahhabism was "the largest worldwide propaganda campaign ever mounted", David A. Kaplan described it as "dwarfing the Soviets' propaganda efforts at the height of the Cold War". In 2013, the European Parliament identified Wahhabism as the main source of global terrorism.

In the contemporary era, the term "fundamentalism" is usually applied to denote these militant Islamist vanguards; although historians like Itzchak Weismann argue that it is more accurate to describe them as its radical offshoots. Osama b. Ladin and Al-Qaʾida belong to a fourth phase of Islamic fundamentalism, known as Salafi-jihadism, a movement that strives to move the battle against "infidelity" on an international scale; since the turn of the twenty-first century.

Muslim critics of Islamic fundamentalism often draw a parallel between the modern fundamentalist movement and the 7th century Khawarij sect. From their essentially political position, the Kharijites developed extreme doctrines that set them apart from both mainstream Sunni and Shia Muslims. The Kharijites were particularly noted for adopting a radical approach to Takfir, whereby they declared other Muslims to be unbelievers and therefore deemed them worthy of death.

== Goals ==
=== Interpretation of texts ===
Islamic fundamentalists, or at least "reformist" fundamentalists, believe that Islam is based on the Qur'an, Hadith and Sunnah and "criticize the tradition, the commentaries, popular religious practices (maraboutism, the cult of saints), deviations, and superstitions. They aim to return to the founding texts." Examples of individuals who adhere to this tendency are the 18th-century Shah Waliullah in India and Muhammad ibn Abd-al-Wahhab in the Arabian Peninsula. This view is commonly associated with Salafism today.

=== Social and political ===
Along with adherents of other fundamentalist movements, Islamic fundamentalists hold the view that the problems of the world stem from secular influences.

Some scholars of Islam, such as Bassam Tibi, believe that, contrary to their own message, Islamic fundamentalists are not actually traditionalists. He refers to fatwahs which have been issued by fundamentalists such as the fatwa which states that "every Muslim who pleads for the suspension of the shari'a is an apostate and can be killed. The killing of those apostates cannot be prosecuted under Islamic law because this killing is justified" as going beyond, and unsupported by, the Qur'an. Tibi asserts, "The command to slay reasoning Muslims is un-Islamic, an invention of Islamic fundamentalists".

== Conflicts with the secular state ==
Islamic fundamentalism's push for sharia and an Islamic state has come into conflict with conceptions of the secular, democratic state, such as the internationally supported Universal Declaration of Human Rights. Anthony J. Dennis notes that "Western and Islamic visions of the state, the individual and society are not only divergent, they are often totally at odds." Among human rights fundamentalist Muslims oppose are:

- Freedom from religious police
- Equality issues between men and women (And thus fundamentalist Muslims are not feminists)
- Separation of religion and state
- Freedom of speech
- Freedom of religion

== Islamic fundamentalist states ==
The 1979 Islamic Revolution in Iran is seen as a success of Islamic fundamentalism. Saudi Arabia is also largely governed by fundamentalist principles (see Wahhabi movement) but Johannes J.G. Jansen disagrees, arguing that it is more akin to a neo-traditional Muslim state, where a power separation exists between magistrates (umarā) and clergy (ulama). In contrast, Jansen argues that Khomeini came to power by advocating the formation of a system of Islamic government where the highest level of authority is in the hands of the ulamā (see Wilayat al Faqih). A similar form of governance to Iran is Afghanistan, where power is currently vested in the clergy.

While Saudi Arabian governance is similar to neo-traditional currents in Islamic history, Iran and Afghanistan share a form of governance resembling the traditional Rashidun Caliphate where the people of religious knowledge ruled the state.

== Human rights controversy ==
Some states and movements that are perceived or claimed to be Islamic fundamentalists have been criticized for their human rights record by international organizations. The acceptance of international law on human rights has been somewhat limited even in Muslim countries that are not seen as fundamentalist. Ann Elizabeth Mayer writes that states with a predominantly Muslim population, even when they adopt laws along European lines, are influenced by Islamic rules and precepts of sharia, which cause conflict with international law on human rights. According to Mayer, features found in conflict include severe deficiencies in criminal procedure, harsh criminal penalties causing great suffering, discrimination against women and non-Muslims, and prohibition against abandoning the Islamic religion. In 1990, under Saudi leadership, the Organisation of Islamic Cooperation, a group representing all Muslim majority nations, adopted the Cairo Declaration on Human Rights in Islam, which substantially diverges from the 1948 Universal Declaration of Human Rights (UDHR). The Cairo declaration lacks provisions for democratic principles, protection for religious freedom, freedom of association and freedom of the press, as well as equality in rights and equal protection under the law. Further it stipulates that "all the rights and freedoms stipulated in this Declaration are subject to the Islamic shari'a".

The Cairo declaration followed years of limited acceptance of the Universal declaration by predominantly Muslim states. As an example, in 1984, Iran's UN representative, Said Raja'i Khorasani, said the following amid allegations of human rights violations, "[Iran] recognized no authority ... apart from Islamic law. ... Conventions, declarations and resolutions or decisions of international organizations, which were contrary to Islam, had no validity in the Islamic Republic of Iran. ... The Universal Declaration of Human Rights, which represented secular understanding of the Judaeo-Christian tradition, could not be implemented by Muslims and did not accord with the system of values recognized by the Islamic Republic of Iran; this country would therefore not hesitate to violate its provisions." These departures, both theoretical and practical, have resulted in a multitude of practices and cases criticized by international human rights groups. See human rights in Iran, human rights in Saudi Arabia, and Taliban treatment of women for specific examples.

== Opinion polling ==
- A New York Times poll found that 33% of Americans think that Muslim Americans were more "sympathetic to terrorists than other Citizens" Rik Coolsaet analysed this as indicating a high level of distrust directed at the American Muslim community. The Times did this survey during the Park51 Ground Zero Mosque incident. The Times called the findings "appalling" and also analysed the data as showing a very high level of distrust of Muslim Americans and robust disapproval of the Park51 Mosque proposal. The New Republic stated that it does not trust the poll carried out by the New York Times and that the figures would be higher than 33%. They further claimed that New York residents are tolerant and if the figures were 33% in New York then "non-New Yorker fellow citizens are far more deeply biased and warped than the Gotham locals".

== See also ==
- 2009 Diyala Province Bombing
- Ahlus Sunnah Wal Jamaah (British organisation)
- Anwar al-Awlaki
- Forced conversion in Islam
- Hindu terrorism
- Hindutva
- Hindu nationalism
- Islam and violence
- Islamic extremism
- Islamic religious police
- Religious exclusivism § Islam
- Islamic terrorism
- Mona Mahmudnizhad
- Mohammad-Taqi Mesbah-Yazdi
- Muslim patrol incidents in London
- Violence against Muslims in independent India
- Salafi
- Wahhabi movement
- Deobandi movement
