= Rodney Stark =

American sociologist of religion (1934–2022)

- Born: Rodney William Stark; July 8, 1934; Jamestown, North Dakota, United States
- Died: July 21, 2022 (aged 88); Woodway, Texas, United States

Academic background
- Education: University of Denver; University of California, Berkeley
- Thesis: Police riots: collective violence and law enforcement (1971)

Academic work
- Discipline: Religious studies; sociology
- Sub-discipline: Comparative religion; sociology of religion
- Institutions: University of Washington; Baylor University
- Notable works: The Churching of America, 1776–1990 (1990); The Rise of Christianity (1996); The Rise of Mormonism (2005)
- Notable ideas: Stark–Bainbridge theory of religion
- Influenced: Dana Evan Kaplan
- Website: www.rodneystark.com

Rodney William Stark (July 8, 1934 – July 21, 2022) was an American sociologist of religion who was a longtime professor of sociology and of comparative religion at the University of Washington. At the time of his death he was the Distinguished Professor of the Social Sciences at Baylor University, co-director of the university's Institute for Studies of Religion, and founding editor of the Interdisciplinary Journal of Research on Religion.

Stark had written over 30 books, including The Rise of Christianity (1996), and more than 140 scholarly articles on subjects as diverse as prejudice, crime, suicide, and city life in ancient Rome. He twice won the Distinguished Book Award from the Society for the Scientific Study of Religion, for The Future of Religion: Secularization, Revival, and Cult Formation (1985, with William Sims Bainbridge), and for The Churching of America 1776–1990 (1992, with Roger Finke).

== Early life and education ==
Stark was born on July 8, 1934, and grew up in Jamestown, North Dakota, in a Lutheran family. He spent time in the United States Army, before graduating in journalism from the University of Denver in 1959. He worked as a journalist for the Oakland Tribune from 1959 until 1961, then pursued graduate work, obtaining his MA in sociology from the University of California, Berkeley, in 1965 and his PhD, also from Berkeley, in 1971.

Stark played high school football with another individual who would go on to have a distinguished academic career, Alvin Plantinga, an influential Christian philosopher who taught at Calvin College and Notre Dame.

== Career and research ==
=== Positions held ===
After completing his PhD, Stark held appointments as a research sociologist at the Survey Research Center and at the Center for the Study of Law and Society. After teaching as Professor of Sociology and of Comparative Religion at the University of Washington for 32 years, Stark moved to Baylor University in 2004, where he was co-director of the Institute for Studies of Religion. He was an advocate of the application of the rational choice theory in the sociology of religion, which he called the theory of religious economy.

=== Stark–Bainbridge theory of religion ===
During the late 1970s and 1980s, Stark worked with William Sims Bainbridge on the Stark–Bainbridge theory of religion, and co-wrote the books The Future of Religion (1985) and A Theory of Religion (1987) with Bainbridge. Their theory, which aims to explain religious involvement in terms of rewards and compensators, is seen as a precursor of the more explicit recourse to economic principles in the study of religion as later developed by Laurence Iannaccone and others.

=== Criticism of secularization theories ===
Stark was one of the most vocal critics of theories of secularization. In 1999, he published an article entitled “Secularization, R.I.P.” that became both famous and controversial. He expanded his theory in subsequent works, claiming that statistical data does not support the theory of a decline of religion in modern societies. Although it is true that the forms and practices of religion change, the idea of a decline called “secularization,” Stark argued, derives from faulty quantitative analysis and ideological preconceptions.

=== On the growth of Christianity ===
Stark proposed in The Rise of Christianity that Christianity grew through gradual individual conversions via social networks of family, friends and colleagues. His main contribution, by comparing documented evidence of Christianity's spread in the Roman Empire with the history of the LDS church in the 19th and 20th centuries, was to illustrate that a sustained and continuous growth could lead to huge growth within 200 years. This use of exponential growth as a driver to explain the growth of the church without the need for mass conversions (deemed necessary by historians until then) has since been widely accepted.

Stark suggested that Christianity grew because it treated women better than pagan religions. He also suggested that making Christianity the state religion of the Roman Empire weakened the faithfulness of the Christian community by bringing in people who did not really believe or had a weaker belief. This is consistent with Stark's published observations of contemporary religious movements, where once-successful faith movements gradually decline in fervor due to the free rider problem.

=== Criticism of anti-Catholicism ===
While not a Roman Catholic himself, Stark believed that anti-Catholicism is still a dominant force in the American media and the academia. Particularly in his book Bearing False Witness (2016), he argued that an anti-Catholic prejudice has poisoned the historical debate on the Crusades, the Inquisition and the relations of Pope Pius XII with Nazism, creating an "anti-Catholic history" that is at odds with contemporary academic research, yet is still taught in schools and promoted by mainline media.

=== On the theory of evolution ===
In 2004 The American Enterprise, an online publication of the American Enterprise Institute, published an article by Stark, "Facts, Fable and Darwin", critical of the stifling of debate on evolution. Stark criticized the "Darwinian Crusade" and their "tactic of claiming that the only choice is between Darwin and Bible literalism." Though not a creationist himself, he believed that though "the theory of evolution is regarded as the invincible challenge to all religious claims, it is taken for granted among the leading biological scientists that the origin of species has yet to be explained." He suggested that governments "lift the requirement that high school texts enshrine Darwin's failed attempt as an eternal truth."

== Personal religious faith ==
In their 1987 book A Theory of Religion, Stark and Bainbridge describe themselves as "personally incapable of religious faith". While reluctant to discuss his own religious views, he stated in a 2004 interview that he was not a man of faith, but also not an atheist. In a 2007 interview, after accepting an appointment at Baylor University, Stark indicated that his self-understanding had changed and that he could be described as an "independent Christian." In this interview Stark recollects that he has "always been a 'cultural' Christian" understood by him as having "been strongly committed to Western Civilization." Of his previous positions he wrote: "I was never an atheist, but I probably could have been best described as an agnostic."

== Selected works ==
=== Books ===
- Christian Beliefs and Anti-Semitism (1966), with Charles Y. Glock ISBN 978-0060323554
- American Piety: The Nature of Religious Commitment (1968), with Charles Y. Glock ISBN 978-0520017566
- The Future of Religion: Secularization, Revival, and Cult Formation (1985), with William Sims Bainbridge ISBN 978-0520048546
- Sociology (1985) an introductory college sociology text that has been through ten editions as of 2007. 10th: (2006) ISBN 0495093440
- A Theory of Religion (1987), with William Sims Bainbridge (OL 2375931M)
- Religion, Deviance, and Social Control (1996), with William Sims Bainbridge
- The Churching of America 1776–1992: Winners and Losers in Our Religious Economy (1992), with Roger Finke; 2nd edition under name The Churching of America 1776–2005: Winners and Losers in Our Religious Economy (2005)
- The Rise of Christianity: A Sociologist Reconsiders History (1996) ISBN 978-0691027494 or How the Obscure, Marginal Jesus Movement Became the Dominant Religious Force in the Western World in a Few Centuries (1997) ISBN 978-0060677015
- Acts of Faith: Explaining the Human Side of Religion (2000), with Roger Finke. University of California Press
- One True God: Historical Consequences of Monotheism (2001), ISBN 978-0691115009
- For the Glory of God: How Monotheism Led to Reformations, Science, Witch-Hunts, and the End of Slavery. Description, reviews, & contents. (2003), ISBN 978-0691114361
- Exploring the Religious Life (2004) ISBN 0801878446
- The Victory of Reason: How Christianity Led to Freedom, Capitalism, and Western Success (2005), ISBN 0812972333
- The Rise of Mormonism (2005), ISBN 023113634X
- Cities of God: The Real Story of How Christianity Became an Urban Movement and Conquered Rome (2006)
- Discovering God: A New Look at the Origins of the Great Religions or The Origins of the Great Religions and the Evolution of Belief (2007), ISBN 978-0061173899
- God's Battalions: The Case for the Crusades (2009) ISBN 978-0061582615
- The Triumph of Christianity: How the Jesus Movement Became the World's Largest Religion (2011), ISBN 0062007688
- America's Blessings: How Religion Benefits Everyone, Including Atheists (2012)
- How the West Won: The Neglected Story of the Triumph of Modernity (2014), Intercollegiate Studies Institute, ISBN 1610170857
- Religious Hostility: A Global Assessment of Hatred and Terror (2014), with Katie E. Corcoran
- A Star in the East: The Rise of Christianity in China (2015), with Xiuhua Wang. ISBN 978-1599475172
- The Triumph of Faith: Why The World Is More Religious Than Ever (2015) ISBN 1610171381
- Bearing False Witness: Debunking Centuries of Anti-Catholic History (2016) ISBN 1599474999
- Reformation Myths: Five Centuries of Misconceptions and (Some) Misfortunes (2017) ISBN 0281078270
- Why God? Explaining Religious Phenomena (2018) ISBN 1599475537

=== Articles ===
- John Lofland and Rodney Stark. Becoming a World-Saver: A Theory of Conversion to a Deviant Perspective American Sociological Review of 1965. (an early and influential conversion theory based on field work among Unification Church members)
- "A Taxonomy of Religious Experience" in The Journal for the Scientific Study of Religion, 1965
- Rodney Stark and William Sims Bainbridge (1979) "Of Churches, Sects, and Cults: Preliminary Concepts for a Theory of Religious Movements" Journal for the Scientific Study of Religion 18, no 2: 117–133
- Rodney Stark. "On Theory-Driven Methods." pp. 175–196 in The Craft of Religious Studies, edited by Jon R. Stone. New York: St. Martin's Press, 1998.
- Stark, R., “Fact, Fable and Darwin” in One America, September 2004; Part 1 in and Part 2 , as printed in Meridian Magazine, 2005

== See also ==
- The Pacific Sociological Association Distinguished Scholarship Award
- Religious capital, an idea used frequently in Stark's work
