= William Sims Bainbridge =

American sociologist (born 1940)

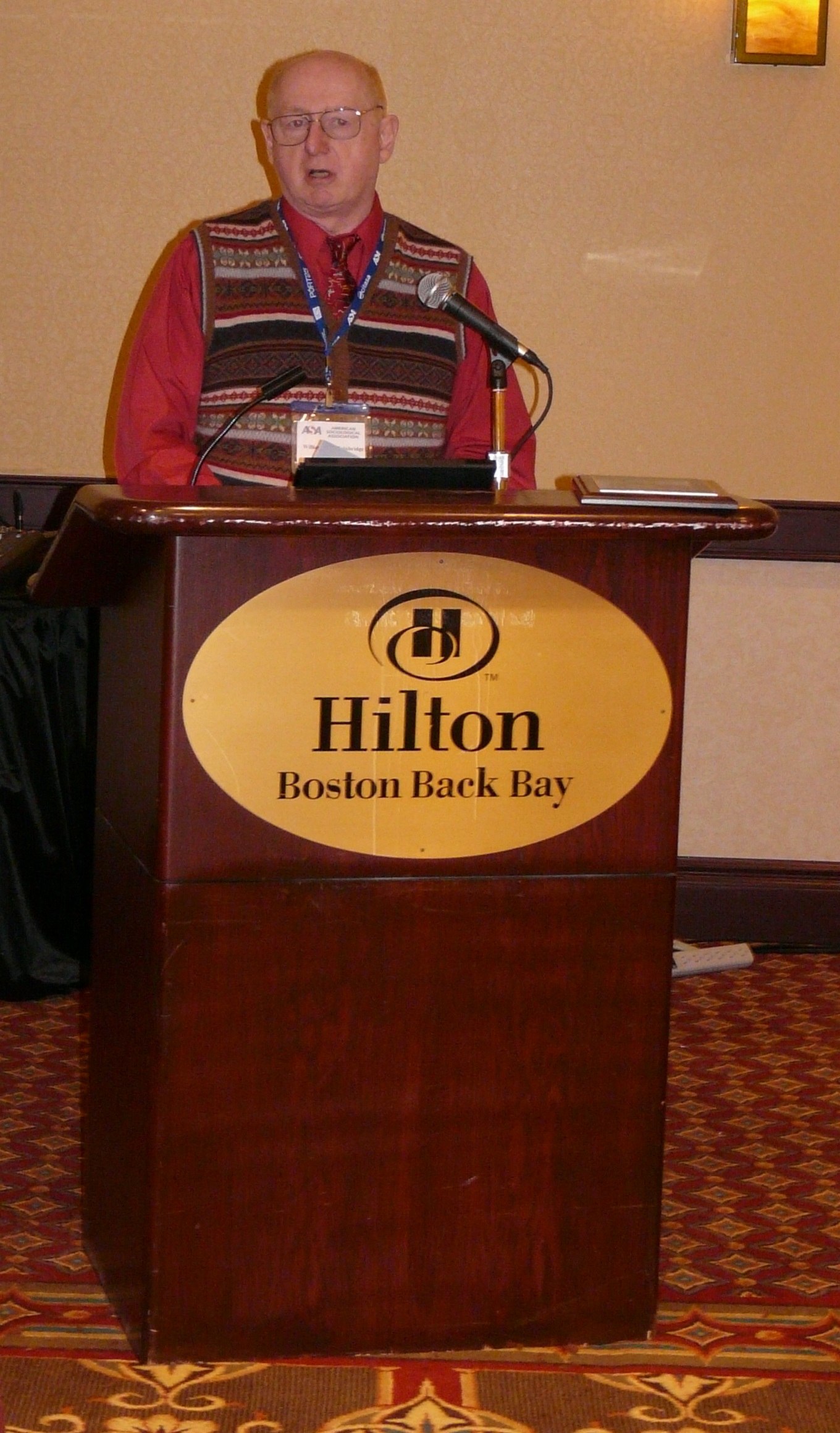
- Award ceremony for William Sims Bainbridge held by the CITASA section of ASA. 2008 in Boston.
- Born: October 12, 1940 (age 85)

Academic background
- Education: Harvard University (Ph.D.)

Academic work
- Discipline: Sociologist

William Sims Bainbridge (born October 12, 1940) is an American sociologist who currently resides in Virginia. He is co-director of Cyber-Human Systems at the National Science Foundation (NSF). He is the first Senior Fellow to be appointed by the Institute for Ethics and Emerging Technologies. Bainbridge is most well known for his work on the sociology of religion. Beginning in the 2010s he has published work studying the sociology of video gaming.

== Career ==
Bainbridge began his academic career at the Choate Rosemary Hall preparatory school in his birthstate of Connecticut. He matriculated at Yale University and Oberlin College before settling on Boston University, where he received his B.A. in sociology in 1971. Initially, he studied music and became a skilled piano-tuner. In his free time, he constructed harpsichords and clavichords with the "Bainbridge" name, which still exist in a few households.

Bainbridge received his Ph.D. in sociology at Harvard University in 1975 and went on to study the sociology of religious cults. In 1976, he published his first book, The Spaceflight Revolution, which examined the push for space exploration in the 1960s. In 1978, he published his second and most popular book, entitled Satan's Power, which described several years in which Bainbridge infiltrated and observed the Process Church, a religious cult whose founders had been members of Scientology. The study was one of the last of this type of academic studies done before new rules were introduced restricting unregulated participatory observation and study.

After completing his doctorate, Bainbridge served as an assistant (1975–1980) and associate professor (1980–1982) of sociology at the University of Washington. During this period, he worked with departmental colleague Rodney Stark on the Stark-Bainbridge theory of religion. Upon returning to Harvard as a visiting associate professor of sociology (1982–1987), he co-wrote the books The Future of Religion (1985) and A Theory of Religion (1987) with Stark. As of 2013, their theory, which aims to explain religious involvement in terms of rewards and compensators, is seen as a precursor of the more explicit recourse to economic principles in the study of religion later developed by Laurence Iannaccone and others.

From this period until the 2000s Bainbridge published more books dealing with space, religion, and psychology. These included a text entitled Experiments in Psychology (1986), which included psychology experimentation software coded by Bainbridge. He also studied the religious cult the Children of God, also known as the Family International, in his 2002 book The Endtime Family: Children of God.

Bainbridge has also taught at Illinois State University (professor of sociology and anthropology; 1987–1990) and Towson University (professor of sociology and anthropology & department chair; 1990–1992). He then joined the National Science Foundation as the director of its sociology program (1992–1999) before holding a series of positions that prefigured his current appointment in 2006.

== Bibliography ==
Books authored by Bainbridge include:

- The Sacred Force of Star Wars Jedi (2024),
- Cultural Science: Applications of Artificial Social Intelligence (2020),
- The Social Structure of Online Communities (2020),
- Virtual Local Manufacturing Communities: Online Simulations of Future Workshop Systems (2019),
- Family History Digital Libraries (2018),
- Computer Simulation of Space Societies (2018),
- Dynamic Secularization: Information Technology and the Tension Between Religion and Science (2017). ISBN 978-3-319-56502-6
- Star Worlds: Freedom Versus Control in Online Gameworlds (2016),
- The Meaning and Value of Spaceflight (2015),
- An Information Technology Surrogate for Religion (2014),
- Personality Capture and Emulation (2014),
- eGods: Faith versus Fantasy in Computer Gaming (2013),
- The Virtual Future (2011),
- Online Multiplayer Games (2010),
- The Warcraft Civilization: Social Science in a Virtual World (2010),
- Nanoconvergence (2007),
- The Secular Abyss (2007),
- God from the Machine: Artificial Intelligence Models of Religious Cognition (2006),
- The Endtime Family: Children of God (2002),
- Sociology (1997),
- The Sociology of Religious Movements (1997),
- Religion, Deviance and Social Control (with Rodney Stark) (1996),
- Social Research Methods and Statistics (1992),
- Goals in Space: American Values and the Future of Technology (1991),
- Survey Research: A Computer-Assisted Introduction (1989),
- Sociology Laboratory (1987)
- A Theory of Religion (with Rodney Stark) (1987) (OL 2375931M) (Reprinted in 1996 and translated into Polish as Teoria Religi in 2000)
- Dimensions of Science Fiction (1986).
- Experiments in Psychology (1986)
- The Future of Religion (with Rodney Stark) (1985)
- Satan's Power: A Deviant Psychotherapy Cult (1978).
- The Spaceflight Revolution (1976).

In addition, The Future of Religion was reprinted in Chinese in 2006 and Satan's Power: A Deviant Psychotherapy Cult was translated into Italian in 1994.

Bainbridge's edited and co-edited books include:

- Handbook of Science and Technology Convergence (with Mihail C. Roco) (2016)
- Convergence of Knowledge, Technology and Society (with Mihail C. Roco, Bruce Tonn, George Whitesides) (2013)
- Leadership in Science and Technology (2012)
- Progress in Convergence: Technologies for Human Wellbeing (with Mihail C. Roco) (2006)
- Nanotechnology: Societal Implications—Maximizing Benefit for Humanity (with Mihail C. Roco) (2006)
- Nanotechnology: Societal Implications—Individual Perspectives (with Mihail C. Roco) (2006)
- Managing Nano-Bio-Info-Cogno Innovations: Converging Technologies in Society (with Mihail C. Roco) (2006)
- Encyclopedia of Human-Computer Interaction (2004)
- Converging Technologies for Improving Human Performance (with Mihail C. Roco) (2003)
- Societal Implications of Nanoscience and Nanotechnology (with Mihail C. Roco) (2001).

In addition to his books, Bainbridge has published over 200 articles and essays in various journals and encyclopedias. From 2013, when he published eGods, his work has shifted towards the study of the sociology of video gaming, beginning with the publication of a new article (co-authored with his daughter Wilma Alice Bainbridge) on the potentially interesting aspects of glitches in video games. He has also studied "personality capture" in software, the process by which one may save one's personality in a computer through the answering of vast personality surveys.

== Awards and organizations ==
The Future of Religion won the "Outstanding Book of the Year" award from the Society for the Scientific Study of Religion in 1986 and A Theory of Religion won the "Outstanding Scholarship" from the Pacific Sociological Association in 1993.

Bainbridge is a founding member of the Order of Cosmic Engineers and is distantly related to Commodore William Bainbridge.

== See also ==
- Rodney Stark
