= The Rise of Mormonism =

Book by Rodney Stark

- Author: Rodney Stark
- Language: English
- Subject: Mormonism
- Published: 2005
- Publication place: United States
- Media type: Print

The Rise of Mormonism is a 2005 book by the sociologist of religions Rodney Stark. It was reviewed in a number of scholarly journals.

== Editions ==
- Stark, Rodney (2005). The Rise of Mormonism. New York: Columbia University Press. ISBN 0-231-13634-X.
