= Eli Berman =

American economist

- Born: 1960 (age 65–66); Ottawa, Ontario, Canada
- Known for: Rational models for behavior of extremist groups

Eli Berman (born 1960) is the Research Director for International Security Studies at the UC Institute on Global Conflict and Cooperation and since 2010 a Professor of economics at the University of California, San Diego. He is known for his work applying rational choice analysis to the behavior of radical religious groups.

== Research ==
=== On violent radical religious groups ===
Berman argues that economics can provide a significant insight into the vulnerabilities of radical and terrorist organizations, although not only because of the common assumption that cutting their funding is key to their defeat. Instead Berman says that "terrorist organizations are terribly vulnerable to defection, the same way that firms are vulnerable to workers stealing trade secrets, or just shirking on the job." He further argues that the economics of religion can provide explanations for the way in which "radical religious communities organize mechanisms to control defection in order to successfully conduct mutual aid—which they tend to be quite effective at."

Using Laurence Iannaccone's theory of strict religious clubs (see club good theory), Berman argues that successful radical religious groups, such as Hamas, Hezbollah, Lashkar-e-Taiba, Mahdi Army and the Taliban, excel at providing social services to their members, while simultaneously filtering out "free riders"; Berman calls these movements "some of the most accomplished rebels of modern times." He further argues that the success of groups such as Hamas and al-Qaeda is more due to their organizational structures than their theology. By way of counter example he examines the case of the militant Jewish organisation Gush Emunim Underground, which ultimately over-reached its ability to sustain a group without defections, by carrying out attacks on civilians while neglecting to induce the necessary loyalty in its members and political base through various welfare measures. (Previous low-level violent vigilante activity, argues Berman, had been treated as a public good by Gush Emunim settlers.)

Many commentators assume that people willing to join extremist groups are irrational, motivated only by extreme hate or abstract ideas of rewards in the afterlife. Contrary to these notions, Berman says that radical religious groups are rational in their selection of tactics. Berman does not see a dichotomy between insurgents and terrorists. He argues that they all belong to a single category he calls "rebels", and who, according to Berman, use a variety of techniques, depending on the circumstances, with suicide bombing being merely one end of the spectrum.

Berman does not ascribe suicidal terrorist acts to fanaticism or desperation, but instead he argues that these tactics are used "when the terrorist group begins to encounter hard targets, like American military bases, that are impervious to everything else." To support this thesis, Berman gives the Taliban as an example of a group that switched from traditional guerrilla-warfare techniques they used against the Northern Alliance to suicide bombings used against the Americans and other Westerners, as the only means, Berman argues, to make a significant impact against their new and more technologically advanced adversaries.

Berman argues that "Islamic fundamentalism" is a misnomer when applied to modern movements, and he prefers the term "Radical Islam", reasoning that many post-1920s movements starting with The Muslim Brotherhood, practice "unprecedented extremism", thus not qualifying as a return to historic fundamentals. He also approves of scholarship that argues that "the sanctification of political violence as Jihad by radical Islam is a recent phenomenon, a break with mainstream Muslim theology".

Berman attributes the birth of the Taliban movement to a phenomenon that long preceded the birth of modern radical Islam. He writes that the Taliban are a direct descendant of the nineteenth-century Deobandi movement in India, which opposed the British colonial rule and, among other things, established a system of religious schools.

In his 2009 book, Berman writes that "four radical religious organizations, Hezbollah, Hamas, the Taliban, and the Mahdi Army, continue to surprise established militaries with both their resilience and their lethality." He credits the Hezbollah for being those "who invented the modern high-casualty suicide attack in Lebanon in 1982". Berman's book seeks to address the question: "Why are religious radicals, who often start out appearing benign and charitable and generally avoid conflict, so effective at violence when they choose to engage in it?" Previously, Berman drew other parallels between Hamas, Hezbollah and the Taliban:

All three formed from affiliates of venerable nonviolent radical Islamic organizations, Hamas from the [Muslim Brotherhood] and the Taliban from the Jamiat-e-Ulema-Islam (JUI) in Pakistan, and Hezbollah from the clerical culture of the Shia holy cities in Iraq and Iran. All three movements arose in environments with weak local public good provision by government and responded by providing local public goods. Each developed into extremely effective insurgent organizations which produced specific local public goods (security) using violence. All three received generous subsidies from abroad, whether for geopolitical reasons, out of ideology, or in return for services. Younger members undergo some costly personal sacrifice in the case of the Taliban and Hamas (we know less about initiation of Hezbollah fighters). All three groups changed their ideologies drastically: Hamas in choosing armed conflict, the Taliban in deciding to protect Bin Laden and Hezbollah in shifting from a rebellion against Israeli occupation to an ethnic militia/political party after Israel's withdrawal from South Lebanon in 2000. There are differences: Hamas view most Palestinians as potential members, as Hezbollah regard Lebanese Shia, while the Taliban treated most Afghans as a conquered people. Yet the common elements, and especially the common puzzles, seem to justify analysis in parallel.

Berman argued that such parallels were common to other radical religious groups.

=== On Ultra-orthodox religious groups ===
Berman has also done field work among ultra-orthodox religious groups in Israel. Studying full-time Yeshiva students, who Berman finds study until 40 years old on average, and whose families have 7.6 children per woman (in the mid-1990s), he concludes that "Subsidies induce dramatic reductions in labor supply and unparalleled increases in fertility." In a 2000 NBER paper, Berman describes Ultra-Orthodox Jews as "a fascinating and fast-growing sect which has held virtual veto power over [Israeli] public policy for more than two decades."

=== On the relationship between unemployment and insurgency ===
Berman's NBER paper Do Working Men Rebel?, co-authored with Joseph Felter and Jacob N. Shapiro, drew the counterintuitive conclusion that reducing unemployment does not reduce insurgency-related violence. In an interview, Berman explains the findings as "insurgencies are very small organizations which need very few fighters to keep them going, and are often not constrained by a lack of recruits—and even if they were there's nothing to stop young men from working by day and planting roadside bombs by night."

== Personal life ==
Berman was born in Ottawa, Ontario, Canada. He describes his parents as "middle-of-the-road North American Jews." In 1981, Berman became an Israeli citizen, saying that he had "thought the Jewish experience would be more interesting in Israel". He then participated in the 1982 Lebanon War. Berman is now a US citizen. He is married and has two children.

== Education and academic career ==
After leaving the Israel Defense Forces in 1985, Berman studied at the Hebrew University of Jerusalem. He graduated with bachelor's degree in computer science and economics in 1987, and in 1989 obtained a master's in economics from the same university. He then obtained a PhD from Harvard University in 1993; his adviser was Zvi Griliches. After graduation from Harvard, Berman became an assistant professor at Boston University. He moved to UCSD in 2003.

== Selected publications ==
- Berman, Eli; Felter, Joseph H.; Shapiro, Jacob N. (2018-05-13). Small Wars, Big Data. Princeton University Press. ISBN 978-0-691-17707-6.
- Radical, Religious and Violent: The New Economics of Terrorism (MIT Press 2009), ISBN 978-0262026406
- Berman, Eli; Laitin, David P. (2008). "Religion, terrorism and public goods: Testing the club model" (PDF). Journal of Public Economics. 92 (9–10): 1942–1967. doi:10.1016/j.jpubeco.2008.03.007. S2CID 1698386. Archived from the original (PDF) on 2010-06-09.
- "Religious Extremism: the good, the bad and the deadly," (with Laurence R. Iannaccone), Public Choice, 128(1–2), 109–129, (2006).
- "Is Skill-Biased Technological Change Here Yet: Evidence from Indian Manufacturing in the 1990s," Annales d'Economie et de Statistique 79/80, 2006.
- "Language-Skill Complementarity: Estimated Returns to Immigrant Language Acquisition," (with Kevin Lang and Erez Siniver), Labour Economics, 10 (3), (June 2003) 265–290.
- "Environmental Regulation and Productivity: Evidence from Oil Refineries," (with Linda Bui), Review of Economics and Statistics, August 2001.
- "Environmental Regulation and Labor Demand: Evidence from the South Coast Air Basin," (with Linda Bui), Journal of Public Economics, February 2001.

== See also ==
- Economics of religion
- Rational choice theory
- Religious terrorism
- Radicalization
