= Roger Finke =

American sociologist

Roger Finke is a professor of Sociology and Religious Studies at The Pennsylvania State University and Director of the Association of Religion Data Archives. He is a former president of the Association for the Sociology of Religion.

== Career ==
Roger Finke earned his doctorate in sociology at the University of Washington in 1984, and held faculty positions at Concordia College in Illinois, Loyola University of Chicago, and Purdue University before joining the faculty at The Pennsylvania State University in 2000.

== Publications ==
Professor Finke co-authored two books with sociologist of religion Rodney Stark. The Churching of America, 1776-1990: Winners and Losers in Our Religious Economy received the 1993 Distinguished Book Award from the Society for the Scientific Study of Religion. Acts of Faith: Explaining the Human Side of Religion received the 2001 Book Award from the American Sociological Association's Sociology of Religion Section. These books extended what is often called the New Paradigm or the Rational Choice theoretical perspective, conceptualizing denominations as competitors in a religious market. The Churching of America was methodologically noteworthy for demonstrating the utility of quantitative historical data on church membership. Additionally, Finke is the co-author of The Price of Freedom Denied: Religious Persecution and Conflict in the Twenty-first Century and Places of Faith: A Road Trip Across America's Religious Landscape.

He is author or co-author of numerous peer-reviewed articles appearing in edited volumes and journals such as American Sociological Review, Journal for the Scientific Study of Religion, Review of Religious Research, Social Science Research, and The Sociological Quarterly. In November 2015, Finke and fellow Pennsylvania State University professor Dane Mataic published a report entitled "Exploring the Trends and Consequences of Religious Registration: A Global Overview." In this report, Finke and Mataic outlined a "significant increase" (from 13% to 18%) in countries that required religious registration around the world.

== Organizations ==
Professor Finke was the founding director of the American Religion Data Archive, which was renamed as the Association of Religion Data Archives (ARDA) in 2006. Supported by the Lilly Endowment and the John Templeton Foundation, the ARDA provides free data on American and international religion, along with tools and resources to assist educators, journalists, religious congregations, and researchers. Finke is also a Fellow of the Baylor Institute for Studies of Religion, and a past President of the Association for the Study of Religion, Economics, and Culture.
