= The Rise of Christianity =

1996 book by Rodney Stark

- Author: Rodney Stark
- Language: English
- Genre: Non-fiction
- Publisher: Princeton University Press; Harper San Francisco
- Publication date: 13 May 1996; 9 May 1997
- Publication place: United States
- Media type: print hard-cover (and 1997 paperback)
- Pages: 256; 272
- ISBN: 978-0691027494

The Rise of Christianity (subtitled either A Sociologist Reconsiders History or How the Obscure, Marginal Jesus Movement Became the Dominant Religious Force in the Western World in a Few Centuries, depending on the edition), is a book by the sociologist Rodney Stark, which examines the rise of Christianity, from a small movement in Galilee and Judea at the time of Jesus to the majority religion of the Roman Empire a few centuries later.

== Summary ==
Stark argues that contrary to popular belief, Christianity was not a movement of the lower classes and the oppressed but instead of the upper and middle classes in the cities and of Hellenized Jews. Stark also discusses the exponential nature of the growth of religion.

Stark points to a number of advantages that Christianity had over paganism to explain its growth:

- While others fled cities, Christians stayed in urban areas during plague, ministering and caring for the sick.
- Christian populations grew faster because of the prohibition of birth control, abortion, and infanticide. Since infanticide tended to affect female newborns, early Christians had a more even sex ratio and therefore a higher percentage of childbearing women than pagans.
- To the same effect: Women were valued higher and allowed to participate in worship leading to a high rate of female converts.
- In a time of two epidemics (165 CE and 251 CE), which killed up to a third of the Roman Empire each time, the Christian message of redemption through sacrifice offered a more satisfactory explanation of why bad things happen to innocent people. Further, the tighter social cohesion and mutual help made them able to better cope with the disasters, leaving them with fewer casualties than the general population. This would also be attractive to outsiders, who would want to convert. Lastly, the epidemics left many non-Christians with a reduced number of interpersonal bonds, making the forming of new ones both necessary and easier.
- Christians did not fight against their persecutors by open violence or guerrilla warfare but willingly went to their martyrdom and prayed for their captors, which added credibility to their evangelism.

Stark's basic thesis is that ultimately, Christianity triumphed over paganism because it improved the quality of life of its adherents at that time.

== Reception ==
"Stark has produced a provocative, insightful, challenging account of the rise of Christianity. The thesis—that Christianity was a success because it provided those who joined it with a more appealing, more assuring, happier, and perhaps longer life—may anger many readers and force all readers to stop and think. It is a marvelous exercise in the sociological imagination and a warning to those who like simple explanations--such as that Constantine was ultimately responsible for the success of Christianity when he made it the official religion of the Roman Empire" (Andrew M. Greeley, National Opinion Research Center, University of Chicago).

"For years, biblical scholars and church historians have used sociological jargon to promote ideological views. Now an established sociologist has entered the fray with devastating results. This brilliant and highly provocative book will revolutionize the way people think about both biblical studies and church history. Love it or hate it, Rodney Stark's The Rise of Christianity is a book nobody interested in the study of religion can ignore" (Irving Hexham, University of Calgary).

== In the media ==
The book prominently featured within the storyline of Hidden Empire by Orson Scott Card, according to the book's afterword, and The Rise of Christianity even inspired the book's plot.

== See also ==
- Sociology of religion
- Early Christianity
