= Itzchak Weismann =

Israeli historian and academic (born 1961)

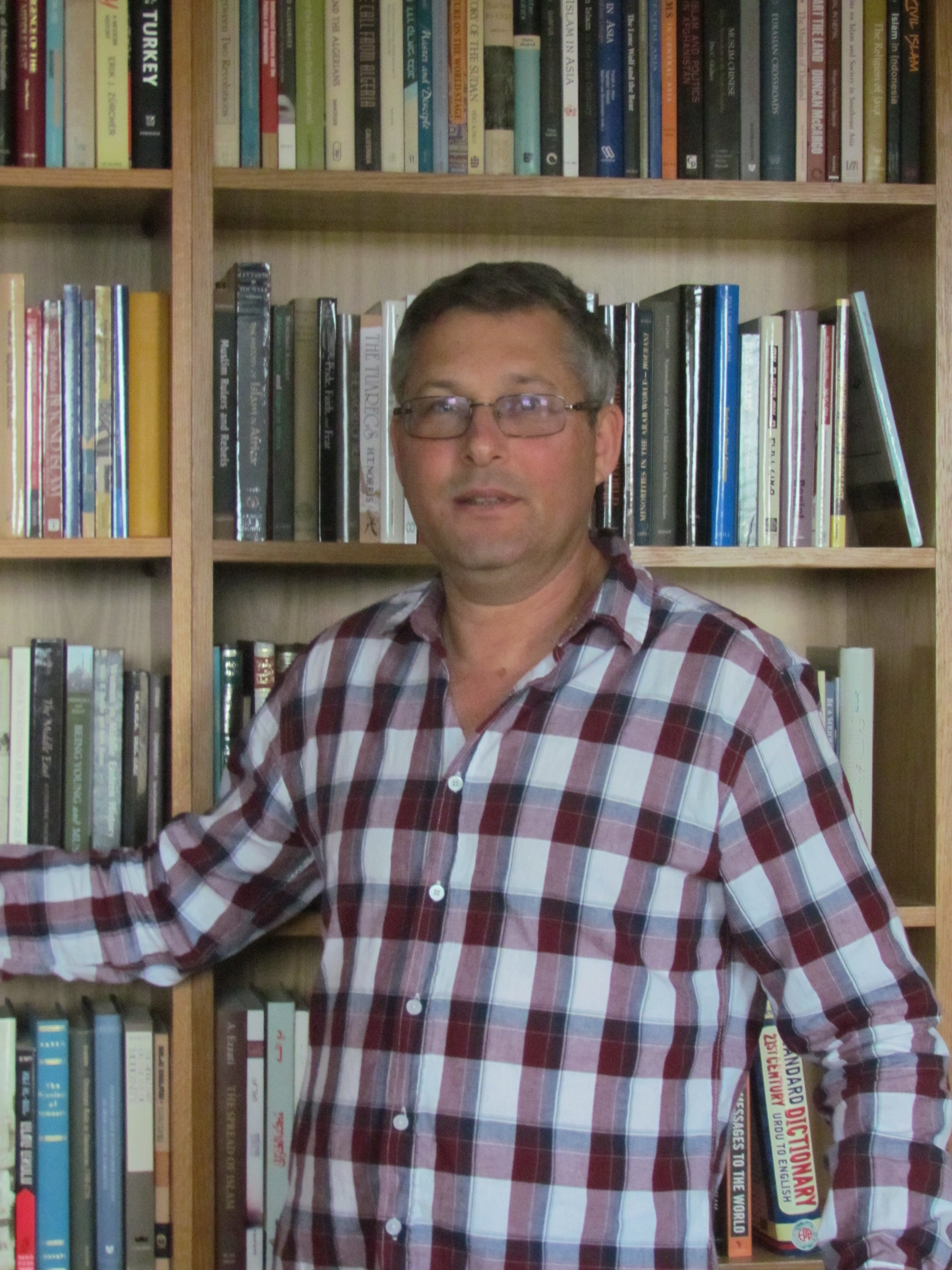
Itzchak Weismann

Itzchak Weismann (Hebrew: יצחק ויסמן; born on 14 September 1961) is an Israeli historian and full professor in the Department of the History of the Middle East at Haifa University. He was director of the Jewish-Arab Center in 2010-2013 and a member of the university Senate in 2012–2014. Weismann's work focuses on modern Islam and his research interests include the Salafis, the Muslim Brothers and the Sufis in the Middle East and South Asia, religious preaching and interfaith dialogue. He is scientific editor of the Crescent Series of Islamic Thought of Resling Press and a board member of the Journal of Sufi Studies. His photo exhibition Travels in the World of Islam has been displayed in various places since 2014.

== Biography ==
Itzchak Weismann was born and raised in Haifa. He completed his three academic degrees with distinction at the University of Haifa. He obtained his B.A. degree in the university program for distinguished students and the History of the Middle East Department. His M.A. thesis, under the direction of Professor Butrus Abu-Manneh, was dedicated to the life and teachings of Said Hawwa, the principal ideologue of the Syrian Muslim Brothers under the rule of Hafez al-Assad. His Ph.D. dissertation, under the guidance of Butrus Abu-Manneh and Nehemia Levtzion, dealt with the new religious reformist trends that emerged in late Ottoman Damascus in response to the modernization processes initiated by the central government and to the encounter with modern Western thought. Upon completion of his studies in 1998 he continued to post-doctoral research at Princeton University and Oxford University.

Weismann has taught at Haifa University since 1989, where he was promoted to Associate Professorship in 2010. He was guest lecturer at Dickinson College Pennsylvania in 2008–2009. As head of the Jewish-Arab Center he worked for the promotion of mutual understanding and connections between the communities through many conferences that brought together Israeli government ministers and Members of Knesset, academics, men of religion and leaders of social organizations. Among his projects were "Classmates," which brought together Jewish and Arabs students on campus, and "Acre as a Shared Space," which aimed at creating a model of living together in a shared city in respect of local government, education and welfare. Following that he was invited to take part in international interfaith and intercultural events in Vienna and in Kosovo. Weismann has published eight books (research, editing and translation), dozens of articles in professional journals in English and Hebrew, and more than ten encyclopedic entries. His writings have been translated into German, French, Italian, Turkish and Indonesian.

Itzchak Weismann is married to Gerda and father of Tomer, Maya and Shay.

== Research interests ==
Itzchak Weismann's research is devoted to the ideology and action of modern Islamic movements, particularly those of the Muslim Brothers and the Salafis. It examines how these movements emerged from the pre-modern Islamic tradition, which had been dominated by the Sufi brotherhoods, and the ideological and organizational innovations they introduced in the wake of the encounter with the West and in light of modernization processes in the Muslim world. First the focus was on Syria, but it gradually expanded to cover other countries in the Middle East, South Asia, Asia at large, and most recently the global arena.

=== The Emergence of Modern Islam and the Sufi Tradition ===
Itzchak Weismann goes counter to the common view that accepts at face value the hostile attitude of contemporary Islamic organizations to Sufism. According to such organizations, especially the Salafi and radical ones, Sufi brotherhoods were the main reason for the Muslims' deviation from the original Islam of the Qur'an and the Prophet's time, and the principal cause of the decline of Islam and its inferiority to Europe. In a detailed study of Damascus Weismann shows that the first generation of Islamic reformists were actually the sons of reformist Sufi men of religion who were open to European innovations and grandsons of Sufi men of religion who were the first to support the modernization of the Ottoman Empire. In a series of articles Weismann demonstrates that the same genealogy characterized the modern reformist trends in other cities: Baghdad, Aleppo and Hama, as well as religio-political movements such as the Muslim Brothers. A concluding article on the subject, entitled "Modernity from Within," argues that the move of Islam's center of gravity from the Sufi brotherhoods to the "fundamentalist" movements reflects its response to modernization, but also explains the increasing resort to violence in the name of religion.

=== The Naqshbandi Sufi Brotherhood ===
The Naqshbandiyya is the most orthodox and activist among the Sufi brotherhoods and the leading brotherhood throughout Asia. A later offshoot of the brotherhood from the nineteenth century was the first to significantly back the modern reforms initiated by the Ottoman Sultan at the beginning of that century; toward its end, to this offshoot also belonged most religious reformers in Syria's and Iraq's cities, as well as some of the leading Syrian Muslim Brothers. Weismann's monograph on this brotherhood, its first and to date only comprehensive treatment, begins with the formation of the Naqshbandiyya in the fourteenth century in Central Asia (Bukhara and Tashkent), continues with its spread down the following centuries to India, China and the Ottoman Empire, and concludes with its transformation into new forms of thought and organization in the modern era.

=== The Muslim Brothers ===
Most studies of the Muslim Brotherhood focus on the evolution of the movement in Egypt. Nonetheless, it is clear today that despite the common ideational matrix, it developed in different ways in the various countries of the Middle East and beyond. Weismann has dealt particularly with the life and thought of Said Hawwa, the principal ideologue of the movement in Syria under Hafiz al-Assad, as well in some selected questions concerning the movement in its entirety, such as its attitude to democracy, its perceptions of Muslim and Western civilization, and most recently its conception and implementation of da'wa: the preaching of Islam. The first study shows that the Syrian Muslim Brothers, who actively participated in the election campaigns of the 1950s and served as Members of Parliament and ministers until the Ba'ath takeover in 1963, favored democratic government, subject to the tenets of Islam. The second study points to the different perceptions of civilization that developed among the Brothers in the colonial and independent periods. The last study argues that it is da'wa rather than jihad that constitutes the original and preferred way of action of the Muslim Brothers, and that only under the duress of the post-colonial autocratic regimes did certain elements turn to jihad.

=== The South Asian Connection ===
In this sphere too Itzchak Weismann sails against the current. He argues that many modern Islamic ideas attributed to Middle Eastern thinkers and movements actually come from South Asia. Weismann explains that the crisis experienced by the Indian Muslims due to the decline of the Mughal Empire in the eighteenth century and the subsequent British occupation of the country erupted a full century before a similar crisis shook the Ottoman Empire. Consequently, the Indian Muslim men of religion were the first to conceive of the need for reform based on a return to original Islam, selective appropriation of Western innovations and a struggle to regain Islam's supremacy. Weismann demonstrates in his research the continuing contribution of South Asia to modern Islam, from the Naqshbandi brotherhood through the Salafi and Muslim Brothers movements to the radical organizations. Weismann dedicated a particular study to Nadwat al-Ulama, the principal Muslim organization in India that cherished its Middle Eastern contacts, and to its director, the great scholar Abu al-Hasan Ali al-Nadwi, who reshaped the religio-national historiography of the Indian Muslims following the partition of 1947 and maintained a wide network of contacts with Islamic organizations throughout the world.

=== Salafism ===
In the past few years Weismann has devoted ever more time to the study of the evolution of the Salafi trend, to which belong the Jihadi organizations of al-Qaeda and the Islamic State in Iraq and Syria (ISIS). He tries to elucidate how the liberal-religious thought of the early enlightened Salafis of the late nineteenth century, which sought to balance selective appropriation of Western ideas and values with a return to the original Islam of the 'forefathers' (the Salaf), degenerated into the brutal violence we witness today. Within this framework he published a biography of Abd al-Rahman al-Kawakibi, among the most eloquent spokesmen of early Salafism, along with an editing a Hebrew translation of his main oeuvre, The Mother of Cities.
