= Laurence Iannaccone =

American economist

Laurence Robert Iannaccone (/ˌjɑːnəˈkoʊni/ YAH-nə-KOH-nee; born May 24, 1954) is a Professor of Economics at Chapman University, Argyros School of Business and Economics, Orange County, California. Before moving to Chapman in 2009 he was a Koch Professor of Economics at George Mason University. He has established "Religion, Economics, and Culture", an interdisciplinary "Association for the Study of Religion, Economics, and Culture" (ASREC), and a new "Consortium for the Economic Study of Religion" (CESR). He is currently working on two books on the economics of religion. He is considered one of the pioneers of the field, and one of its most staunch advocates.

Iannaccone's education includes an MS in mathematics and a 1984 PhD in economics from the University of Chicago.

== See also ==
- Eli Berman
