= Geisler =

Geisler is a surname. Notable people with the surname include:

- Alan Geisler (1931–2009), American food chemist, created a red onion sauce used on hot dogs in New York City
- Anna Geislerová (born 1982), Czech actress
- Baron Geisler (born 1982), Filipino actor, the son of a Filipina mother and a German American dad
- Bruno Geisler (1857–1945), German ornithologist
- Christian Geisler (1869–1951), Danish organist and composer
- Donald Geisler (born 1978), Filipino taekwondo athlete of German-American descent
- Ester Geislerová (born 1984), Czech actress and model
- Hans Ferdinand Geisler (1891–1966), Luftwaffe commander during World War II
- Ilse Geisler (born 1941), East German luger
- Ladi Geisler (1927–2011), Czech musician, famous in post-war Germany
- Norman Geisler (1932–2019), American Christian apologist, co-founder of Southern Evangelical Seminary outside Charlotte, North Carolina
- Peter Geisler, German clarinettist
- Robert Geisler (1925–1993), American politician
- Rudolf Geisler (1911–1944), highly decorated Oberstleutnant in the Wehrmacht during World War II
- Zuzana Geislerová (born 1952), Czech actress

== See also ==
- James R. Geisler Middle School, public school located in Walled Lake, Michigan
- Naturpark Puez-Geisler, nature reserve in the Dolomites in South Tyrol, Italy
- Geissler (disambiguation)
- Geiszler
