= Geiseler =

Geiseler is a surname. Notable people with the surname include:

- Christoph A. Geiseler (born 1981), American filmmaker and musician
- Eduard Ferdinand Geiseler (1781–1827), German botanist

== See also ==
- Geissler (disambiguation)
- Geiszler
