= Mima =

Mima may refer to:

== Places ==
In Japan

- Mima, Tokushima, city in western Tokushima prefecture
- Mima District, Tokushima in Tokushima Prefecture
- Mima, Ehime, town in the Kitauwa District, Ehime

In the United States

- Mima, Kentucky, unincorporated community
- Mima, Washington, unincorporated community

Elsewhere

- Mima (Tanzanian ward), ward in Tanzania

== Name ==
- Mima Ito, (伊藤 美誠) (born 2000), Japanese table tennis player
- Mima Jaušovec (born 1956), Slovenian tennis player
- Mima Shimoda (下田 美馬; born 1970), Japanese wrestler
- Mima Soust, pseudonym of Uruguayan teacher and poet Alcira Soust Scaffo (1924–1997)
- Mima Stilwell, English singer
- Hiroko Mima (美馬 寛子; born 1986), Japanese fashion model
- Manabu Mima (美馬 学; born 1986), Japanese professional baseball pitcher
- Ryoko Mima (美馬 怜子; born 1984), Japanese model
- Kunioki Mima (三間 圀興; 1945–2025), Japanese plasma physicist

== Other uses ==
- Mima, a deified, semi-mystical machine in Harry Martinson's poem Aniara
- Mima (film), a 1991 French film featuring Nino Manfredi
- mima, the Middlesbrough Institute of Modern Art
- Mima mounds, a geological or ecological formation
- Mima Kirigoe, a character in the 1997 anime film Perfect Blue

== See also ==
- MIMA (disambiguation)
- Mimas (disambiguation)
