= MIMA =

MIMA may refer to:

- Member of the Institute of Mathematics and its Applications
- MiMA (building), an apartment building whose name means Middle of Manhattan, New York City, United States
- Middlesbrough Institute of Modern Art, art gallery in Middlesbrough, England
- Modern Improvisational Music Association, a public charity in New Jersey, United States
- Multicultural and Indigenous Media Awards, former name of NSW Premier's Multicultural Communication Awards, Australia
- Millennium Iconoclast Museum of Art, museum in Brussels

== See also ==
- Mima (disambiguation)
