= Geissler =

Geissler or Geißler may refer to:

== Persons ==
- Ernst Geissler (1915–1989), German and American aerospace engineer
- Fritz Geißler (1921–1984), German composer
- Heike Geißler (born 1977), German writer
- Heiner Geißler (1930–2017), German politician (CDU)
- Heinrich Geißler (1814–1879), German physicist
- Ines Geißler (born 1963), German swimmer
- Jonas Geissler (born 1984) German politician
- Martin Geissler (born 1971), Scottish news reporter
- Phillip Geissler (1974–2022), American theoretical chemist
- Siegfried Geißler (1929–2014), German composer, conductor, hornist and politician
- Sina-Aline Geißler (born 1965), German writer and journalist
- William Geissler (1894–1963), Scottish painter

== Others ==
- Geissler (crater), lunar crater named for Heinrich Geißler
- Geißler (Lauer), river in Bavaria, Germany
- Geissler Mountain, mountain in Colorado, US

== See also ==
- Geisler
- Geiszler
