= Mimas (disambiguation) =

Mimas is a moon of Saturn marked by a giant crater on its surface.

Mimas may also refer to:

- Mimas (Giant), son of Gaia in Greek mythology, one of the Gigantes
- Mimas (Aeneid), a son of Amycus and Theono, born the same night as Paris, who escorted Aeneas to Italy
- Karaburun, a town and district in Turkey, formerly called Mimas in reference to the Giant
- Mimas (moth), a genus of hawk moths
- Mimas (data centre), a UK national academic data centre at the University of Manchester
- Mimas, a centaur mentioned in the archaic Greek epic poem, the Shield of Heracles, at line 182
- Mimas, grandfather of Aeolus, the keeper of the winds in Homer's Odyssey
- Mayamas, Ottoman name of a town in Syria

Pronounced with a final /z/ sound, it may be:

- Mima mounds, the unexplained geological formations found on the Mima Prairie, as well as other locations
