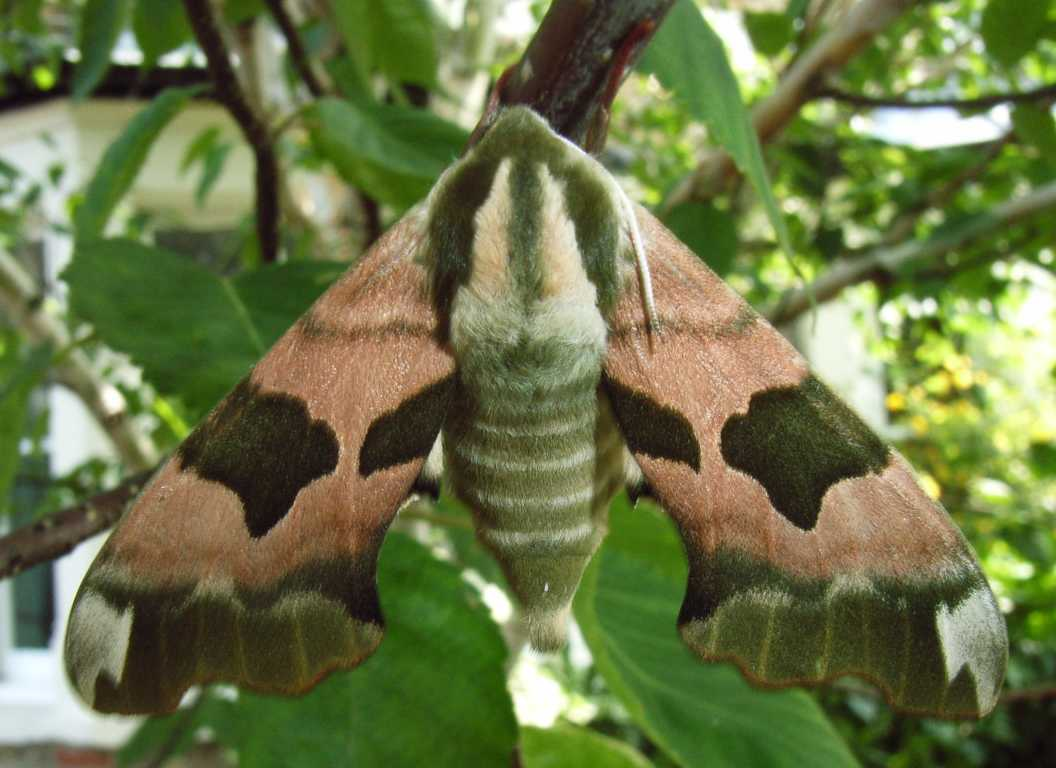

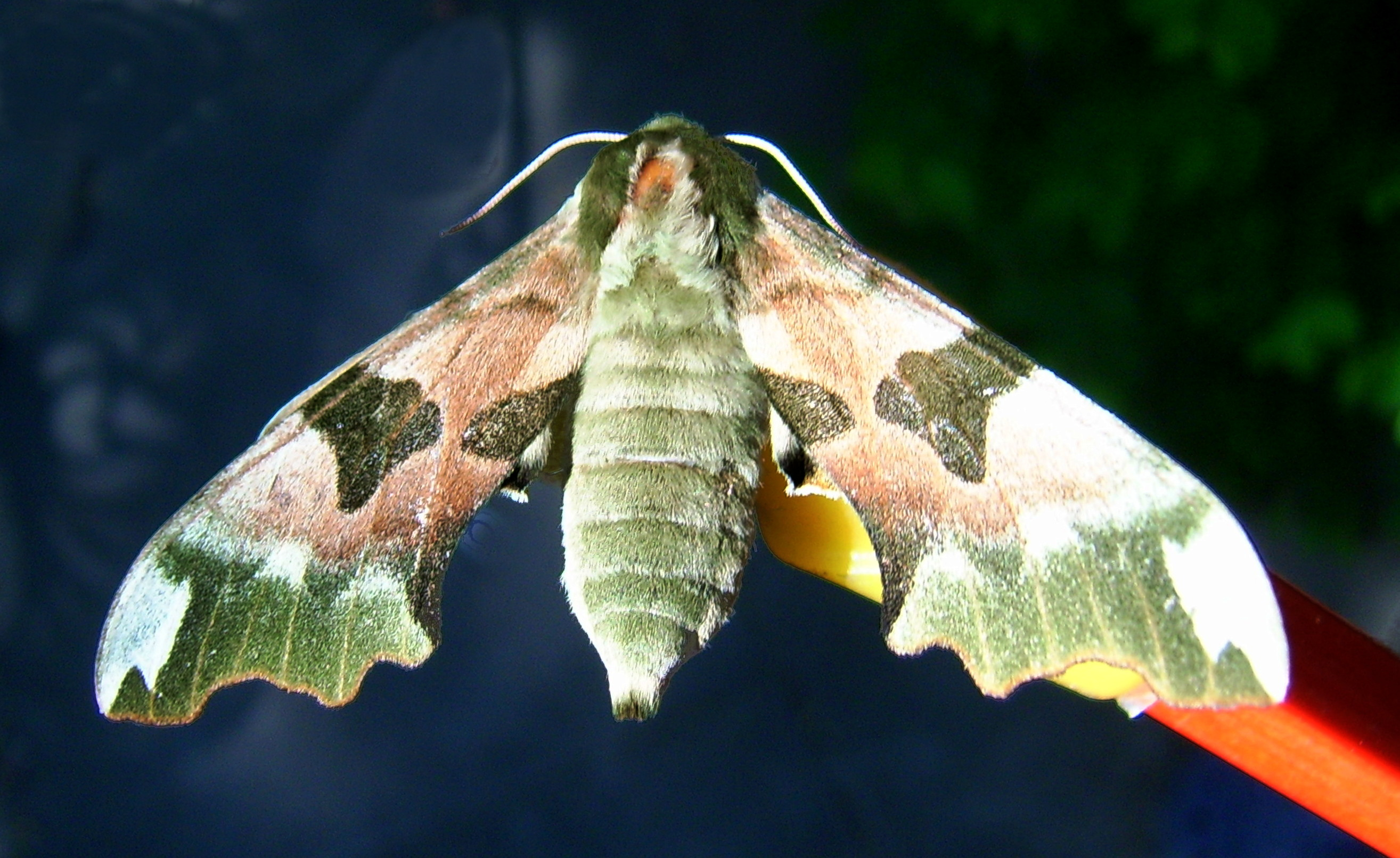

Scientific classification
- Kingdom: Animalia
- Phylum: Arthropoda
- Clade: Pancrustacea
- Class: Insecta
- Order: Lepidoptera
- Family: Sphingidae
- Genus: Mimas
- Species: M. tiliae

Binomial name
- Mimas tiliae (Linnaeus, 1758)

Synonyms
- Sphinx tiliae Linnaeus, 1758; Smerinthus ulmi Heydenreich, 1851; Dilina tiliae brunnescens Staudinger, 1901; Dilina tiliae exstincta Staudinger, 1901; Dilina tiliae roseotincta Schawerda, 1922; Merinthus tiliae tilioides (Holle, 1865); Mimas tiliae angustefasciata (Vilarrubia, 1973); Mimas tiliae atroviridis Closs, 1911; Mimas tiliae bicolor (Vilarrubia, 1973); Mimas tiliae bimaculata Gillmer, 1916; Mimas tiliae bimarginalis Gillmer, 1916; Mimas tiliae brunnea-centripuncta Tutt, 1902; Mimas tiliae brunnea-costipuncta Tutt, 1902; Mimas tiliae brunnea-marginepuncta Tutt, 1902; Mimas tiliae brunnea-obsoleta Tutt, 1902; Mimas tiliae brunnea-transversa Tutt, 1902; Mimas tiliae clara Closs, 1917; Mimas tiliae colon Gillmer, 1916; Mimas tiliae constricta Gillmer, 1916; Mimas tiliae diluta Cockayne, 1953; Mimas tiliae discifera Closs, 1917; Mimas tiliae excessiva Gillmer, 1916; Mimas tiliae fasciata Gillmer, 1916; Mimas tiliae griseothoracea Cabeau, 1931; Mimas tiliae inversa Gillmer, 1916; Mimas tiliae latefasciata (Vilarrubia, 1973); Mimas tiliae lutescens Tutt, 1902; Mimas tiliae marginalis Mecke, 1926; Mimas tiliae margine-puncta Tutt, 1902; Mimas tiliae montana Daniel & Wolfsberger, 1955; Mimas tiliae pallida-centripuncta Tutt, 1902; Mimas tiliae pallida-costipuncta Tutt, 1902; Mimas tiliae pallida-maculata Lempke, 1959; Mimas tiliae pallida-marginepuncta Tutt, 1902; Mimas tiliae pallida-obsoleta Tutt, 1902; Mimas tiliae pallida-transversa Tutt, 1902; Mimas tiliae pallida Jordan, 1911; Mimas tiliae postobscura (Lempke, 1959); Mimas tiliae pseudo-trimaculata Gillmer, 1916; Mimas tiliae pseudobipunctata (Lempke, 1959); Mimas tiliae reducta (Vilarrubia, 1973); Mimas tiliae rubra Cockayne, 1953; Mimas tiliae rufescens (Vilarrubia, 1973); Mimas tiliae rufobrunnea Lenz, 1925; Mimas tiliae semicentripuncta Gillmer, 1905; Mimas tiliae semiobsoleta Tutt, 1902; Mimas tiliae suffusa (Clark, 1891); Mimas tiliae transversa Jordan, 1911; Mimas tiliae typica-bipunctata (Lempke, 1959); Mimas tiliae virescens-bipunctata Lempke, 1937; Mimas tiliae virescens-centripuncta Tutt, 1902; Mimas tiliae virescens-maculata Tutt, 1902; Mimas tiliae virescens-marginepuncta Tutt, 1902; Mimas tiliae virescens-obsoleta Tutt, 1902; Mimas tiliae virescens-transversa Tutt, 1902; Mimas tiliae virescens Jordan, 1911; Mimas tiliae viridis (Closs, 1911); Mimas tiliae vitrina Gehlen, 1931; Smerinthus tiliae bipunctata (Clark, 1891); Smerinthus tiliae brunnea Bartel, 1900; Smerinthus tiliae brunnea Caradja, 1893; Smerinthus tiliae centripuncta (Clark, 1891); Smerinthus tiliae costipuncta (Clark, 1891); Smerinthus tiliae immaculata Bartel, 1900; Smerinthus tiliae maculata (Wallengren, 1863); Smerinthus tiliae obsoleta (Clark, 1891); Smerinthus tiliae pechmanni Hartmann, 1879; Smerinthus tiliae ulmi Bartel, 1900

= Mimas tiliae =

Species of moth

Mimas tiliae, the lime hawk-moth, is a moth of the family Sphingidae. It is found throughout the Palearctic region and the Near East, and in northern Spain (Europe). The species was first described by Carl Linnaeus in his 1758 10th edition of Systema Naturae.

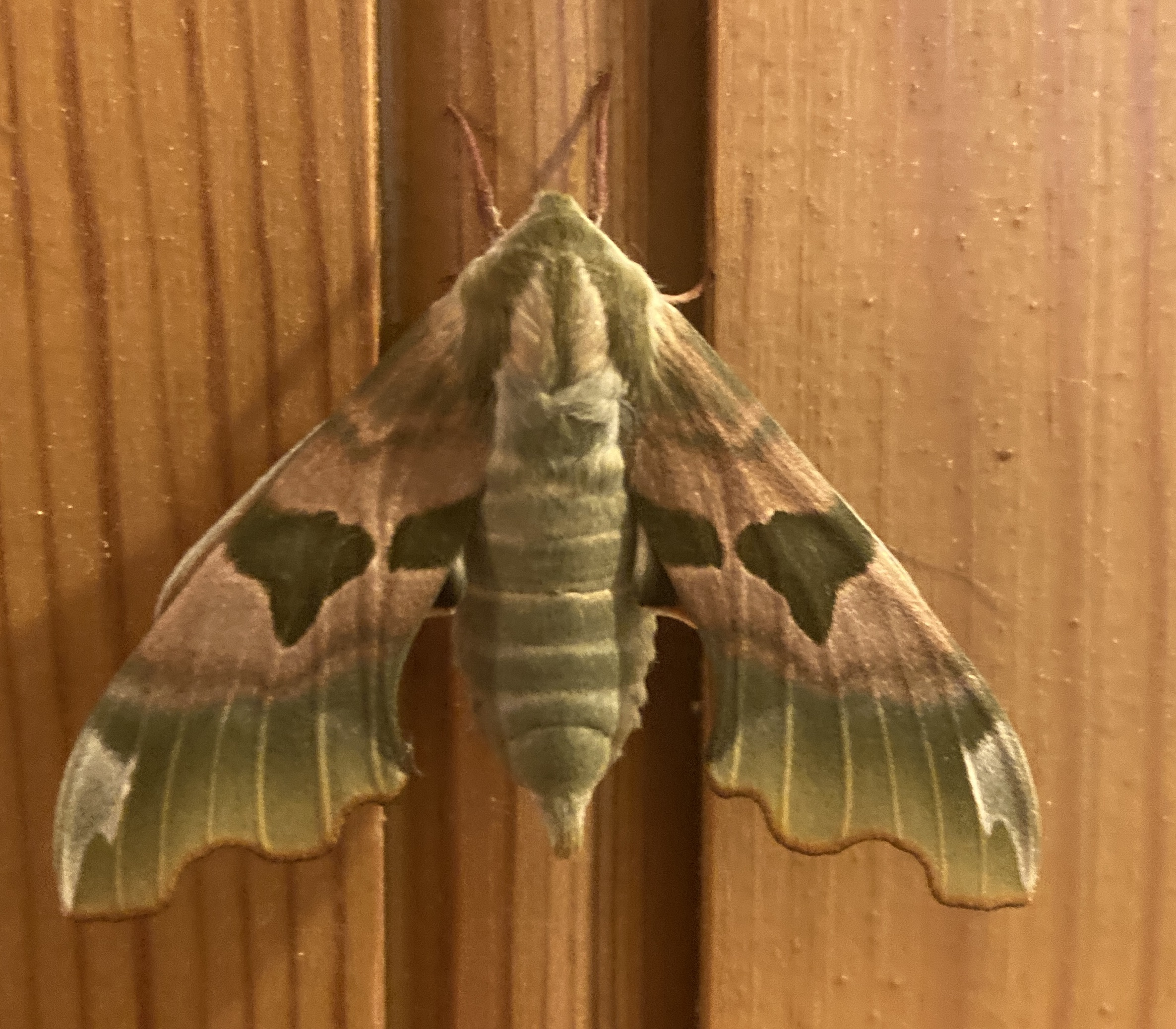

This species is quite variable, though not confusable with any other sphingid of the Palearctic in its markings, the ground colour of the forewings being pinkish or buff, darker towards the tornus, marked with one or two dark green or brown blotches which are sometimes merged to form a continuous band across the middle of the forewing. The hindwings are plainer, grey or buffish brown. The wingspan is 70–80 millimetres (2 3/4–3 1/8 in). It exhibits sexual dimorphism, the male usually being smaller but more strongly marked than the female. Usually, the forewing ground colour is brownish in females and decidedly green in males, but there are many exceptions. The female abdomen is straight and fat with fully formed eggs, which are already present when the female emerges (as in all species of Smerinthini). The male abdomen, on the other hand, is strongly curved and slender.

Forms include

- f. brunnea Bartel ground colour brown
- f. pallida Tutt ground colour grey
- f. lutescens Tutt yellow
- f. virescens Tutt ground colour green
- f. transversa Tutt dark median band of the forewing entire
- f. tiliae dark median band narrowly separated
- f. obsoleta Clark dark median band completely absent

This moth flies at night in May and June, (Note: The flight season refers to the British Isles. This may vary in other parts of the range.) and is attracted to light. The adults do not feed.

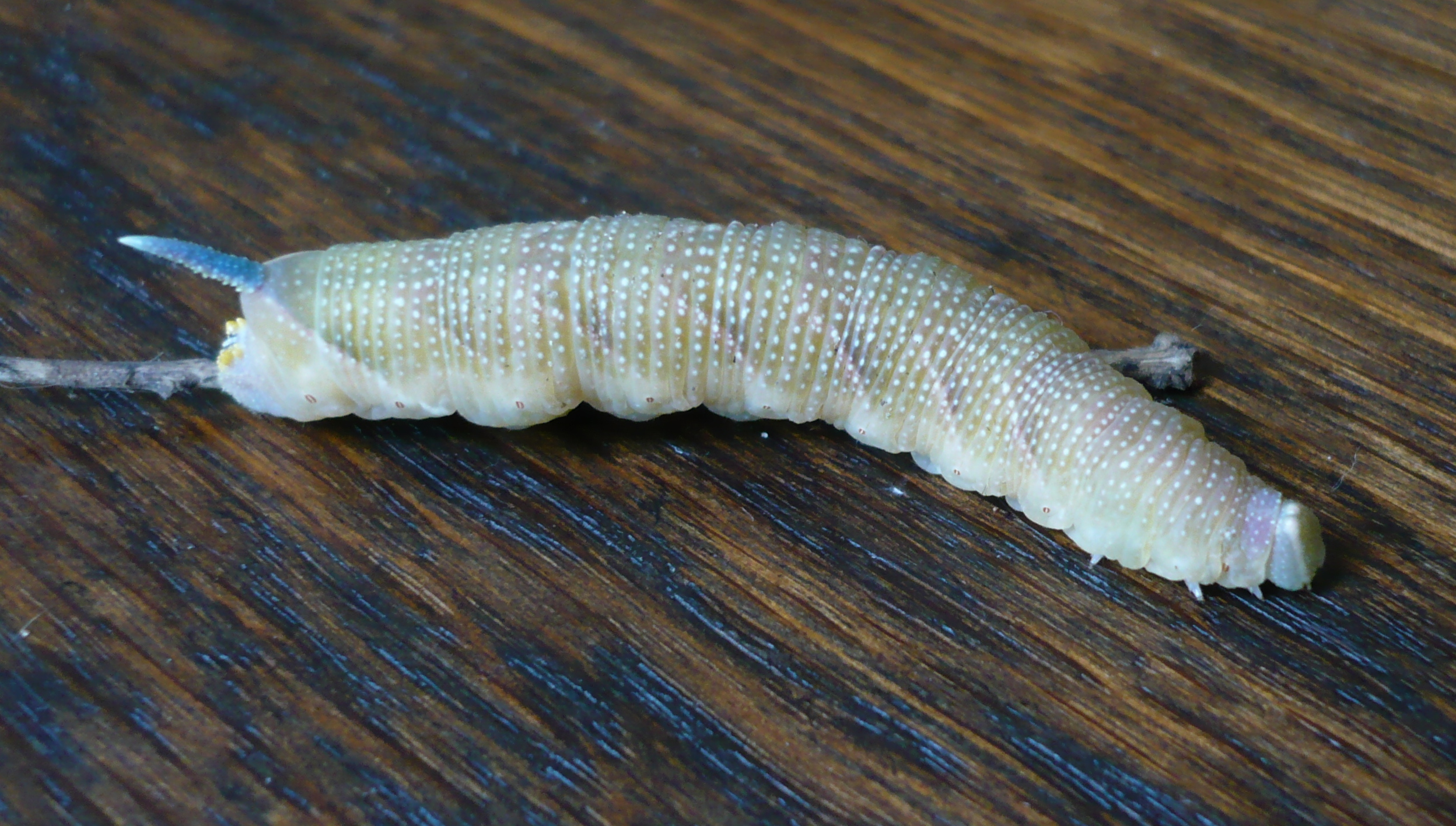
Caterpillar/Larva

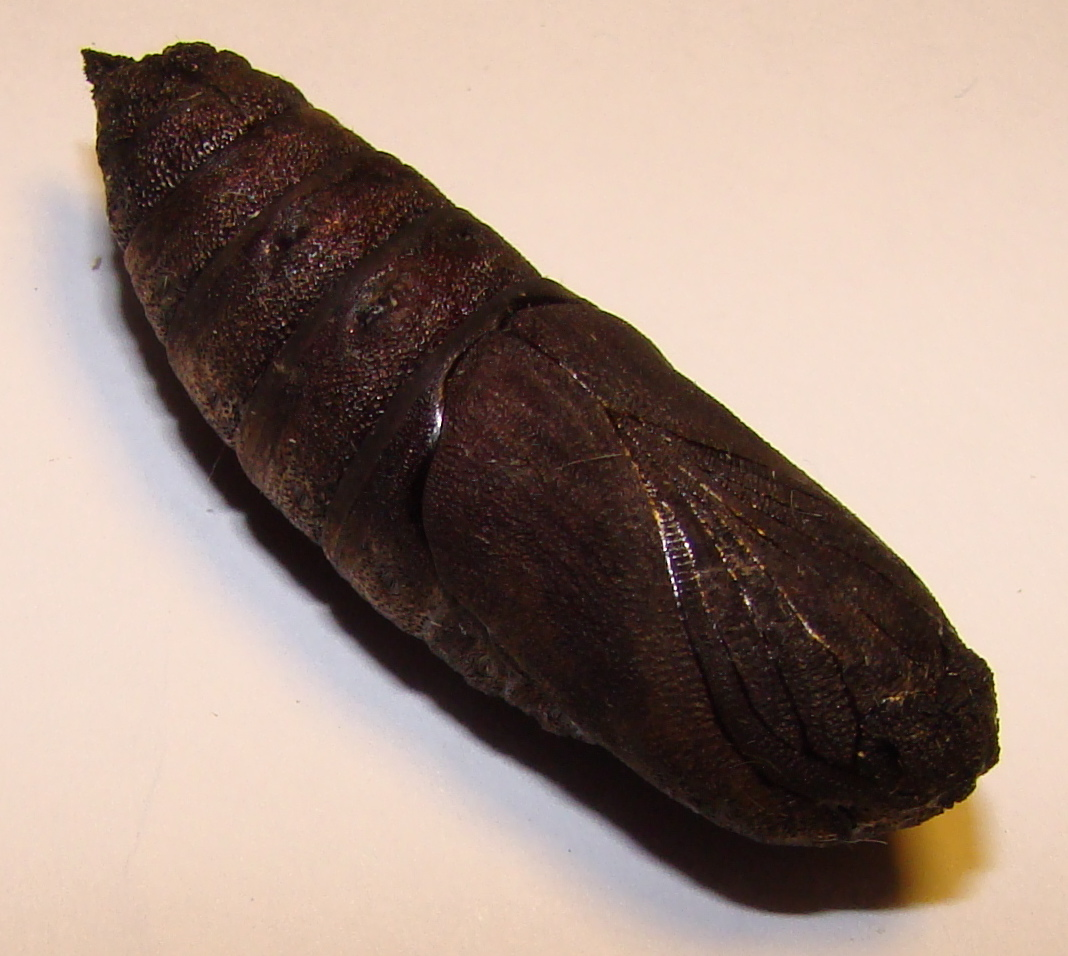
Chrysalis/Pupa
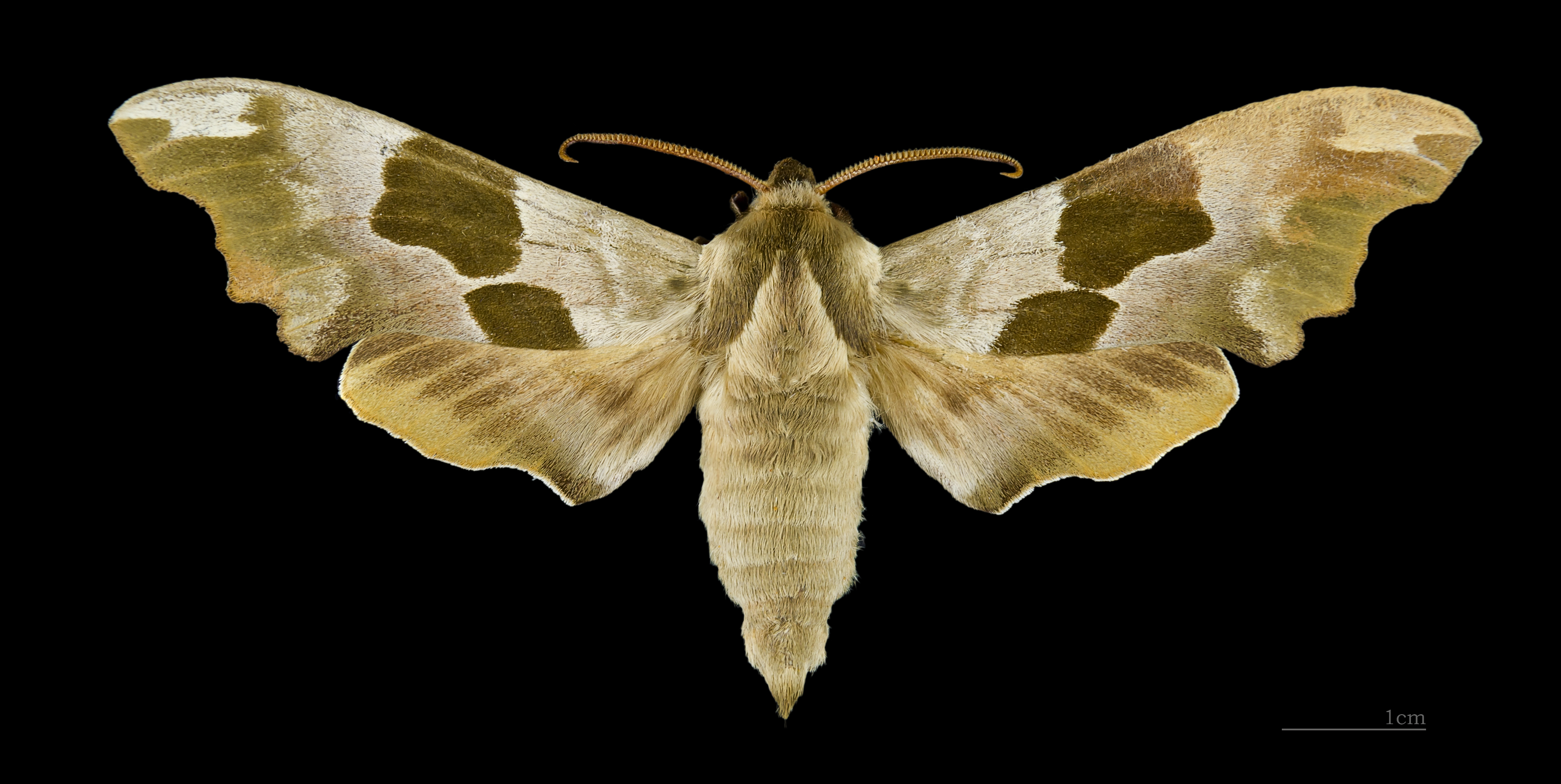
Mimas tiliae ♂ – MHNT

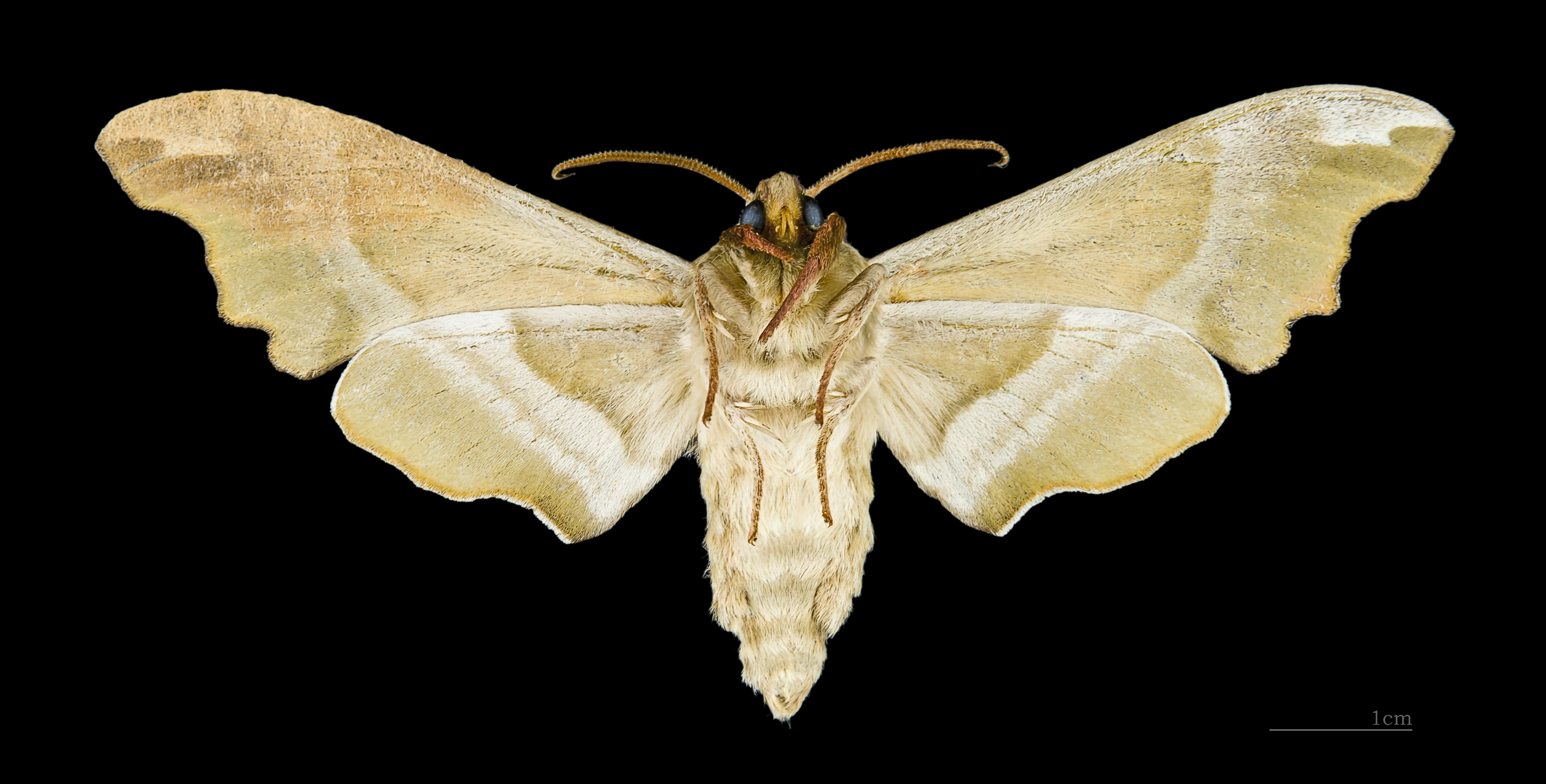
Mimas tiliae ♂ underside – MHNT

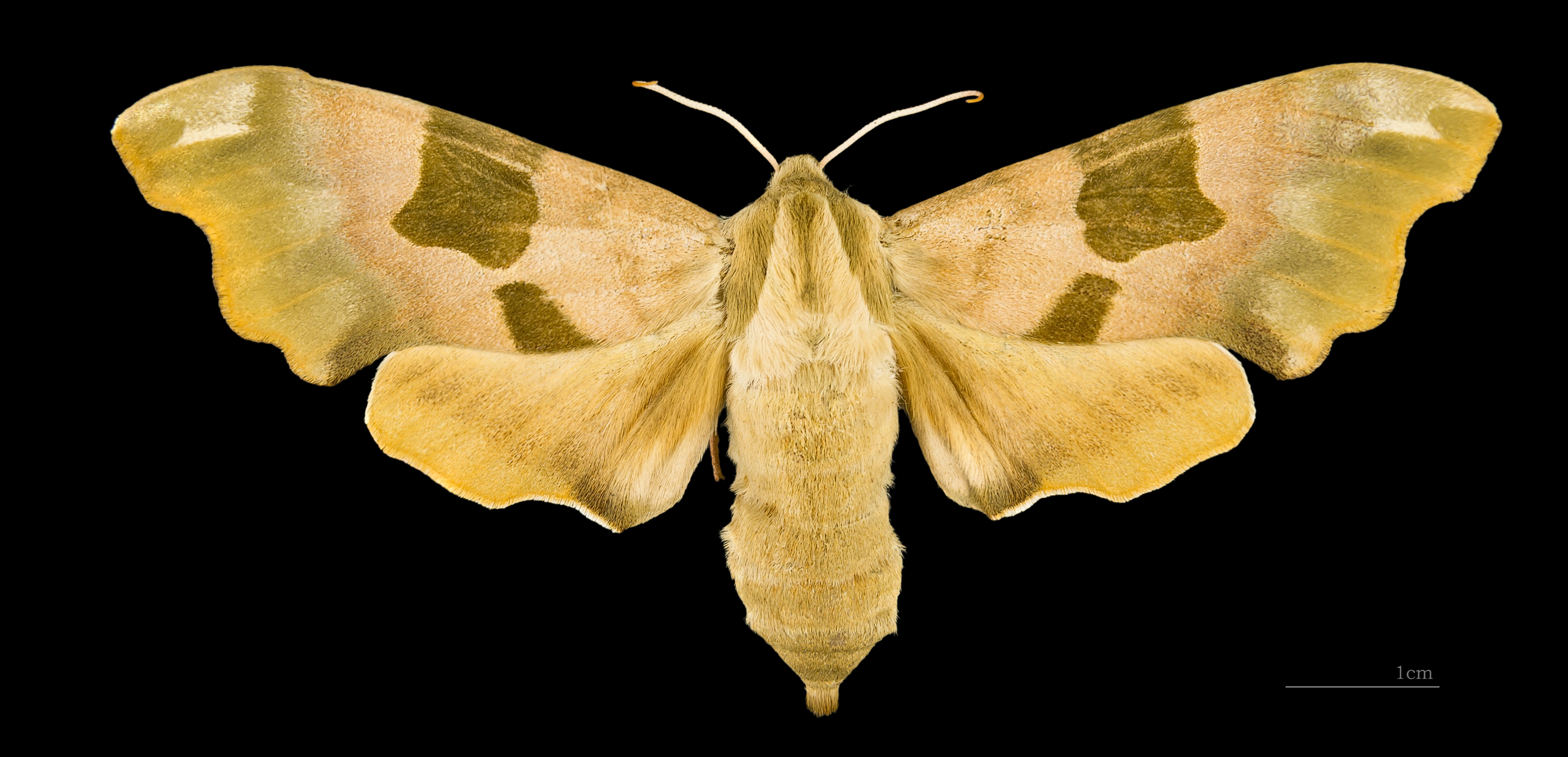
Mimas tiliae ♀ – MHNT

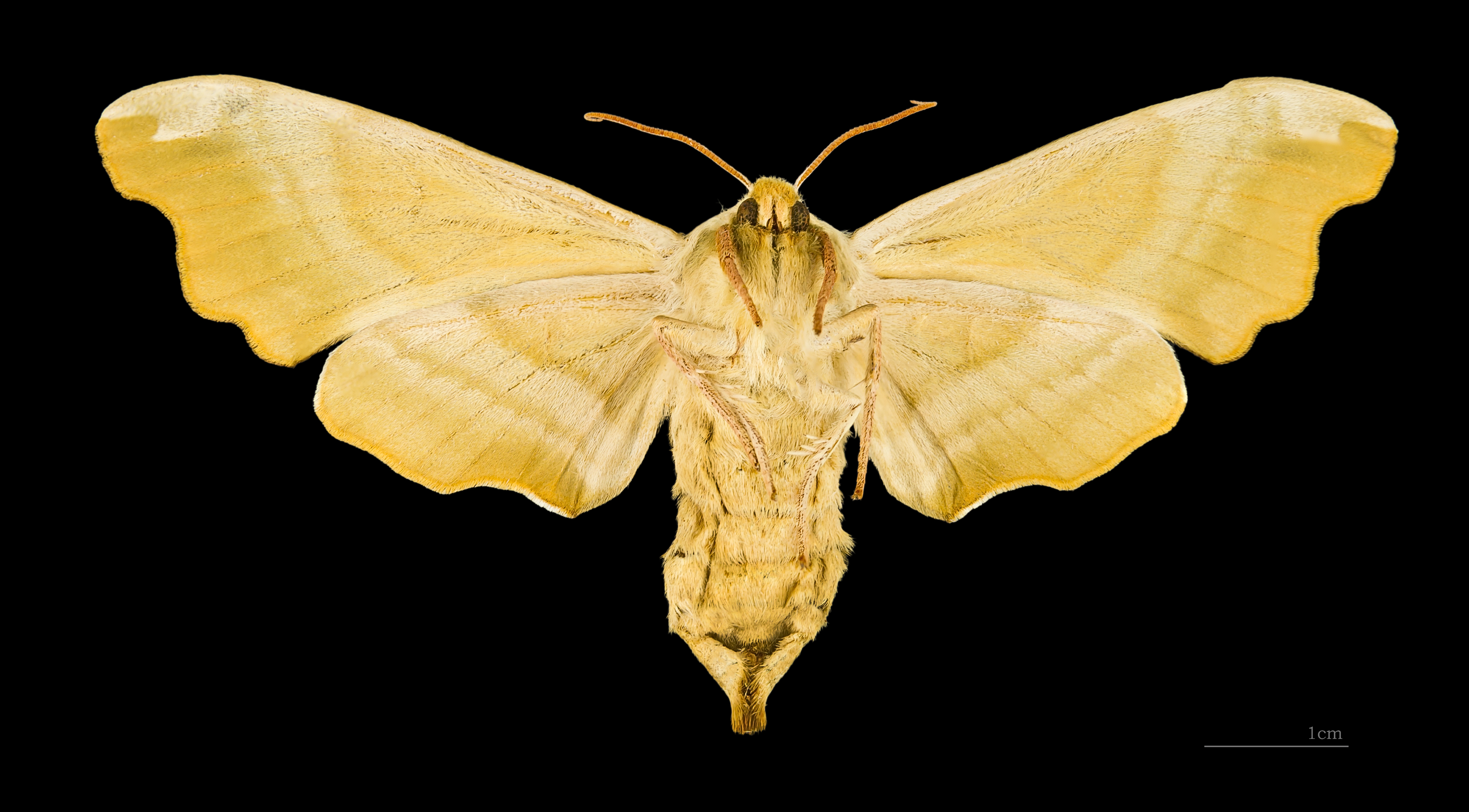
Mimas tiliae ♀ underside – MHNT

The larva is green with yellow and red markings along the side and a blue horn at the hind end, typical of the family. It feeds mainly on lime but has also been recorded feeding on other trees and shrubs (see list below). The colour changes to purple-grey when ready to pupate, at which point the larvae wander in search of a pupation site. The species overwinters as a pupa in the soil at the base of its host tree.

== Recorded food plants ==
- Alnus – alder
- Betula – birch
- Morus – mulberry
- Prunus
- Quercus – oak
- Tilia – lime
- Ulmus – elm
