= Robert Lebeck =

German photojournalist (1929–2014)

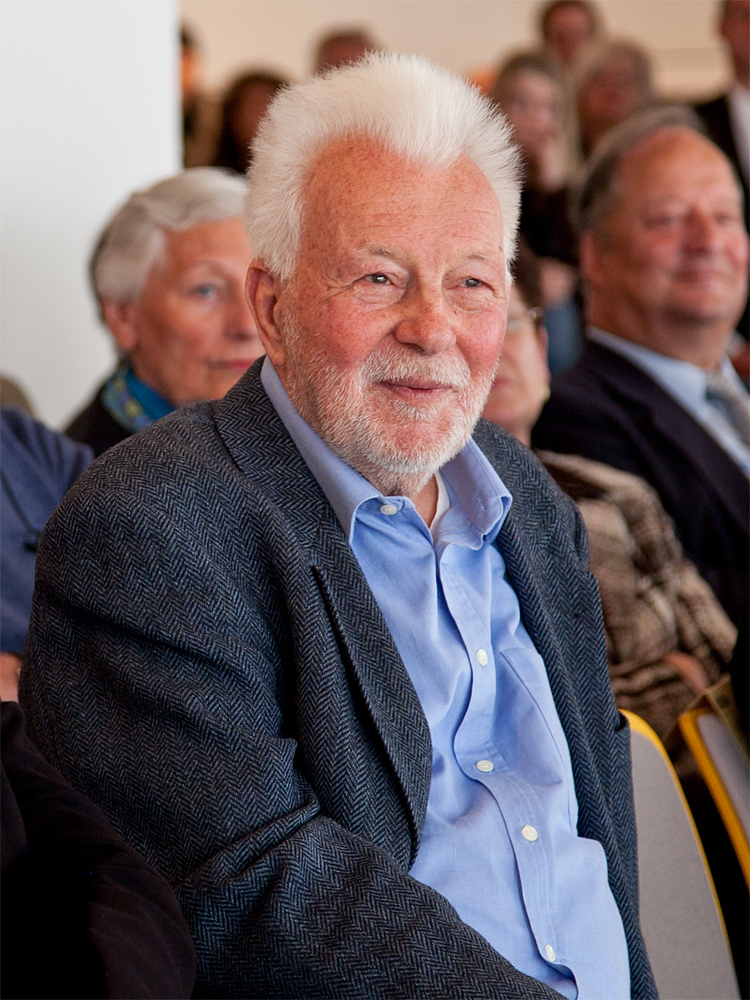
Robert Lebeck in 2011

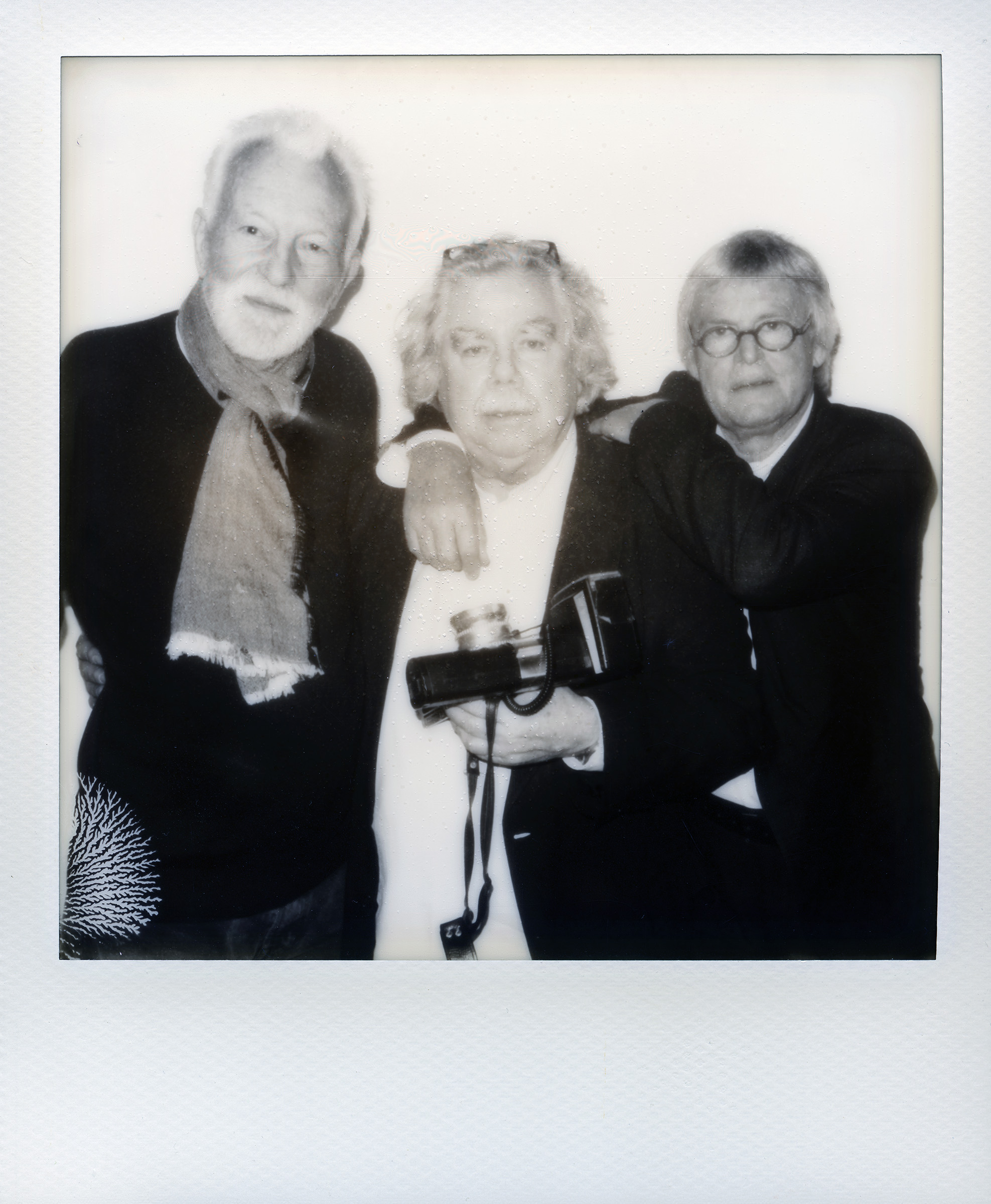
Robert Lebeck, Volker Hinz and Konrad R. Müller photographed by Oliver Mark, Berlin 2014

Robert Lebeck (21 March 1929 – 14 June 2014) was a German photojournalist.

== Biography ==
At the age of fifteen Lebeck was drafted into the Wehrmacht and sent to the Eastern Front where he was captured as a POW by the Soviet Army. Finally repatriated after World War II, he finished high school at the Donaueschingen Fürstenberg Gymnasium, and went on to study ethnology in Zurich and New York. Self-taught as a photographer, he started in 1952 as a freelancer selling to various newspapers and magazines in Heidelberg. Lebeck then went on to be employed by the magazines Illustrierte wie Revue and Kristall, and finally by the German weekly news magazine Stern. He worked for Stern for thirty years as a photojournalist, with a brief sabbatical during 1977 to 1978, as editor-in-chief of the monthly educational magazine Geo. Since 2001 Lebeck resided in Berlin.

Lebeck became well known in 1960 after his report on the independence of the Congo "Afrika im Jahre Null" ("Africa in Year Zero") which included a photograph of an African man, Ambroise Boimbo pinching the ceremonial sword of Belgian King Baudouin. To this day that picture remains his "calling card".

== Awards ==
- 2007 Henri Nannen Lifetime Achievement Award

== Exhibits ==
- "Tokio-Moskau-Leopoldville", Hamburg Arts and Crafts Museum (Museum für Kunst und Gewerbe), Hamburg 1961
- "Sammlung R.L. - Fotografie des 19. Jahrhunderts", Neue Nationalgalerie, Berlin 1982
- "Augenzeuge Robert Lebeck - 30 Jahre Zeitgeschichte", Stadtmuseum, Kiel 1983
- "Robert Lebeck - Fotoreportagen", Perpignan (south of France) 1991
- "Kiosk. Eine Geschichte der Fotoreportage", Museum Ludwig, Cologne 2001
- "Unverschämtes Glück", Willy Brandt House, Berlin 2004
- "Robert Lebeck - Neugierig auf Welt", Galerie & Edition Bode, Nuremberg 2008
- "Robert Lebeck. Fotografien 1955-2005", Martin-Gropius-Bau, Berlin 2008
