= Volker Hinz =

German photographer (1947–2019)

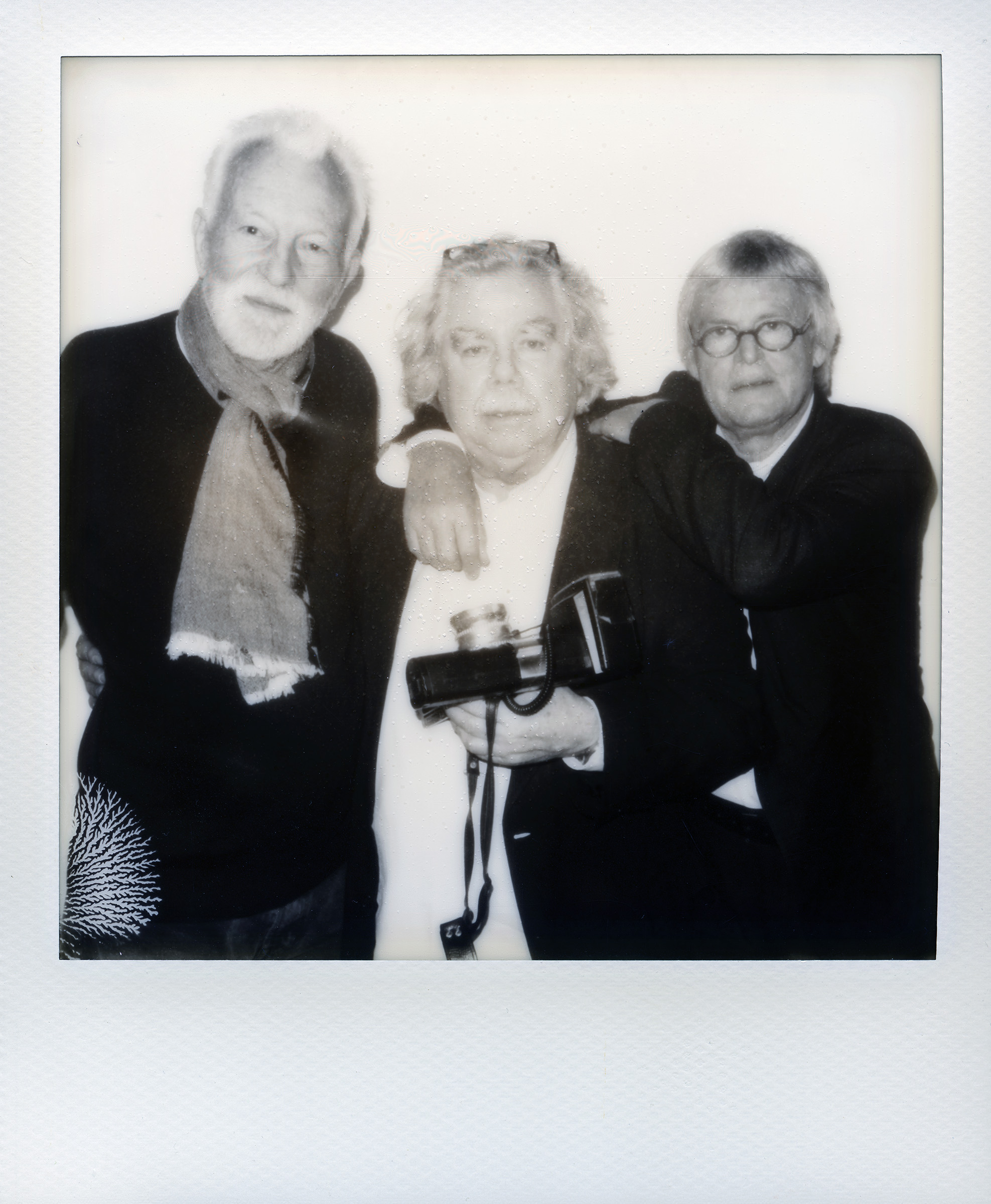
Robert Lebeck, Volker Hinz and Konrad R. Müller photographed by Oliver Mark, Berlin 2014

Volker Hinz (June 19, 1947 – October 2019) was a German photographer. Early in his career he became known for his political reportage and travel stories; now his portraits of artists, authors, fashion designers, sports men and politicians are better known.

== Life ==
Volker was born in Hamburg in 1947; his direction in life was determined early on by photography. Even as a 20-year-old, he sold his first photos to newspapers. At the age of 24 he became head of the photo agency "Sven Simon" in Bonn – at that time the capital of the Federal Republic of Germany. In 1974 he became a member of the crew of staff photographers of the weekly magazine Stern in Hamburg. In 1978 he moved as a freelance photographer to Los Angeles until he became a staffer again for Stern magazine in New York. There many of his great stories, portraits and reportages made him known worldwide. Since 1986, back in Hamburg again, he worked out of his home town.

== Oeuvre ==
At the beginning of his career in the 1970s, Volker Hinz formed his reputation with reports from the German political scene. Later, on behalf of the magazine, he took the opportunity for gripping stories and photographic documentations such as on New York nightlife, on Hollywood, on Mexican Oil, on Argentina and Palm Beach for which he received awards at World Press, Art Directors Club Germany and Lead Award.

== Reception ==
Stern Magazine: "For thirty years, Hinz worked for Stern – almost eight years away, based in New York. Over three decades he illustrated countless reports. Muhammad Ali, Woody Allen, Helmut Schmidt, to name just some of the many world famous personalities, which he accompanied with the photo camera. Legendary his photo of Pele and Franz Beckenbauer ... Hinz' photographs shaped the appearance of the magazine. The focus of his work was always the human as a motif and humanity as a visual language." (By David Scherf) Volker Hinz Exhibition 2008 Stern Magazine: "The photographer Volker Hinz is... a contemporary painter. The contemporary painter among the great photographers, to be exact. For decades, the photographer Volker Hinz portrays the star, the famous and the powerful of this world. Now he puts himself once in the center (by: Ulrike Posche) congratulates to his 60th Birthday."

Stern Magazine: "For nearly three decades, the photographer Volker Hinz works for Stern. His reports from around the world, his pictorial stories and especially his black and white portraits of international personalities establish his superior rank as a photographer and have strongly influenced the look of the magazine. Stern – photographer Volker Hinz presented in a photo exhibition for the first time a selection of his works, including portraits of famous personalities".

Artist Talk between Volker Hinz and Ulrich Rueter, Gruner + Jahr Publishing House: "For almost forty years, Volker Hinz has decisively influenced the visual appearance of Stern magazine. Hardly a book without his sovereign portraits of celebrities from around the world . Now the publisher Gruner + Jahr honors him with an exhibition and with the latest volume in the series Stern Fotografie portfolio." To make experiences from photographs is the art and the craft of Volker Hinz." What distinguishes him are 'kid gloves and eagle eyes'." (Jochen Siemens)

"Volker Hinz is one of the most prolific portrait photographers in the German press and his special ability is to add new aspects beyond the known add clichés, in particular to the portraits of famous – and sometimes infamous – contemporaries in the fields of politics, film, literature, sports and fashion. The bare soccer players Pele and Beckenbauer in the shower or Woody Allen, who forbids himself the mouth, Kate Moss with golden feet: there are not only pictures, but stories told by the camera of Volker Hinz"

== Solo exhibitions ==
- 2015: Volker Hinz – AREA REVISITED, 11. June until 28. June 2015, Oberhafen, Hamburg,
- 2014: Volker Hinz – Legends, 8. May until 20. June 2014, Łódź, Poland
- 2014: Volker Hinz – 14. May until July, HSBC & Trinkaus, Hamburg
- 2012: "Volker Hinz – Stolen Moments", 16. March until 16. June 2012, Galerie "No 6 – Raum für Fotografie", Bremen
- 2012: "Volker Hinz – stars im stern", 5. until 26. April 2012, Gruner + Jahr Pressehaus, Hamburg
- 2011: "Volker Hinz – Triennale der Photographie – Gesichter des Kinos.Internationale Filmstars", 10. April until 5. June 2011, Museum Langes Tannen, Uetersen
- 2008: "Volker Hinz – Party, Pumps und Kleiderbügel – Fotografien aus der Modewelt", 23. April until 19. June 2008, Landdrostei, Pinneberg.
- 2006: "Volker Hinz – Fotografien 1974 – 2004. Retrospektiv", 23. April until 30. July 2006, Landesmuseum, Oldenburg
- 2005: "Volker Hinz, – '24 hours 7 days, Fotografien 1974–2004. Retrospektiv", 20. April until 19. June 2005, Altonaer Museum, Hamburg
- 2004: "Volker Hinz – Böse Bilder mit dem Biogon", 7. March – 18. April 2004, Palais für aktuelle Kunst, Glückstadt
- 2002: "Volker Hinz – Selbstporträts" 20. August – 20. October 2002, Altonaer Museum, Hamburg
- 2002: "Volker Hinz – Private Life of Muhammad Ali", 14. May until 20. June 2002,
- 1997: "Volker Hinz – Prominenten Porträts", 1997 Altonaer Museum, Hamburg
- 1991–1992: "Volker Hinz – Trvelling exhibition "Area" in Germany
- 1991: "Volker Hinz – "Area", 1991, Fotogalerie Bezirksamt Friedrichshain, Berlin
- 1990: "Volker Hinz – "Area", 1990, Fotofroum, Frankfurt
- 1990: "Volker Hinz – "Area", 1990, Fotoforum, Bremen
- 1990: "Volker Hinz – "Area", 1990, Les Rencontres, Arles, Frankreich
- 1982: "Volker Hinz – "Bilder meiner Wirklichkeit", Landesbildstelle, Berlin
- 1979: "Volker Hinz – "Bilder meiner Wirklichkeit", Landesbildstelle, Bremen,
- 1978: "Volker Hinz – "Bilder meiner Wirklichkeit", Landesbildstelle, Hamburg

== Awards ==
- World Press Photo Award, 1973, Volker Hinz, 2nd prize, Portraits
- World Press Photo Award, 1975, Volker Hinz, 2nd prize, People in the News
- World Press Photo Award, 1976, Volker Hinz, 3rd prize, News Features
- ADC Photo Award,
- ADC Photo Award
- Lead Award

== Books ==
- In Love With Photography, by Volker Hinz and Peter-Matthias Gaede (text), Ed. Lammerhuber, Vienna 2015, 424 pages, 371 photos, 1000 signed and numbered copies, ISBN 978-3-903101-00-5
- AREA, ed by Jennifer and Eric Goode, New York: Ed. Abrams 2013, ISBN 978-0-810-9727-66
- Stern Fotografie, Volker Hinz, 67. new edition, Hamburg 2012, Gruner + Jahr, 96 pages in 67 parts, ISBN 978-3-652-00068-0
- Private life of Muhammad Ali Photography by Volker Hinz; A publication by Aplanat Galerie für Fotografie accompanying the Exhibition, Limited ed., 1. ed., Hamburg 2002, Germany: Aplanat Galerie für Fotografie, 63 pages, ISBN 3-922805-74-4
- Jagmandir: Traum als Wirklichkeit; Das exzentrische Privattheater des Maharana, von Udaipur und André Heller, Essay by Jürgen Kesting, Photographs by Volker Hinz and Gabriela Brandenstein, Wien: Brandstätter 1991, 160 pages, ISBN 3-85447-400-8
- Area: photographs, Volker Hinz; Karl Steinorth; Thomas Buchsteiner, Schaffhausen 1990 : Ed. Stemmle, 134 pages, ISBN 3-7231-0414-2

== DVD ==
2013: Dokumentation – Gespräche mit Volker Hinz – Fotograf – A film by Tom Krausz (TKVisuellFilm Hamburg- German language)
