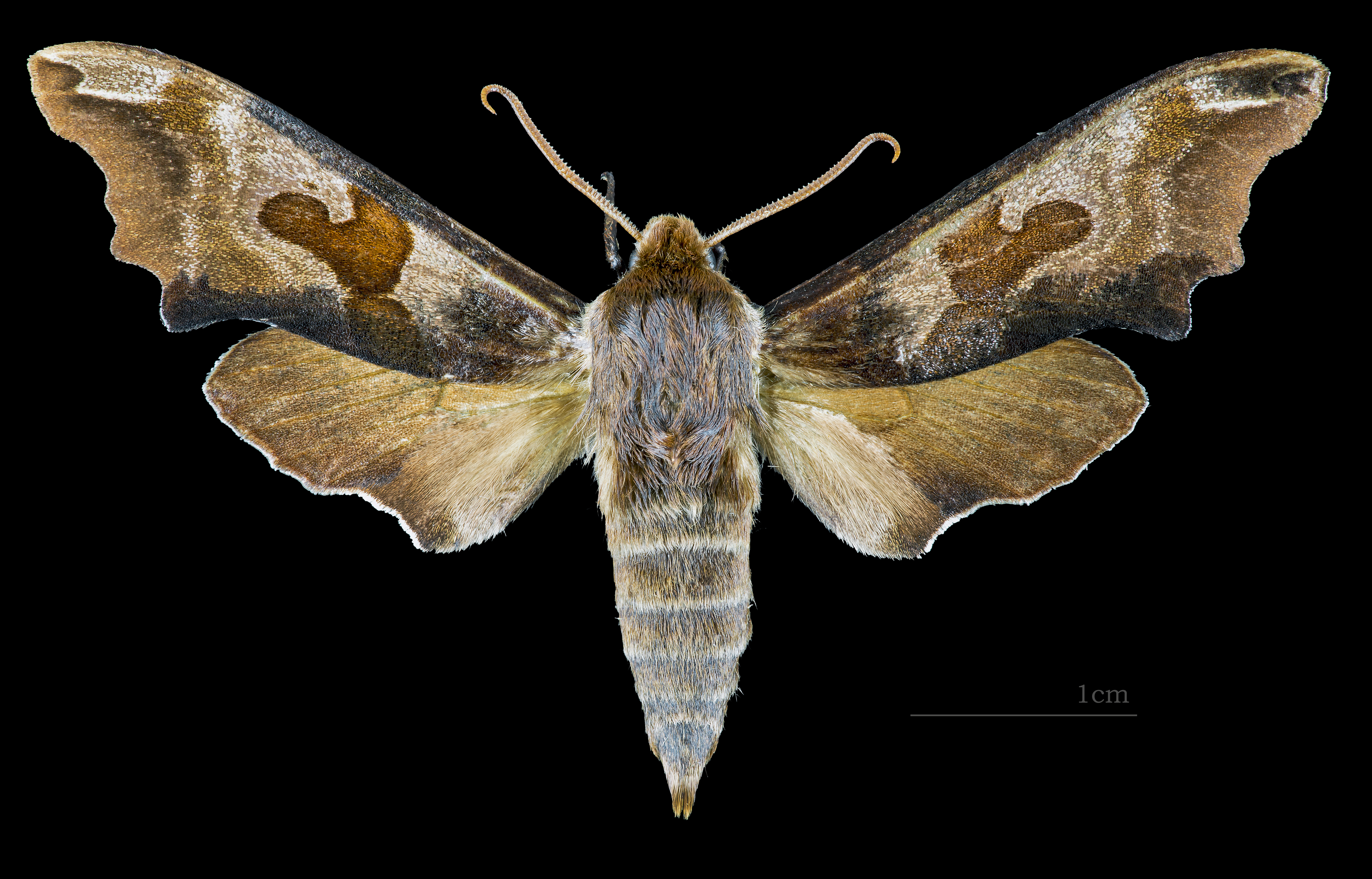
- Male, dorsal view
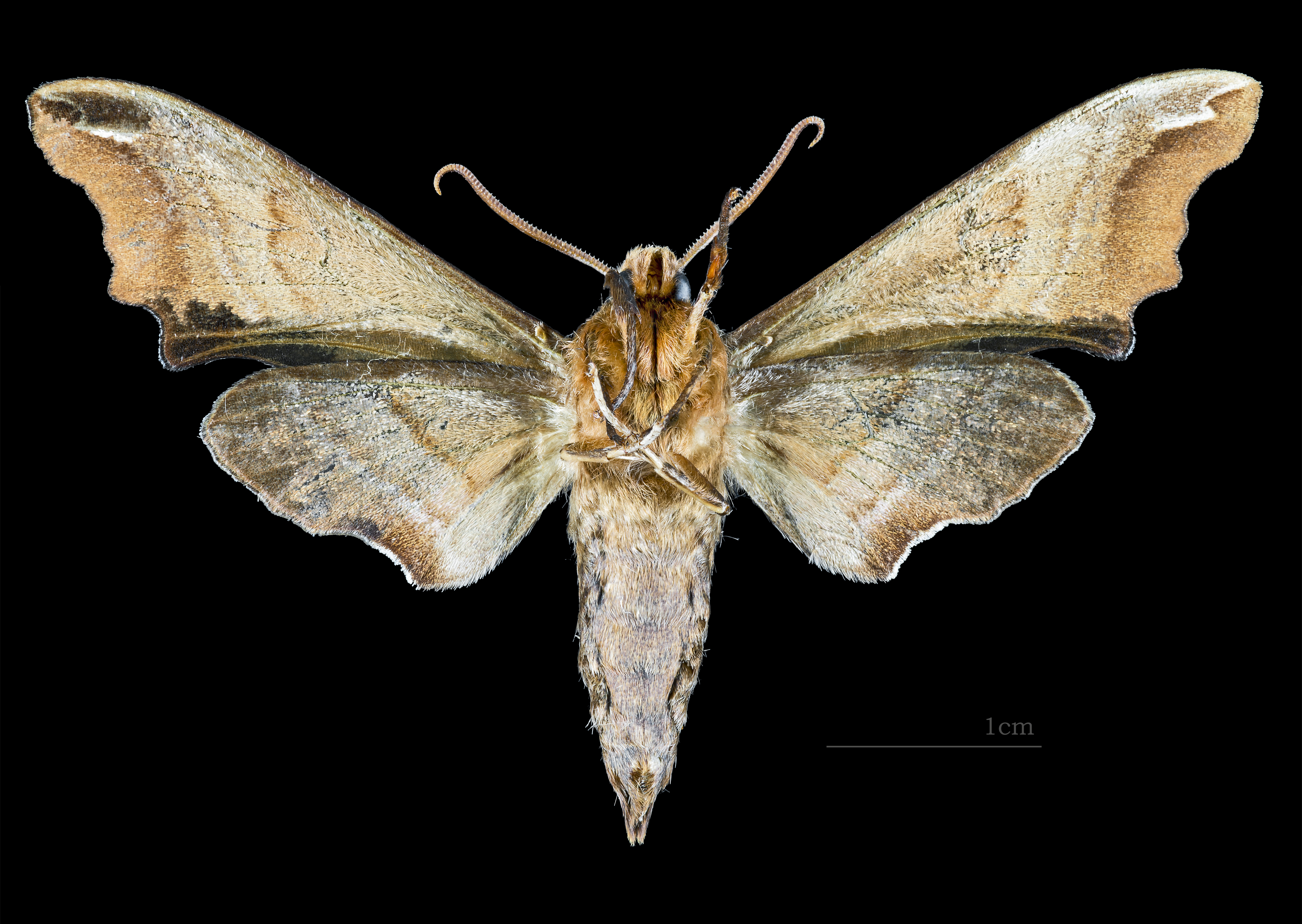
- Male, ventral view

Scientific classification
- Domain: Eukaryota
- Kingdom: Animalia
- Phylum: Arthropoda
- Class: Insecta
- Order: Lepidoptera
- Family: Sphingidae
- Genus: Mimas
- Species: M. christophi

Binomial name
- Mimas christophi (Staudinger, 1887)

Synonyms
- Smerinthus christophi Staudinger, 1887; Mimas christophi pseudotypica O. Bang-Haas, 1936; Smerinthus christophi alni Bartel, 1900

= Mimas christophi =

Species of moth

Mimas christophi, the alder hawkmoth, is a species of moth of the family Sphingidae.

== Distribution ==
It is known from the Russian Far East, north-eastern China, South Korea and northern and central Japan.

== Description ==
The wingspan is 59–77 mm.

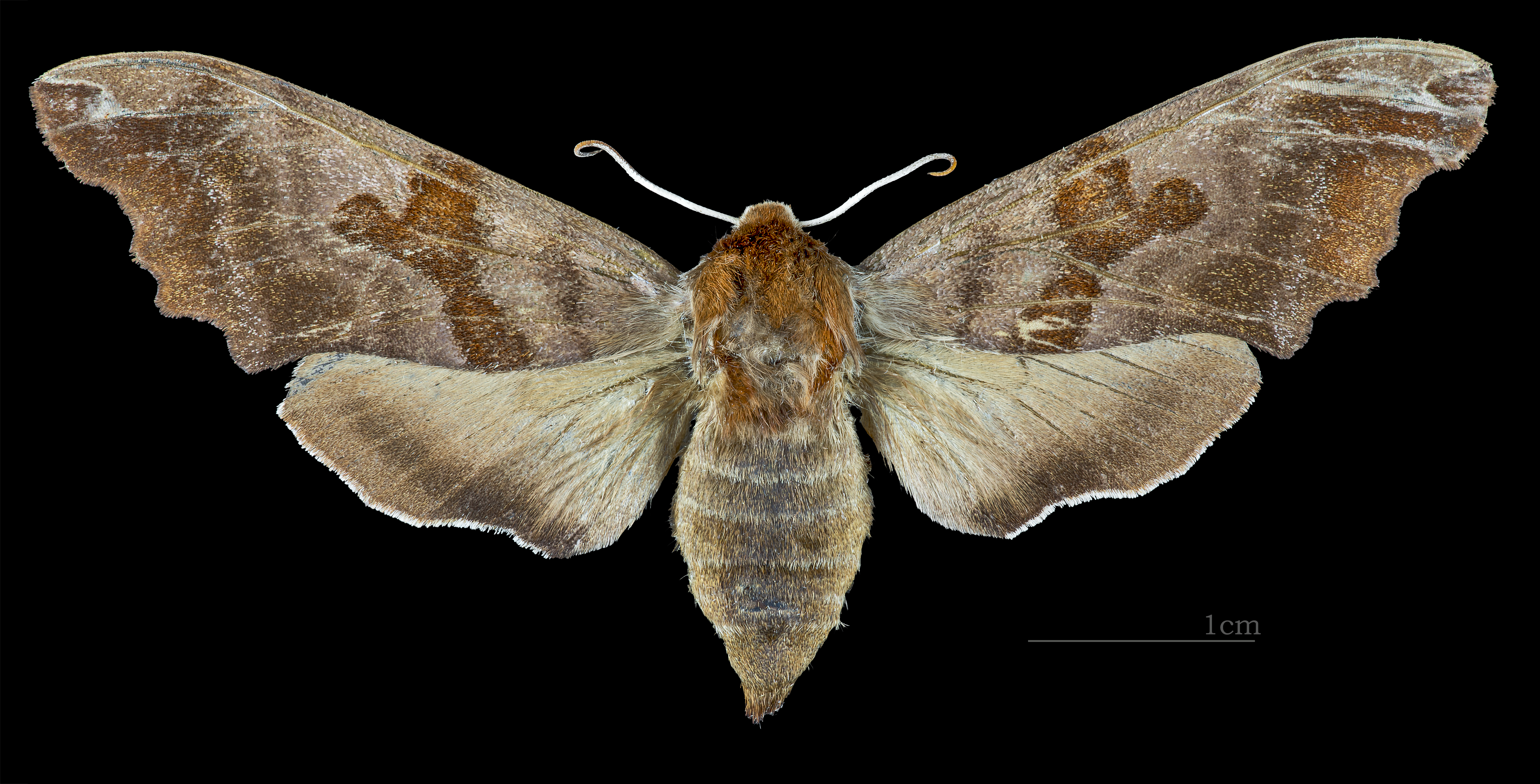
Female

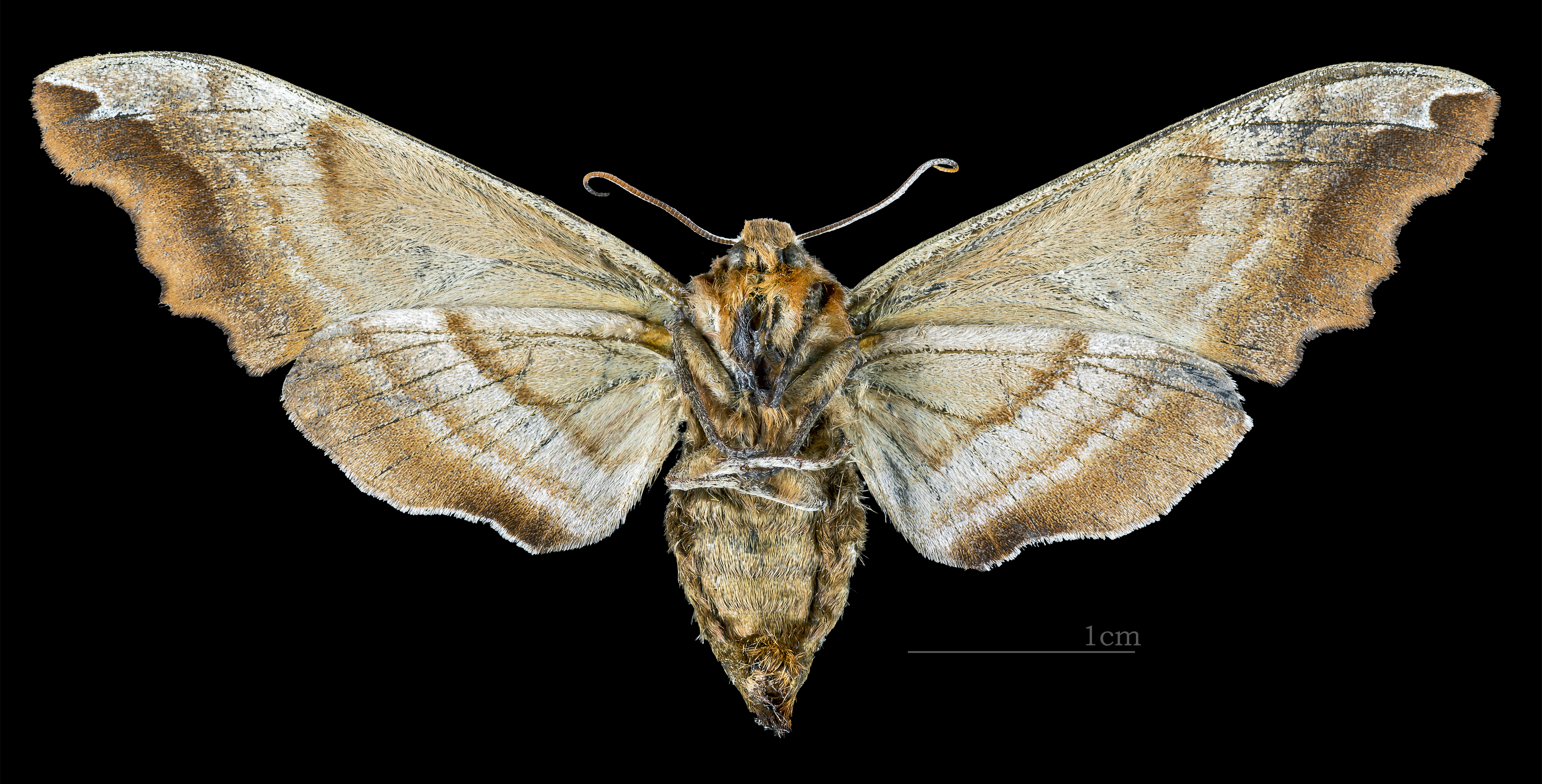
Female underside

== Biology ==
Adults are on wing from late May to late August in Korea.

The larvae have been recorded feeding on Alnus hirsute, Tilia, Acer, Ulmus, Salix and Betula in Primorskiy Kray in Russia and Alnus japonica, Quercus dentata, Ulmus davidiana var. japonica and Tilia amurensis in Korea.
