= Stern (magazine) =

German weekly news magazine

- Cover of the issue from 18 February 2016
- Editor: Gregor Peter Schmitz (since 2022)
- Categories: News magazine
- Frequency: Weekly
- Circulation: 275,000 (Q4 2025)
- Founder: Henri Nannen
- Founded: 1948
- First issue: 1 August 1948; 78 years ago
- Company: Gruner + Jahr
- Country: Germany
- Based in: Hamburg
- Language: German
- Website: www.stern.de
- ISSN: 0039-1239

Stern (pronounced [ʃtɛʁn], German for "Star", stylized in all lowercase) is an illustrated, broadly left-liberal, weekly current affairs magazine published in Hamburg, Germany, by Gruner + Jahr, a subsidiary of Bertelsmann. Under the editorship (1948–1980) of its founder Henri Nannen, it attained a circulation of between 1.5 and 1.8 million, the largest in Europe for a magazine of its kind.

Unusually for a popular magazine in post-war West Germany, and most notably in the contributions to 1975 of Sebastian Haffner, Stern investigated the origin and nature of the preceding tragedies of German history. In 1983, however, its credibility was seriously damaged by its purchase and syndication of the forged Hitler Diaries. A sharp drop in sales anticipated the general fall in newsprint readership in the new century. By 2025, print circulation had fallen to 265,000. However, Stern's profile and readership has been substantially raised by its new digital offerings, including its website, app, and video formats.

== History and profile ==
=== Journalistic style ===
Henri Nannen produced the first 16-page issue (with the actress Hildegard Knef on the cover) on 1 August 1948. Nannen had been able to obtain the licence from the British military government in Hannover despite his wartime service in SS-Standarte Kurt Eggers, a military propaganda unit in Italy. He moved the magazine to Hamburg where, in 1965, he founded Gruner + Jahr, now one of the largest publishing houses in Europe.

Under Nannen's direction, Stern sought to present itself as an exemplar of what is known in Germany as nutzwertiger Journalismus ('useful journalism'). The emphasis is on providing sufficient background on topic to allow readers opportunity to arrive at their own judgements rather than have these decided for them editorially or (as was commonly the case in the tabloid output of rival publisher Axel Springer) in the headlines. As a result, articles tended to be longer and more investigative, while distinguished from those of the similarly directed Der Spiegel by the wider range of social and life-style issues covered, and by a greater reliance of illustration and graphic design.

=== Breaks with the Adenauer consensus ===
Stern was open to the questioning, from a liberal and left perspective, of the post-war political and social order in West Germany identified with the long Chancellorship (1949–1963) of Konrad Adenauer.

In the 1962 Spiegel affair, Stern denounced the effective closure by the government of the magazine's publishing rival as violations of constitutional norms and press freedom. In a contest seen as a key turning point in the culture of the Federal Republic away from the deference demanded by the old Obrigkeitsstaat ('authoritarian state'), Stern (together with Springer Press and Die Zeit) offered Der Spiegel presses, teletypes, and office space so it could continue publishing while being investigated for national security disclosures.

Stern found nothing to extenuate in the later violence of the Red Army Faction (the "Baader Meinhof Gang"), but it had not been completely hostile to the student protest movement during the 1960s, from which the "urban guerillas" first emerged. In June 1967, it permitted Sebastian Haffner to denounce the police response to a demonstration in West Berlin in which student protester Benno Ohnesorg was killed, as "a systematic, cold-blooded, planned pogrom". In contrast, the Springer's Bild Zeitung responded: "Students threaten: We shoot back".

Like the student left, Stern was willing to break the relative post-war silence on the country's National-Socialist past. Haffner, in serialisations, developed his thesis that Hitler's war was a tragedy foretold in the circumstances of German unification in the 19th century. It was a position consistent with editorial support for the Ostpolitik of the new Social-Democratic Chancellor Willi Brandt. As interpreted by many conservatives, this amounted to an acceptance of Germany's postwar division, and territorial losses in the east, as permanent.

Stern (No. 50, 1970) published Sven Simon's (Axel Springer Jr.) iconic picture of Brandt kneeling before the memorial to the Warsaw Ghetto Uprising on 20 Dezember 1970 on a double spread. It was accompanied by an interview with Brandt's Polish host, premier Józef Cyrankiewicz, with whom he had signed the Treaty of Warsaw that day. At the same time, Stern sought to discredit the rival conservative weekly Quick, which, in opposition to the Treaty, had published material from its secret protocols. It accused the magazine's editor Hans van Nouhuys of having been a double agent, at one time in the employ of the East German Stasi. Stern successfully withstood the charge of defamation.

=== Encounters with second-wave feminism ===
On 6 June 1971, in a further challenge to settled post-war conventions, the magazine's front page featured the headline "Wir haben abgetrieben!" ("We've had abortions!"). In an action initiated by Alice Schwarzer, 374 women confessed to having had pregnancies terminated in protest of Paragraph 218 of West Germany's penal code, the Strafgesetzbuch, under which abortion was illegal. The taboo-breaking publicity was viewed by many as a milestone in the feminist revival of the 1970s.

However, Stern itself became the target of the new feminism when, in 1978, Schwarzer and nine other women sued Gruner + Jahr and Nannen on the grounds that the magazine's frequent "cover girls" denied the human dignity of women by presenting them "as a mere sexual object". The immediate occasion was a picture of model Grace Jones, described by Schwarzer in the July 1978 issue of Emma as "a black woman, naked, in her hand a phallic microphone and around the shackles – heavy chains". (It later occurred to Schwarzer that she should also have highlighted the image's blatant racism) Nannen protested that the magazine's nudes should be seen in the same light as Francisco Goya's Naked Maja (1797) and that the freedom of the press was at issue. The complainants proved unable in law to indict soft-pornographic practices that were rife in the popular press, but Nannen allowed that the case had "made us think".

There was no obvious shift in the editorial culture of the magazine. The uncovered "cover-girl" tradition, sometimes in the form of celebrity shoots ("With [[]] alone at home", 10 January 1992), continued. Feminists also had occasion to object to article content. In 1990, Stern published the title story "I am a masochist", in which author Sina-Aline Geißler discussed her literary coming-out as a member of the BDSM scene. This caused an intense public debate, and women later occupied the magazine's editorial offices alarmed at what they believed was a glamorisation of misogynist abuse.

=== Scandal of the Hitler Diaries ===
Following its serialisation, Stern received much more damaging publicity in April 1983, when it published the so-called Hitler Diaries. Scientific examination soon proved that the "diaries", for which the magazine had paid 9.3 million Deutsche Mark, were forgeries. The resulting fiasco led to the resignation of the magazine's editors, a sit-in by staff to protest the "management's bypassing traditional editorial channels and safeguards", and a major press scandal that is still regarded as a low point in German journalism.

A publication "once known for its investigative reporting" became a byword for the folly and hazards of "sensation-seeking check book journalism". Stern's credibility was severely damaged and it took the magazine many years to regain its pre-scandal status and reputation.

=== Trump: Sein Kampf ===
On 24 August 2017, Stern demonstrated its continued ability and willingness to generate front-page controversy (and to discard the restraints of nutzwertiger Journalismus) when it published a Photoshopped image of then-United States President Donald Trump draped in the American flag while giving a stiff-armed Nazi salut. The cover's headline read "Sein Kampf" ("his struggle") – a reference to Adolf Hitler's autobiographical manifesto, Mein Kampf – with the sub-headline "Neo Nazis, Ku Klux Klan, racism: How Donald Trump fuelled hatred in America".

The Los Angeles-based Simon Wiesenthal Center, while critical of President Trump's failure in his remarks after the 12 August "Unite the Right" rally in Charlottesville, Virginia, to "make a distinction between Nazis and KKK protesters and those who opposed them", described "the depiction of the president as a latter-day Hitler by a major German publication" as "untrue and beyond the pale". "Germans", they suggest, "must surely know that by misappropriating [...] Nazi symbols and terms associated with Adolf Hitler, they belittle and becloud the crimes of the past." Jewish leaders in Germany similarly argued that the depiction of Trump as the new Hitler diminished (verharmlost) Nazi genocide.

Stern responded: "The right-wing protesters in Charlottesville raised their arms in the Nazi salute, and the American president has not distanced himself from this gesture or from the mindset of the people. On the contrary, Donald Trump had seen in some of them 'fine people.' With this attitude, he identifies with the protesters and greets them in a transcendent sense – that is exactly what the Stern cover visualises. It is, of course, far from us to want to minimise the atrocities of the National Socialists".

Trump made several other Stern covers thereafter. On the cover of the issue from 19 January 2017, he was seated on the Lincoln Memorial throne, with the headline "The Emperor: How Donald Trump is changing the world and why he is so dangerous for us". For the issue from 10 September 2020, he was depicted in close up with the headline "American Psycho: How Donald Trump is systematically destroying democracy".

=== Diminishing print circulation, growing digital presence ===
Thanks in part, perhaps, to the 1992 closure of Quick, Stern was still selling well over a million copies at the turn of the century. However, its print circulation fell to 896,000 copies in 2010 and to 390,000 in 2020, 50,000 above the illustrated, more-celebrity-oriented weekly Bunte, but falling below that of Der Spiegel for the first time. By October 2023, sales had fallen to 313,200, below both rivals: Der Spiegel at 690,600 and Bunte at 327,043. Two years later, circulation stood at 265,552.

Stern has had an online presence since 1995. In 2025, its e-paper, Stern+ (an app that also includes content from educational magazine Geo and business magazine Capital), had approximately 33,000 digital subscribers and according to Germany's Ad Alliance, through its digital offerings, including its website, app, and video formats, Stern reaches an audience of millions each month. This, combined with a number of high profiled of investigative stories, prompted the trade magazine Kress in 2024 to announce the "Comeback of Stern", ranking it among the most-cited German media outlets. In 2025, the RTL/ntv/Stern media group rose to fifth place in the citation rankings for the first time, placing it ahead of the ARD Group.

== Editors-in-chief ==
- 1948–1980: Henri Nannen
- 1980–1983: Rolf Gillhausen, Peter Koch and Felix Schmidt
- 1983–1984: Rolf Gillhausen with Peter Scholl-Latour
- 1984–1986: Rolf Winter
- 1986–1989: Heiner Bremer, Michael Jürgs and Klaus Liedtke
- 1989–1990: Michael Jürgs with Herbert Riehl-Heyse
- 1990–1994: Rolf Schmidt-Holtz
- 1994–1998: Werner Funk
- 1999–1999: Michael Maier
- 1999–2013: Thomas Osterkorn and Andreas Petzold
- 2013–2014: Dominik Wichmann
- 2014–2018: Christian Krug
- 2019–2022: Florian Gless and Anna-Beeke Gretemeier
- since 2022: Gregor Peter Schmitz and Anna-Beeke Gretemeier

=== Well-known contributors ===
- Niklas Frank, culture editor, son of the National Socialist war criminal Hans Frank
- Willi Glasauer, German visual artist and illustrator.
- Sebastian Haffner, anti-Nazi exile, historian, columnist
- Gerd Heidemann, reporter who acquired the forged Hitler diaries for the magazine in 1983.
- Volker Hinz, photojournalist.
- Erich Kuby, publicist and journalist.
- Robert Lebeck, photojournalist
- Niklaus Meienberg, Swiss writer and journalist.
- Reimar Oltmanns, author and journalist.
- Michael Ruetz, photojournalist.
- Günther Schwarberg, writer, journalist, long-serving editor.

== Logos ==
From August 1948, there are three different logos for this magazine. The first logo was in use from 1948 to 1970, the second logo was in use from 1970 to 2013, and the third and current logo was in use from 2013.

== See also ==
- List of magazines in Germany
