= Christoph A. Geiseler =

American filmmaker and musician

Christoph Alexander Geiseler (born July 13, 1981) is a filmmaker and musician. He is the founder and CEO of Seenfire; he also founded the One Minute Academy and the international charity, MIMA Music, Inc. Geiseler works with the National Geographic Society, Adobe Inc. and Princeton University as a one-minute video expert and video producer. He represents the US Department of State as a Cultural Envoy and a video diplomacy expert; he has produced projects with 65 embassies around the world, ranging from drug violence prevention in Brazilian slums and entrepreneurship training in India, to video workshops for diplomats in Paris.

== Early life and education ==
Geiseler was born in Chicago, Illinois and raised in Los Angeles, CA. He is the son of Dr. Peter J. Geiseler and Annabella Geiseler (née Kohl).

He attended high school at the Flintridge Preparatory School in La Canada Flintridge, as did his brother Alexander and sister Vivian. He graduated with honors from Princeton University in 2004 with an A.B. in Politics. He served as the Princeton University Student Government Social Chair, a DJ on WPRB 103.3fm and was a member of the Terrace Club, one of Princeton's 11 eating clubs. In 2014, he received a master's degree in Public Diplomacy from the Annenberg School of Communications at the University of Southern California.

Geiseler started taking photos at age 10, studied black and white photography at Princeton University with Emmet Gowin and has taken film theory courses at the USC School of Cinematic Arts.

== Career ==
In 2008, Geiseler started producing music videos in underserved communities around the world using the Seenfire trademark. During his Cultural Envoy programs with the US department of state, he started to film, edit and share one minute videos every 24 hours, which he turned into the Seenfire Method. He has taught his method to thousands of students around the world and has produced over 500 videos for sponsors like the National Geographic Society, Condé Nast Publications, the US State Department, Marriott Hotels International, celebrity musicians and luxury travelers.

In 2018, Geiseler invented learning management software called the Seenfire Toolkit that is used by Adobe to train their global enterprise staff to make one minute videos. National Geographic also uses Geiseler's one minute teaching method to train their global network of explorers in public speaking, writing for impact, social media, photography and video production.

Prior to Seenfire, Geiseler served as the founder and executive director of MIMA Music, Inc. which he transformed from an idea in his Politics Thesis at Princeton University into a global music and media network on five continents.

Geiseler has presented his work at Princeton University, MIT's Sloan School of Business, the Manhattan School of Music, the USC's Center on Public Diplomacy and the Create Today Summit at the US Ambassador's residence in Paris, France.

Geiseler has received support from and worked with notable musicians and public figures that include Gilberto Gil, Prince, Leon Mobley, Pete Lockett, the Wailers, George Clinton, Bill Frisell, Robin Quivers, Leon Russell, Pauline Oliveros, Cornel West, Lawrence Lessig and Phoebe Jacobs. His work has been featured on the BBC, Howard Stern Show, TeleMadrid, Huffington Post and NationalGeographic.com.

Geiseler writes about improvisation for the Huffington Post and speaks fluent English, German, French, Spanish, Portuguese and Dutch. He is also an avid mountaineer, motorcyclist and surfer.
