= Mayamas =

Mayamas مياماس Miyamas
- Village
- Location within Syria
- Coordinates: 32°37′00″N 36°41′24″E
- PAL: 308/225
- Country: Syria
- Governorate: Suwayda
- District: Suwayda
- Subdistrict: Suwayda

Population (2004 census)
  - Total: 2,525
- Time zone: UTC+2 (EET)
  - Summer (DST): UTC+3 (EEST)

Mayamas (Arabic: مياماس) is a village in southern Syria, administratively part of the Suwayda District of the Suwayda Governorate. According to the Syria Central Bureau of Statistics (CBS), Mayamas had a population of 2,525 in the 2004 census. Its inhabitants are predominantly Druze, with a Sunni Muslim Bedouin minority.

== History ==
In 1596 the village appeared under the name of Mimas in the Ottoman tax registers as part of the nahiya (subdistrict) of Bani Nasiyya in the qadaa of Hauran. It had a population of 4 households, all Muslim, who paid a fixed tax-rate of 25% on agricultural products, including wheat (350 a.), barley (180 a.), summer crops (60 a), goats and beehives (6 a.); the taxes totalled 650 akçe.

== Religious buildings ==
- Maqam al-Kilmah (Druze Shrine)

== See also ==
- Druze in Syria

== Bibliography ==
- Hütteroth, W.-D.; Abdulfattah, K. (1977). Historical Geography of Palestine, Transjordan and Southern Syria in the Late 16th Century. Erlanger Geographische Arbeiten, Sonderband 5. Erlangen, Germany: Vorstand der Fränkischen Geographischen Gesellschaft. ISBN 3-920405-41-2.
