= Modern Improvisational Music Association =

MIMA Music, Inc., also referred to as MIMA or MIMA Music, is a public charity and 501(c)3 tax-exempt nonprofit founded in Princeton, New Jersey. "MIMA" is an acronym that stands for "Modern Improvisational Music Appreciation."

MIMA's mission is to build and celebrate community by inspiring and transforming people through music. It offers music-making workshops in underprivileged communities and trains young volunteers to lead these workshops in their home communities. Improvisation is a value central to the organization's approach to social outreach and music education.

MIMA is based in the United States, and its network includes musicians and partners in Argentina, Brazil, China, Cyprus, England, France, Germany, Jamaica and Spain. The nonprofit has hosted programs in a number of American and European countries, working together with institutions like the US State Department, Princeton University, and the Google Foundation.

MIMA's flagship program is its songwriting workshop, in which it helps groups of youth or adult students compose and record an original song, often producing a music video at the same time. MIMA's other programs include music-based leadership training programs and teacher training programs for its own teachers.

MIMA has developed its own teaching methodology that includes interactive group musical exercises, leadership training based on musical improvisation, and a repertoire of original songs and recordings.

== Beginnings ==
Starting in 2000, four Princeton University students launched a college social movement to bring university students together through improvised music. Current MIMA Music trustees Adam Nemett and Christoph A. Geiseler led the student group at Princeton by organizing jam sessions and DJ events. They called the student group "MIMA," standing for "Modern Improvisational Music Appreciation." Other early MIMA events included drum circles, a national capoeira event, and an academic conference on electro-acoustic music.

In 2004 Christoph Geiseler wrote his Princeton politics thesis about MIMA as a nonprofit business proposal. He incorporated the nonprofit charity MIMA Music, Inc., enlisted his Princeton thesis advisors as business advisors and launched the first songwriting program in Trenton, NJ.

== History ==
From 2004 to 2010, MIMA hosted a number of outreach programs in the Americas, Europe and Asia. Sponsors and partners varied by program but included the US State Department, Princeton University, the Google Foundation, the Bank of America Foundation, the Edward T. Cone Foundation, the Checkpoint Charlie Foundation, Remo Drums, Scion and Afroreggae. MIMA also has collaborated closely with percussionist Leon Mobley, who has appeared as a guest teacher and musician at several MIMA programs dating back to the early 2000s.

MIMA has produced music videos and video documentaries in China (2005), Brazil (2006, 2008, 2009 and 2010), Germany (2008), Argentina (2009 and 2010), England (2010), Cyprus (2010) and the USA (2010).

== Awards ==
The 2006 DeLucia Award
