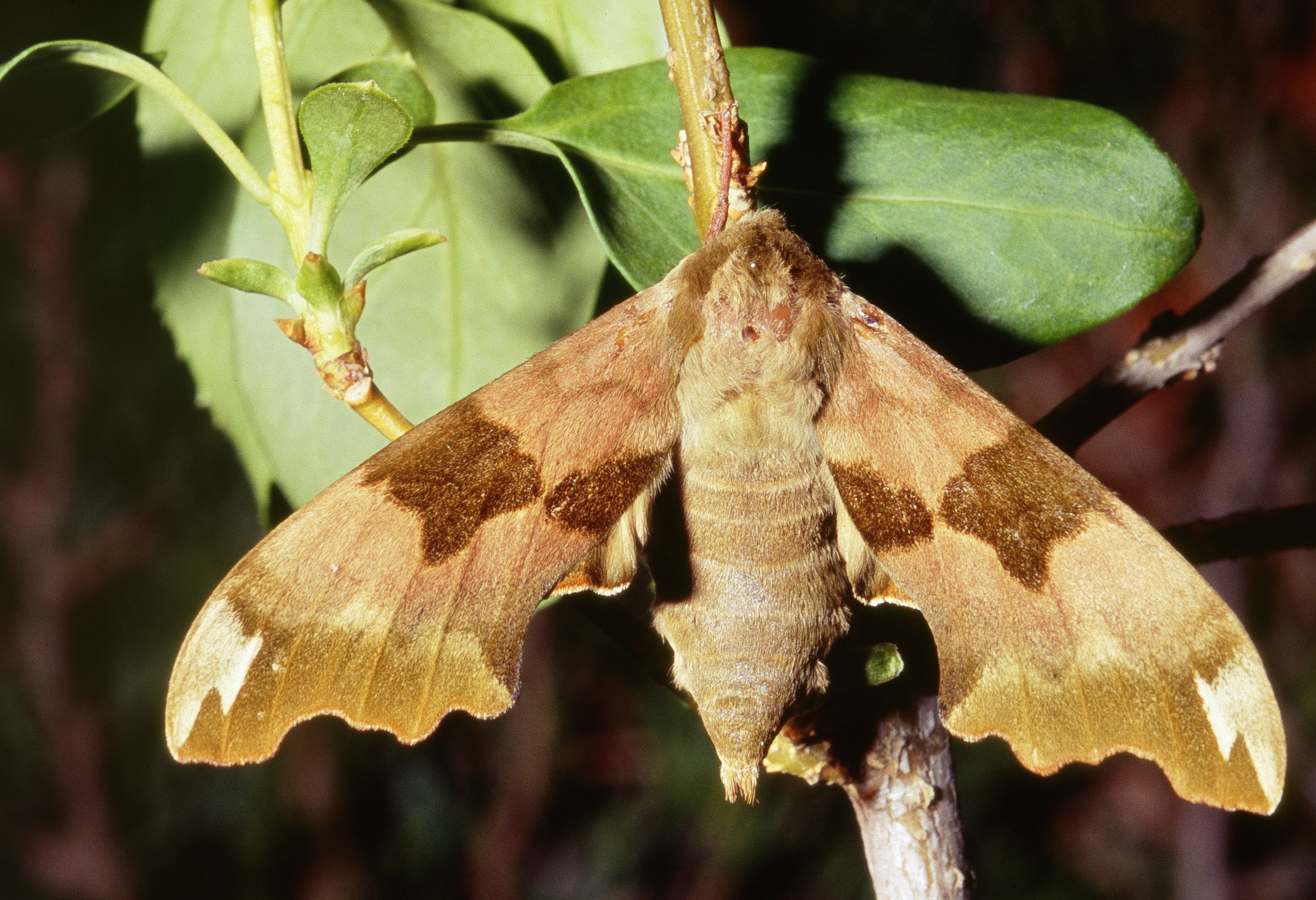
- Mimas tiliae

Scientific classification
- Domain: Eukaryota
- Kingdom: Animalia
- Phylum: Arthropoda
- Class: Insecta
- Order: Lepidoptera
- Family: Sphingidae
- Tribe: Mimatini
- Genus: Mimas; Hübner, 1819

Synonyms
- Lucena Rambur, 1840

= Mimas (moth) =

Genus of moths

Mimas is a genus of moths in the family Sphingidae first described by Jacob Hübner in 1819.

== Species ==
- Mimas christophi (Staudinger 1887)
- Mimas tiliae (Linnaeus 1758)

== Gallery ==
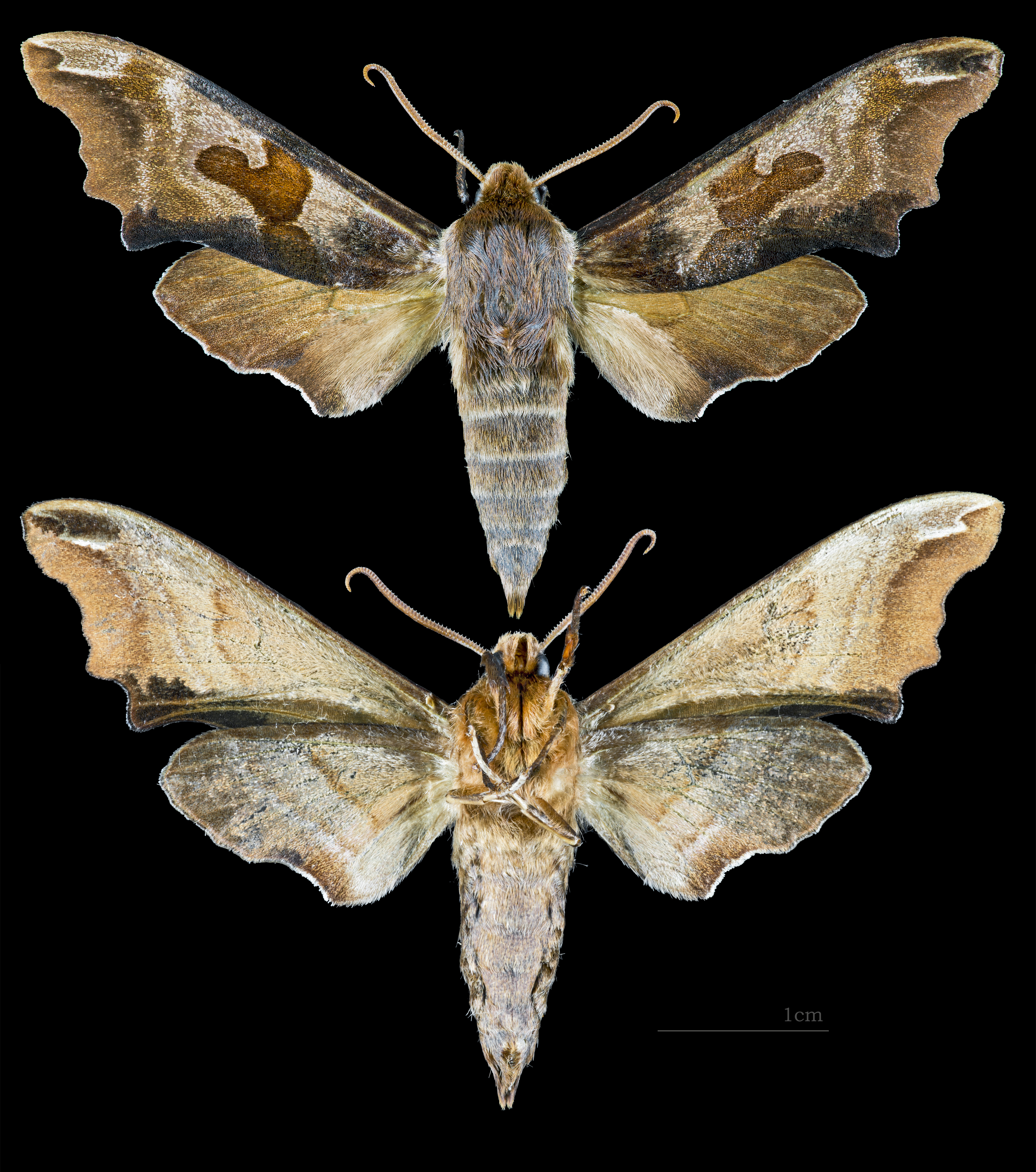
Mimas christophi

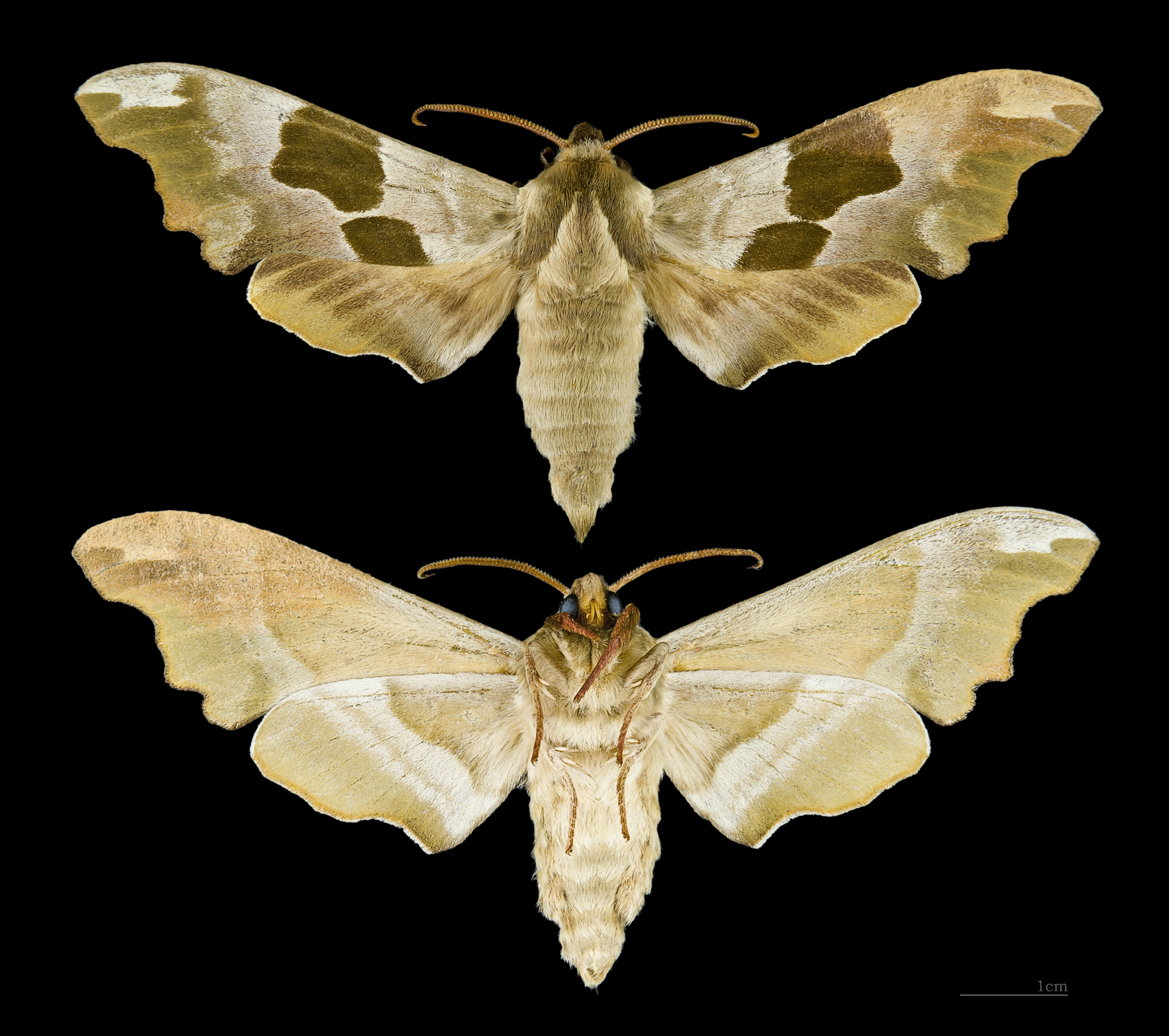
Mimas tiliae
