= Peter Geisler =

German clarinetist

Peter Geisler is a German clarinetist. He was a member of the Berlin Philharmonic Orchestra and Scharoun Ensemble. He plays on an Öhler system clarinet.

== Discography ==
- Mozart: 6 Notturni; Divertimenti, with various artists. Orfeo, 1991.
- Mozart: Divertimenti, KV166, KV186, with various artists. Orfeo, 1994.
