= Sina-Aline Geißler =

German writer and journalist

Sina-Aline Geißler (born 1965) is a German writer and journalist. In an autobiography published in 1990, when she was just 24, she came out as a member of the BDSM scene as a self-admitted masochist. A great media coverage followed including a major cover story in German Stern magazine under the title Ich bin Masochistin - Sina Geißler, 24, bricht ein Tabu (″I am a masochist: Sina Geißler, 24, breaking a taboo″).

After the publication, Stern became a target of some vocal feminist movement leaders and some protesters occupied the magazine's offices in protest blaming the magazine for glorification of violence considering its coverage as an invitation to insult and rape women and girls.

In a sequel book, Geißler published a series of stories depicting sadomasochistic women in erotic fantasies. Three of the stories had already been published in the German BDSM publication Schlagzeilen.

== Publications ==
- Lust an der Unterwerfung. Frauen bekennen sich zum Masochismus. (Heyne 1992)
- Mut zur Demut. Erotische Phantasien von Frauen. 2. Auflage (Hestia 1992)
- Doppelte Lust. Bisexualität heute - Erfahrungen und Erkenntnisse. (Scherz 1993)
- Immer, wenn ich mich verführe. Weibliche Selbstbefriedigung - ein Tabu wird gebrochen. (Hestia 1994)
- Im Namen der Liebe. Sechzehn ungewöhnliche Geschichten. (Heyne 1994)
- Freundin oder Feindin. Rivalität zwischen Frauen. (Heyne 1995)
- Der Lolita-Komplex. Wenn ältere Männer junge Frauen lieben. (co-authorship with Wolfgang Bergmann), (Heyne 1995)
- Die Wünsche der Frauen. Erotische Phantasien um Macht und Liebe. (Pabel-Moewig 2005)
- Verführ mich. CD. Frauen erzählen. (Audio-CD) (EFF ESS Verlag, Bonn 2005)
