= Geiszler =

Geiszler is a surname. It is an archaic variant of the surname Geissler.

This form of surname is very rare in Germany.

Notable people with the surname include:

- Arland Geiszler, former mayor of Rugby, North Dakota
- Johann Geiszler (born 1926), Austrian rower
- Newton Geiszler, character in the Pacific Rim film series

== See also ==
- Geiseler
