= Biographical research =

Qualitative research approach aligned to the social interpretive paradigm of research

Biographical research is a qualitative research approach aligned to the social interpretive paradigm of research. Biographical research is concerned with the reconstruction of life histories and the constitution of meaning based on biographical narratives and documents. The material for analysis consists of interview protocols (memorandums), video recordings, photographs, and a diversity of sources. These documents are evaluated and interpreted according to specific rules and criteria. The starting point for this approach is the understanding of an individual biography in terms of its social constitution. The biographical approach was influenced by the symbolic interactionism, the phenomenological sociology of knowledge (Alfred Schütz, Peter L. Berger, and Thomas Luckmann), and ethnomethodology (Harold Garfinkel). Therefore, biography is understood in terms of a social construct and the reconstruction of biographies can give insight on social processes and figurations (as in Norbert Elias), thus helping to bridge the gap between micro-, meso-, and macro- levels of analysis. The biographical approach is particularly important in German sociology. This approach is used in the Social Sciences as well as in Pedagogy and other disciplines. The Research Committee 38 "Biography and Society" of the International Sociological Association (ISA) was created in 1984 and is dedicated "to help develop a better understanding of the relations between individual lives, the social structures and historical processes within which they take shape and which they contribute to shape, and the individual accounts of biographical experience (such as life stories or autobiographies)".

== History ==
Biographies, including autobiographies, have always contained a sociological dimension since their advent in the Antiquity (Plutarch). For the most part of the usage of this notion, biographers dealt with outstanding individual personalities (such as politicians and artists) but there were also exceptions, such as Ulrich Bräker's autobiography, "The Poor Man of Toggenburg" (Der arme Mann im Toggenburg). The emergence of Sociology influenced an approach to biography that extended this notion beyond the individual dimension, such as the works of Alphons Silbermann on the life of the composer Jacques Offenbach and Norbert Elias on the life of Wolfgang Amadeus Mozart.

=== Biography as a form of access to larger groupings ===
The biographical method as a research approach to understand larger groupings was used as sociological material by Florian Znaniecki and William Isaac Thomas in the 1920s. After their work, the biographical approach was considered amongst the dominant research approaches in empirical social research. The study The Polish Peasant in Europe and America (1918–1920) by Znaniecki and Thomas used an extensive collection of diaries, letters, memoirs, autobiographies, and other personal and archival documents as main source for a sociological investigation. The reception of this work was initially late due to linguistic barriers, but it was then absorbed and disseminated in the Social Science Research Council (SSRC). The biographical research approach formed an important foundation for the development of the Chicago School, which later influenced the symbolic interactionism and the work of sociologists such as Robert E. Park, Ernest W. Burgess, and George Herbert Mead.

Another milestone in the development of biographical research was the analysis of the life course of delinquent youths written by Clifford R. Shaw in 1930 and 1931. After 1945, the interest in biographical research declined due to the success of quantitative methods and structural-functionalist theories. The biographical approach influence was felt mainly in the study of deviance. In 1978, Aaron Victor Cicourel published a case study on the life history of a boy named Mark, that received special attention in the discipline of social work. Cicourel's study explored in detail how a criminal career was constructed through police interrogation, individual and distorted interpretations, and institutional documents.

=== Recent research ===
Since the 1980s, biographical research gained momentum in the wake of a growing interest for qualitative social research. Biographical research is now a recognized approach in sociology, especially in the German Sociological Tradition (see Fritz Schütze, Martin Kohli, Werner Fuchs-Heinritz and others). This development was supported by a tendency to shift the sociological focus from system and structure to the lifeworld, the everyday life, and the resurgence of phenomenological approaches in sociology (under the influence of Edmund Husserl). The sociology turned to the reconstruction of biographical cases and individual life courses as a form to gain insight on social processes.

With the increasing pluralization of life-worlds, modernization, and differentiation in Postmodern societies, the dissolution of traditional values and the conference of meaning, the biographical approach proved useful to study these social phenomena of the turn of the millennium. The actor became an intersection of different and sometimes divergent determinants, logics, expectations, normative models, and institutionalized mechanisms of control (see Georg Simmel's chapter "The Intersection of Social Circles"). The "normal biography" broke up and prompted the individual to manage his life course on his own and to find solutions amongst different and contradictory influencing factors and figurations. In this situation, the self-discovered biographical identity with its endangered transitions, breaks, and status changes becomes a conflict between institutional control and individual strategy.

The reconstructive approach in biographical research, which is connected to the phenomenological and Gestalt approaches, was methodologically developed by the German sociologist Gabriele Rosenthal. Rosenthal used principles of the method of objective hermeneutics and the reconstructive analysis of Ulrich Oevermann, and the Gestalt and structure considerations proposed by Aron Gurwitsch and Kurt Koffka to develop a method for the reconstruction of biographical cases.

== Methods and limitations ==
=== Individual cases and inductive generalizations ===
In the context of qualitative researches, the biographical research is to be seen as a case-reconstructive approach. The decision to reconstruct cases is in itself an approach to the field rather than a specific research method. Biographical research does not use a single method for data analysis. The most commonly used methods for data construction in biographical research is the biographical narrative interview (see Fritz Schütze) and/or open interviews. Many use content analysis to analyze the biographical data. The diversity of biographical sources turns an inductive approach, as used in quantitative social research, unfruitful. The logic of an abductive reasoning process is preferred by many researchers that use the biographical approach. The principles of a grounded theory (as in Barney Glaser and Anselm Strauss) are often applied alongside a biographical research.

The questions regarding the possibility to use individual cases to create scientifically valid generalizations arise from the use of the abductive reasoning. This is the question of the sustainability of abductive conclusions (as in Charles Sanders Peirce). The abductive conclusion that biographical cases are socially relevant and bear general patterns of behavior, action, and interpretation in them is common in sociological practice, although some think that it is not yet fully developed. Different approaches to the development of typologies exist, as well as for the contrastive comparison between types in order to allow for theoretical generalizations (see Uta Gerhardt, 1984; Gabriele Rosenthal, 1993; and Susann Kluge, 2000).

=== Experienced life history and narrated life story (erlebte und erzählte Lebensgeschichte) ===
A fundamental problem exists regarding the differences between the levels of the experienced (erlebte) life history and the narrated (erzählte) life story. Another fundamental implication is the interrelation of experience, memory, and narration. In the early studies of biographical research, great value was placed on the reconstruction of the actual life course of the individual using data from additional sources (such as institutional archives, diaries, interviews with relatives and friends, etc.) and thus eliminating "errors" in the memory and presentation of the interviewee. Today – according to the phenomenological "bracketing" of the being of objects (as by the grounded theory principles) – it is increasingly assumed that the actual life course cannot be reconstructed: experiences are always interpreted by the subject and are mediated by perception, thus constituting the memory in regard to the framework of the overall biography as well as to the situation (for more, see Erving Goffmann notion of frame analysis) where the narrative is collected.

Thus, the main concern of the biographical research should be the life as experiences and narrated by subjects in clear contrast to the "true facts" of a life course reconstruction. Interpretations and constructions of meaning are of utmost importance to reconstruct a biographical case, as the actions and the self-interpretation of these actions by the individual turns his own biography into a coherent totality. Based on empirical experiences with narrated life history and using the research method of biographical narrative interviews, the method of biographical case reconstruction has developed in the last decades in fields that range from the study of migration to professional careers and healthcare.

=== Reconstruction of the latent structures of meaning ===
The question of the construction of meaning leads to the questions of the subjectively intended and the objective meaning. Ulrich Oevermann says that an actor in a situation of interaction produces more meaning than he is aware of. Therefore, some researchers consider the task of the biographical research to be the reconstruction of both types of meaning – the intended and the objective. Behind and below the interpretations expressed by the interviewees are the latent structures of meaning that constitute the sense of life and manifest themselves in biographical life situations. In these latent, hidden patterns of meaning, individual experience and societal conditioning are intertwined. Thus, behind individual action lies a direction and a framework for action. According to Heinz Bude, the method of objective hermeneutics and reconstruction of structures of meaning is used in biographical research as a method for the reconstruction of the latent structures of meaning at play in specific situations of a case
