= Gabriele Rosenthal =

German sociologist

Professor Gabriele Rosenthal
- Born: 19 April 1954 (age 72); Schwenningen am Neckar, Germany

Academic background
- Education: University of Konstanz Bielefeld University University of Kassel
- Influences: Weber; Mannheim; Mead; Husserl; Schütz; Peirce; Luckmann; Berger; Koffka; Gurwitsch; Elias; Garfinkel; Goffman; Schütze

Academic work
- Discipline: Sociology
- Sub-discipline: Sociology of knowledge; Qualitative research; Biographical research; Interpretive research
- Institutions: Methodenzentrum Sozialwissenschaften (MZS) - University of Göttingen
- Main interests: Biographical research; Sociology of immigration; Sociology of knowledge

Gabriele Rosenthal (born 19 April 1954 in Schwenningen am Neckar, Germany) is a German sociologist and head of Department for Qualitative Methods of the Center for Methods in Social Sciences (Methodenzentrum Sozialwissenschaften) of the University of Göttingen, Germany. Rosenthal is recognized for the introduction of the method of biographical case reconstruction using biographical narrative interviews (Fritz Schütze). She is known for systemizing the influences of the Gestalt theory (Aron Gurwitsch and Kurt Koffka), the sociology of knowledge (Karl Mannheim, Alfred Schütz, Thomas Luckmann and Peter L. Berger), and the sociology of figurations and processes (Norbert Elias) to explain the interrelationship between experience, memory and narrative, as well as how social figurations intertwine with individual biographies.

== Life ==
Gabriele Rosenthal was born in Schwenningen am Neckar in Baden-Württemberg, Germany. She studied sociology, political sciences and psychology at the University of Konstanz. Parallel, she was trained as family therapist. She received her PhD in 1986 from Bielefeld University and her habilitation from the University of Kassel in 1993. Gabriele Rosenthal was also a researcher at the Free University of Berlin, guest lecturer at the Ben-Gurion University of the Negev, Israel, and held visiting and associate professorships in Vienna, Cologne, Kassel, and Porto Alegre. In 2002, she was appointed Professor at the Center of Methods in Social Sciences, Göttingen University. From 2009 until 2011, she served as Dean of the Faculty of the Social Sciences of the University of Göttingen. From 2002 until 2010, Gabriele Rosenthal was the President of the Research Committee 38 “Biography and Society” of the International Sociological Association (ISA). She chaired the section on biographical research of the German Sociological Association (DGS) between 1999 and 2003. Gabriele Rosenthal was a member of the Board of the German Sociological Association between 2019 and 2021.

== Research interests ==
Gabriele Rosenthal is renowned for her contribution to biographical research and generation research in the qualitative social sciences. She has worked on the gestalt and structure of biographical self-presentations, drawing on gestalt theoretical considerations by Aron Gurwitsch and Kurt Koffka to explain the dialectic relation of experience, memory, and narration. Amongst others, she helped conceptualizing biography as a concept which transgresses the dualism of subject and society (Rosenthal 1995). Further influences on Rosenthal’s approach include the Sociology of knowledge (especially Alfred Schütz, Karl Mannheim, Thomas Luckmann and Peter L. Berger), and the Figurational Sociology of Norbert Elias.

In the context of the research project ‘The Holocaust in the Life of Three Generations’, she focussed on the experiences of Holocaust survivors as well as those of Nazi perpetrators and the impacts of these on subsequent generations (Rosenthal 2009b). Rosenthal’s work deals with migration, ethnic belonging and intergenerational transmission of experiences. She approaches current social problems such as the impacts of violence, war, enslavement and forced migration through transnational research, using comparative case reconstructions (on the levels of biography, family, and milieu). Gabriele Rosenthal has conducted research in Israel, Palestine, Florida (USA), Ukraine, Kazakhstan, Uganda, Ghana, Jordan, the Spanish enclaves (Ceuta and Melilla), and Brazil.

Her approach to biographical research was outlined in her book Interpretive Social Research (five German editions 2005–2015; 2018), in which she presents both the data construction method of biographical narrative interviews as well as the biographical case reconstruction method for data analysis.

== Selected research projects ==
- Individual and collective memories of slavery and the slave trade: A contrastive comparison of different communities, generations and groupings in Ghana and Brazil (2022-2025) (funded by the German Research Foundation)
- Biographies of migrants from Syria and West Africa in Brazil and in Germany – Processes of inclusion and participation in the context of so-called irregular migration (2019-2022) (funded by the German Research Foundation)
- Dynamic figurations of refugees, migrants, and longtime residents in Jordan since 1946: between peaceable and tension-ridden co-existence? (2017-2020) (funded by the German Research Foundation)
- The Social Construction of Border Zones: A Comparison of Two Geopolitical Cases (Morocco/Ceuta and Melilla; Egypt/Israel) (2014-2019) (funded by the German Research Foundation)
- Child Soldiers in context. Biographies, familial and collective trajectories in northern Uganda (2014-2017) (funded by the German Research Foundation)
- Belonging to the Outsider and Established Groupings: Palestinians and Israelis in Various Figurations (2010-2015) (funded by the German Research Foundation)
- Collective Myths and Their Transgenerational Impacts – Germans in and From the Former USSR (2007-2011) (funded by the German Research Foundation)
- Victims of War in North Uganda: Life Stories and Public Discourses
- Biographical Case Studies of Juveniles in the Context of Education Programs (2004-2005)
- Biography and Ethnicity: Development and Changes of the Sense of Socio-Cultural Belonging in Migrant Populations in the US and Germany (2006-2009)
- The Holocaust in the Life of Three Generations (1992-1996)

== Selected works ==
In English:

- Rosenthal, G. (2018): Interpretive Social Research. An Introduction. Göttingen: Universitätsverlag Göttingen.
- Rosenthal, G. / Bogner, A. (2017): Biographies in the Global South: Life stories embedded in figurations and discourses. Frankfurt a. M.: Campus.
- Rosenthal, G. (Ed.) (2016): Established and Outsiders at the Same Time. Self-Images and We-Images of Palestinians in the West Bank and in Israel. Göttingen: Göttingen University Press.
- Rosenthal, G. (2012): ‘A Plea for a More Interpretative, More Empirical and More Historical Sociology.’ In: Kalekin-Fishman, D. / Denis, A. B. (Eds.): Tradition and Renewal: the Shape of Sociology for the Twenty-First Century. Sage, 202-217.
- Rosenthal, G. / Bogner, A. (Eds.) (2009a): Ethnicity, Belonging and Biography. Ethnographical and Biographical Perspectives. Münster: LIT Verlag / New Brunswick: Transaction.
- Rosenthal, G. (Ed.) (2009b): The Holocaust in Three-Generations. Families of Victims and Perpetrators of the Nazi-Regime. Opladen: Barbara Budrich.
- Rosenthal, G. (2006): ‘The Narrated Life Story: On the Interrelation Between Experience, Memory and Narration.’ In: Milnes, K., Horrocks, C., Kelly, N., Roberts, B. and Robinson, D. (Eds.) Narrative, Memory and Knowledge: Representations, Aesthetics and Contexts. Huddersfield: University of Huddersfield Press, 1 –16.
- Rosenthal, G. (2004): ‘Biographical Research.’ In: Seale, C. / Gobo, G. / Gubrium, J. F. / Silverman, D. (Eds.): Qualitative Research Practice. London: Sage, 48-64.

In German:

- Bogner, A. / Rosenthal, G. (2018): KindersoldatInnen im Kontext. Biographien, familien- und kollektivgeschichtliche Verläufe in Norduganda. Göttingen: Universitätsverlag Göttingen.
- Rosenthal, G. (Hg.) (2015): Etablierte und Außenseiter zugleich: Selbst- und Fremdbilder von Palästinensern im Westjordanland und in Israel. Frankfurt a. M.: Campus.
- Rosenthal, G. / Stephan, V. / Radenbach, N. (Eds.) (2011a): Brüchige Zugehörigkeiten. Wie sich Familien von ‘Russlanddeutschen‘ ihre Geschichte erzählen. Frankfurt a. M.: Campus.
- Rosenthal, G. (2011b): Interpretative Sozialforschung. Weinheim und München: Juventa; 3rd edition.
- Rosenthal, G. (1995): Erlebte und erzählte Lebensgeschichte. Gestalt und Struktur biographischer Selbstbeschreibungen. Frankfurt a. M.: Campus.
- Rosenthal, G. (Ed.) (1990): ‘Als der Krieg kam, hatte ich mit Hitler nichts mehr zu tun‘. Zur Gegenwärtigkeit des ‘Dritten Reiches’ in erzählten Lebensgeschichten. Opladen: Leske & Budrich.
