= Life history (sociology) =

Interviewing method

Life history is an interviewing method used to record autobiographical history from an ordinary person's perspective, often gathered from traditionally marginalized groups. It was begun by anthropologists studying Native American groups around the 1900s, and was taken up by sociologists and other scholars, though its popularity has waxed and waned since. One of the major strengths of the life history method is that it provides a kind of voice from a social milieu that is often overlooked or indeed invisible in intellectual discourse.

== Life history method ==
The method was first used when interviewing indigenous peoples of the Americas and specifically Native American leaders who were asked by an interviewer to describe their lives with an insight as to what it was like to be that particular person. The purpose of the interview was to capture a living picture of a disappearing (as such) people/way of life.

Later the method was used to interview criminals and prostitutes in Chicago. Interviewers looked at social and police-records, as well as the society in general, and asked subjects to talk about their lives. The resulting report discussed (i) Chicago at that particular time; (ii) how the subject viewed their own life (i.e. 'how it was like to be this particular person') and (iii) how society viewed the subject and whether they would be incarcerated, receive help, perform social work, etc.

The landmark of the life history method was developed in the 1920s and most significantly embodied in The Polish Peasant in Europe and America by W. I. Thomas and Florian Znaniecki. The authors employed a Polish immigrant to write his own life story which they then interpreted and analyzed. According to Martin Bulmer, it was "the first systematically collected sociological life history".

The approach later lost momentum as quantitative methods became more prevalent in American sociology. The method was revived in the 1970s, mainly through the efforts of French sociologist Daniel Bertaux and Paul Thompson whose life history research focused on such professions as bakers and fishermen. Major initiatives of the life history method were undertaken also in Germany, Italy, and Finland.

In the German context, the life history method is closely associated with the development of biographical research and biographical-narrative interviews. The narrative interview as a method for conducting open narrative interviews in empirical social research was developed in Germany around 1975. It borrowed concepts from phenomenology (Alfred Schütz), symbolic interactionism (George Herbert Mead), ethnomethodology (Harold Garfinkel), and sociology of knowledge (Karl Mannheim). The development and improvement of the method are closely connected to German sociologist Fritz Schütze, part of the Bielefeld Sociologist's Working Group, which maintained close academic cooperation with American sociolinguists and social scientists such as Erving Goffman, Harvey Sacks, John Gumpertz, and Anselm Strauss. The analysis of life histories was further developed by the biographical case reconstruction method of German sociologist Gabriele Rosenthal for the analysis of life history and life story. Rosenthal differentiates between the level of analysis of the narrated life story (erzählte Lebensgeshichte) and the experienced life history (erlebte Lebensgeschichte).

== Technique ==
In this method, the interviewer allows the subject to tell the story of their life on their own terms, as opposed to those of the researcher. It is common practice to begin the interview with the subject's early childhood and to proceed chronologically to the present. Another approach, dating from the Polish Peasant, is to ask participants to write their own life stories. This can be done either through competitions (as in Poland, Finland or Italy) or by collecting written life stories written spontaneously. In these countries, there are already large collections of life stories, which can be used by researchers.
