= Sociology of knowledge approach to discourse =

Social science research method

The sociology of knowledge approach to discourse (SKAD) is a social science research programme for studying discourse developed by Reiner Keller in order to analyze knowledge relationships and conditions in society. SKAD stems from the sociology of knowledge of Peter L. Berger and Thomas Luckmann who in the 1960s studied the processes involved in the social construction of generally accessible everyday knowledge in their defining work, The Social Construction of Reality. Keller combines this approach with Michel Foucault's discourse theory, which is responsible for the prominent role of discourse concepts in social science and inspired several approaches to discourse analysis in other scientific disciplines. As a comprehensive analytical perspective, SKAD has been applied in a number of empirical studies (on environmental conflicts, sex work, right-wing populist discourses, medical discourses, education, migration policy, not only within sociology but also in disciplines that extend beyond its borders (e.g., archaeology, education, Japanese studies, criminology, linguistics, political science). SKAD is well established within German-speaking discourse studies, though interest has recently been increasing in the English-speaking world and beyond.
