= Richard Grathoff =

Richard Helmut Grathoff (1934–2013) was a phenomenologist and Professor Emeritus in the Department of Sociology at Bielefeld University, Germany. Born on August 30, 1934, in Unna, Westphalia, Germany, he received his PhD from the New School for Social Research in 1969 after studying under Aron Gurwitsch, Thomas Luckmann and Peter L. Berger. Influenced by Charles Sanders Peirce, Edmund Husserl and Alfred Schutz, his work has included research in the topics of milieu and life-world ("Lebenswelt") and contemporary social theory. He died in Oerlinghausen, Germany on November 10, 2013.

== Major works ==
- The Structure of Social Inconsistencies (1970)
- Maurice Merleau-Ponty und das Problem der Struktur in den Sozialwissenschaften (coed.) (1976)
- The Theory of Social Action: The Correspondence of Alfred Schutz and Talcott Parsons (1978)
- Alfred Schutz und die Idee des Alltags in den Sozialwissenschaften (coed.) (1979)
- Sozialitat und Intersubjektivitat (coed.) (1983)
- Alfred Schutz und Aron Gurwitsch: Briefwechsel 1939-1959 (1985)
- Philosophers in Exile: The Correspondence of Alfred Schutz and Aron Gurwitsch (1989)
- Milieu und Lebenswelt (1989)
