= Maurice Natanson =

American philosopher (1924–1996)

- Born: Maurice Alexander Natanson; November 26, 1924; New York City, US
- Died: August 16, 1996 (aged 71); Santa Cruz, California, US
- Spouse: Lois Natanson

Education
- Education: Lincoln Memorial University; New York University; The New School
- Doctoral advisor: Alfred Schutz
- Other advisor: James Burnham

Philosophical work
- Era: 20th-century philosophy
- Region: Western philosophy
- School: Phenomenology
- Institutions: University of Houston; The New School; University of North Carolina; University of California, Santa Cruz; Yale University
- Doctoral students: Judith Butler; Lewis Gordon

Maurice Alexander Natanson (November 26, 1924 – August 16, 1996) was an American philosopher "who helped introduce the work of Jean-Paul Sartre and Edmund Husserl in the United States". He was a student of Alfred Schutz at The New School and helped popularize Schutz' work from the 1960s onward.

During his career he taught at the University of Houston, the Graduate Faculty of the New School for Social Research, the University of North Carolina, Yale University, the University of California, Santa Cruz where he helped establish the History of Consciousness graduate program. He was a visiting professor at the Pennsylvania State University and University of California, Berkeley.

Natanson delivered the inaugural Alfred Schutz Memorial Lecture, "Alfred Schutz: Philosopher and Social Scientist" (1995) and the Aron Gurwitsch Memorial Lecture "Illusion and Irreality" (1983) at the annual meetings of the Society for Phenomenology & the Human Sciences in 1995.

Natanson was born in Manhattan and raised in Brooklyn. He died from prostate cancer on August 16, 1996, at age 71.

== Works ==
Natanson was the author of numerous works including:

- A Critique of Jean-Paul Sartre's Ontology (1951)
- Literature, Philosophy and the Social Sciences (1962)
- The Journeying Self: A Study in Philosophy and Social Role (1970)
- Edmund Husserl: Philosopher of Infinite Tasks (1973)
- Phenomenology, Role and Reason (1974)
- Anonymity: A Study in the Philosophy of Alfred Schutz (1986)
- The Erotic Bird: Phenomenology in Literature, (1998) and editor of Essays in Phenomenology (1966)
- Phenomenology and the Social Sciences (volumes 1 and 2) (1973).

Natanson also edited The Problem of Social Reality, volume I of the collected papers of Alfred Schutz. The Husserl book won the National Book Award for Philosophy and Religion in 1974.

A Festschrift in honor of Natanson, The Prism of the Self, published in 1995 (edited by Steven Calt Crowell), includes contributions from Fred Kersten, Lester Embree, Lewis Gordon, Thomas Luckmann, Richard Zaner, Nobuo Kazashi, Michael McDuffie, Gail Weiss, and Judith Butler.
