= Phenomenology (sociology) =

Branch of sociology

Phenomenology within sociology (also social phenomenology or phenomenological sociology) examines the concept of social reality (German: Lebenswelt or "Lifeworld") as a product of intersubjectivity. Phenomenology analyses social reality in order to explain the formation and nature of social institutions. The application of phenomenological ideas in sociology, however, is not reduced to the notion of the "Lifeworld", nor to "grand" theoretical synthesis, such as that of phenomenological sociology.

== Context ==
Having developed the initial groundwork for philosophical phenomenology, Edmund Husserl set out to create a method for understanding the properties and structures of consciousness such as, emotions, perceptions of meaning, and aesthetic judgement.

Social phenomenologists talk about the social construction of reality. They view social order as a creation of everyday interaction, often looking at conversations to find the methods that people use to maintain social relations.

The leading exponent of Phenomenological Sociology was Alfred Schütz (1899–1959). Schütz sought to provide a critical philosophical foundation for Max Weber's interpretive sociology (verstehende Soziologie) by applying methods and insights derived from the philosophy of Husserl to the study of the social world. It is the building of this bridge between Husserlian phenomenology and Weberian sociology that serves as the starting point for contemporary phenomenological sociology.

Not all versions of phenomenological sociology are based on Weberian themes. There is some historical evidence that suggests elements of Weberian sociology are themselves based on certain phenomenological themes, especially in regard to the theory of the intended meaning of an act and ideas regarding theory and concept formation. Weber may have taken influence from Wilhelm Dilthey's theory of Weltanschauung, who may have also taken from Husserl's theory of meaning.

While Husserl's work was intended to understand how we reflect on the structures of consciousness in its own right, Schütz was concerned with the relationship between the Lebenswelt ("Lifeworld") and human action. Husserl's work was conducted as a transcendental phenomenology of consciousness. Schütz's work was conducted as a mundane phenomenology of the social world. Their projects differ in level of analysis, topics of study, and the type of phenomenological reduction used in analysis.

Ultimately these two distinct projects should be seen as complementary, with the studies of the latter dependent on the studies of the former. That is, valid phenomenological descriptions of the social reality should be consistent with the descriptions of intentional consciousness. It is from Husserl's work that Schütz' derives its meaning and verifiability. This is in keeping with Husserl's conception of phenomenology as "First Philosophy", the foundation, or ground, for both philosophy and all of the sciences.

== Core assumptions ==
Phenomenology takes it that social reality does not take place empirically or in any objective sense. Its various manifestations, such as institutions, organizations, social classes, and so on, are thought to be caused by lived social reality. In this way, these manifestations of social reality are considered "objects-constituted-in-and-for-consciousness". The process by which these manifestations come into being as products of consciousness is referred to in sociology as typification.

In Husserl's Ideas I, he defines a concept he calls "general thesis of the Natural Attitude" as "state of affairs in which we live before we have engaged in philosophy" or as the assumption that "the world is" as we literally perceive it in consciousness. The general thesis of the Natural Attitude is the ideational foundation for our everyday social experience. It unites the world of individual objects into a unified world of meaning, which we assume is shared by any and all who share our culture. The Natural Attitude forms the underpinning for our thoughts and actions. It is the mental projection of a belief that a naturally occurring social world is both factually objective in its existential status, and unquestioned in its "natural" appearance. According to the Natural Attitude, social objects (persons, language, institutions, etc.) have the same existential status as objects occurring in nature (rocks, trees, and animals, etc.).

Although it is often referred to as the "general thesis of the Natural Attitude", it is not a thesis in the formal sense of the term, but a non-thematic assumption, or belief, that underlies our sense of the objectivity and facticity of the world, and the objects appearing in this world. The facticity of this world of common sense is both unquestioned and virtually "unquestionable;" it is sanctionable as to its status as that which "is", and that which "everyone", or, at least, "any reasonable person", agrees to be the case with regard to the factual character of the world. As far as traditional social science is concerned, this taken-for-granted world of social facts is the starting and end point for any and all investigations of the social world. It provides the raw, observable, taken-for-granted "data" upon which the findings of the social sciences are idealized, conceptualized, and offered up for analysis and discourse. Within traditional social science, this "data" is formulated into a second order world of abstractions and idealizations constituted in accordance with these sciences' modelling schemes.

Schutz's phenomenological descriptions are made from within the Phenomenological Attitude, which follows the process of phenomenological reduction (epoché), which suspends the Natural Attitude and reveals the phenomena occurring within the Natural Attitude of the mind as manifestations of the non-objective mental world.

=== Stock of knowledge ===
The term "stock of knowledge" was coined by Schütz. This concept is vital to phenomenological sociologists and their claim that social reality is intersubjective. While phenomenologists tend to focus on establishing the structures of "intentional consciousness", as Husserl calls it, proponents of phenomenological sociology are interested in the structures of the "lifeworld". The latter refers to the world as directly experienced through the subjectivity of everyday life. As we go through our everyday lives, we draw on our stocks of knowledge to make interpretations. The "stock of knowledge" is typically a "deep background configuration" of a series of past experiences comprising: "one's native language and linguistic rules; conventional modes of interpreting expressions and events; numerous theories and methods; aural and visual forms; shared cultural and normative understandings, and the like." Schütz argued that all "interpretation of this world is based upon a stock of previous experiences of it."

== Reduction ==
Martin Heidegger characterizes Husserl's phenomenological research project as, "the analytic description of intentionality in its a priori;" as it is the phenomenon of intentionality which provides the mode of access for conducting any and all phenomenological investigations, and the ultimate ground or foundation guaranteeing any findings resulting from any such inquiry. In recognizing consciousness as having the formal structure of intentionality, as always having consciousness of an intended object, Husserlian phenomenology has located the access point to a radical new form of scientific description.

Methodologically, access to this field is obtained through the phenomenological reduction. While there is some controversy as to the official name, number, and levels of the reduction, this internal argument among the philosophers need not concern us. For the purposes of a mundane phenomenology of the social world, we, as phenomenological social scientists, engage in a mundane phenomenological reduction called the Epoché. The hallmark of this form of the reduction is what it reveals about its field of inquiry: a mundane phenomenology of the social world defines its phenomenal field as the intersubjective region of mundane consciousness as appearing from within the natural attitude.

The phenomenological reduction as applied to a mundane analysis of the social world consists of the bracketing [equivalents: methodical disregard, putting out of play, suspension] of the thesis of the natural attitude. This bracketing is nothing more than a bracketing of the existential belief in the existence of the objective world; the existential status of the world itself is not called into question. The result of this bracketing is that our attention is shifted from the objects in the world as they occur in nature, to the objects in the world as they appear for consciousness – as phenomenon for intentional consciousness. Our descriptions of objects in the world are now transformed from the naive descriptions of objects as occurring in nature, to phenomenological descriptions of objects as appearing for consciousness. In short, for the purpose of a mundane phenomenological analysis within the natural attitude, the epoche transforms objects as occurring in nature into: objects-for-subjectivity, objects-for-consciousness, objects-as-intended.

Keep in mind that for positivism, the meaning of an object is, by definition, "objective". That is, the meaning of the object is a property of the object itself, is independent of any particular observer, and "the same" for any and all observers regardless of their orientation or perspective. For phenomenology, an object is always intended, and constituted, as meaningful by a particular intending subject from a particular orientation and from a particular perspectival viewing point. In addition, phenomenologically speaking, the meaning of the object cannot be separated from its phenomenality, or materiality, and cannot be constituted qua meaningful object without the meaning bestowing act of intending on the part of a constituting subject.

For a phenomenology undertaken within the natural attitude, meaning does not inherently accrue to an object as a thing-in-itself, is not an "add-on" to the object (a label), and is not separable from the object as constituted by the intending subject in the act of meaning constitution. For phenomenology, the meaning and the object (in its "materiality") are co-constituted in the intending of the object by the subject—phenomenologically speaking there are only meaningful objects. There is no such thing as a neutrally valued object, or a meaningless object, and the notion of an object as "nonsense" is itself a meaningful determination – as the existentialists would say, we are condemned to meaning.

Note that, because we as observers have already been born into an already-existing social world that is already pre-interpreted – through both social meanings and through architectural and business intentionality – and 'made meaningful-to-us' as an intersubjectively available "entity", any proposal that the subject is creating the object, or creating the meaning of the object as an individual achievement in a particular situation is a misrepresentation of what is actually taking place. Within the 'Natural Attitude of Everyday Life', the subject's role in the constitution of meaningful objects is better understood as a reading off, or interpretation, of the meaning from the object-as-intended. This reading off, or interpretation, of the object's meaning is an intersubjective achievement of the intending subject that takes place within the intersubjective realm of the natural attitude.

== See also ==
- Bracketing (phenomenology)
- Collective intentionality
- Conversation analysis
- Ethnomethodology
- Hermeneutics
- Noema
- Social ontology
- Social philosophy

== Bibliography ==
Barber, Michael D. "Alfred Schutz," Stanford Encyclopedia of Philosophy. Web. — Touches on the phenomenological sociology.
Bird, Gregory. 2009. "What is Phenomenological Sociology Again?" Human Studies: A Journal for Philosophy and the Social Sciences, 32, 419-439.
Natanson, Maurice, and Edmund Husserl. 1974. Philosopher of Infinite Tasks. Evanston, IL: Northwestern University Press. Paperback. — Provides sociologists with an introduction to phenomenology.
Schutz, Alfred. 1967. The Phenomenology of the Social World. Evanston, IL: Northwestern University Press. Paperback. — Touches on the phenomenological method.
Smith, Davis Woodruff. "Phenomenology," Stanford Encyclopedia of Philosophy. Web. — Provides an introduction to phenomenology.
Sokolowski, Robert. 2000. Introduction to Phenomenology. New York: Cambridge University Press. Paperback. — Touches on the phenomenological method.
Wender, Jonathan. 2001. “Phenomenology, Cultural Criminology and the Return to Astonishment.” Pp. 49–60 in Cultural Criminology Unleashed, edited by J. Ferrell, K. Hayward, W. Morrison, and M. Presdee. London: Routledge.
Zaner, R. M. 2010. "Editorial Introduction." Pp. xv–xxxv in The Collected Works of Aron Gurwitsch, V.III. New York: Springer. — Touches on the phenomenological method.
