= Social construct =

Concept made real by collective agreement

A social construct is any category or thing that is made real by convention or collective agreement. Socially constructed realities are contrasted with natural kinds, which exist independently of human behavior or beliefs.

Simple examples of social constructs are the meaning of words, the value of paper money, and the rules of economic systems. Other examples, such as race, were formerly considered controversial but are now accepted by the consensus of scientists to be socially constructed rather than naturally determined. Still other possible examples, such as less empirical and more abstract concepts which underlie particular scientific theories, remain the subject of ongoing philosophical debate.

== Relationship with objectivity ==
During the 20th century, philosopher John Searle and sociologists Peter Berger and Thomas Luckmann argued that some socially constructed realities—such as property ownership, citizenship, and marital status—should be considered forms of objective fact, and posited the existence of such socially constructed objective facts as a philosophical or methodological problem to be explored.

Others, such as György Lukács, Theodor Adorno and Max Horkheimer built upon the ideas of Friedrich Nietzsche and Karl Marx to argue that a fallacy of reification is responsible for the practice of treating socially constructed facts as though they were natural—a phenomenon Lukács referred to as "phantom objectivity".

More recently, biological anthropologists and public health experts have determined that, while race is a social construct, the persistence of racism has objectively demonstrable negative consequences for the health and well-being of marginalized groups.
