= The Social Construction of Reality =

1966 book by Peter L. Berger and Thomas Luckmann

The Social Construction of Reality: A Treatise in the Sociology of Knowledge
- Cover of the first edition
- Authors: Peter L. Berger; Thomas Luckmann
- Language: English
- Subject: Sociology of knowledge
- Publisher: Anchor Books
- Publication date: 1966
- Publication place: United States
- Media type: Print (hardcover · paperback)
- Pages: 240
- ISBN: 978-0-385-05898-8
- Dewey Decimal: 306.4/2 20
- LC Class: BD175 .B4 1990

The Social Construction of Reality: A Treatise in the Sociology of Knowledge (1966), by Peter L. Berger and Thomas Luckmann, proposes that social groups and individuals who interact with each other, within a system of social classes, over time create concepts (mental representations) of the actions of each other, and that people become habituated to those concepts, and thus assume reciprocal social roles. When those social roles are available for other members of society to assume and portray, their reciprocal, social interactions are said to be institutionalized behaviours. In that process of the social construction of reality, the meaning of the social role is embedded to society as cultural knowledge.

As a work about the sociology of knowledge, influenced by the work of Alfred Schütz, The Social Construction of Reality introduced the term social construction and influenced the establishment of the field of social constructionism. In 1998, the International Sociological Association listed The Social Construction of Reality as the fifth most-important book of 20th-century sociology.

== Concepts ==
=== Social stock of knowledge ===
Earlier theories (those of, for example, Max Scheler, Karl Mannheim, Werner Stark, Karl Marx, and Max Weber) often focused predominantly on scientific and theoretical knowledge, representing a limited sphere of social knowledge. Customs, common interpretations, institutions, shared routines, habitualizations, the who-is-who and who-does-what in social processes and the division of labor, constitute a much larger part of knowledge in society.

“…theoretical knowledge is only a small and by no means the most important part of what passed for knowledge in a society… the primary knowledge about the institutional order is knowledge… is the sum total of ‘what everybody knows’ about a social world, an assemblage of maxims, morals, proverbial nuggets of wisdom, values and beliefs, myths, and so forth” (p. 65)

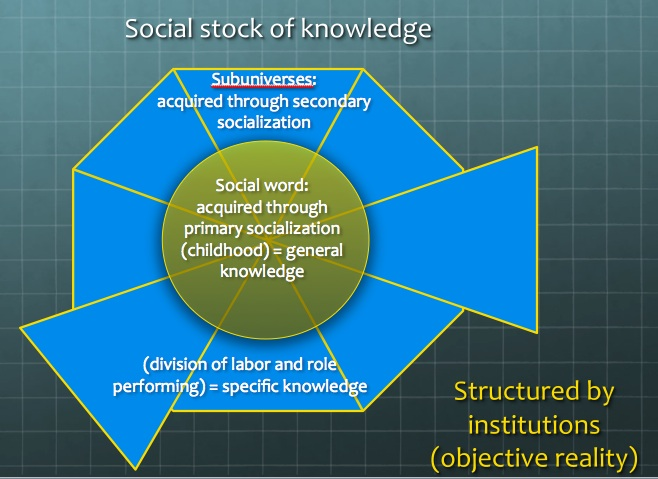

=== Semantic fields ===
The general body of knowledge is socially distributed, and classified in semantic fields. The dynamic distribution and inter dependencies of these knowledge sectors provide structure to the social stock of knowledge:

“The social stock of knowledge differentiates reality by degrees of familiarity… my knowledge of my own occupation and its world is very rich and specific, while I have only very sketchy knowledge of the occupational worlds of others” (p. 43) “The social distribution of knowledge thus begins with the simple fact that I do not know everything known to my fellowmen, and vice versa, and culminates in exceedingly complex and esoteric systems of expertise. Knowledge of how the socially available stock of knowledge is distributed, at least in outline, is an important element of that same stock of knowledge.” (p. 46)

=== Language and signs ===
Language also plays an important role in the analysis of integration of everyday reality. Language links up commonsense knowledge with finite provinces of meaning, thus enabling people, for example, to interpret dreams through understandings relevant in the daytime. "Language is capable of transcending the reality of everyday life altogether. It can refer to experiences pertaining to finite provinces of meaning, it can span discrete spheres of reality...Language soars into regions that are not only de facto but also a priori unavailable to everyday experience."p. 40. Regarding the function of language and signs, Berger and Luckmann are indebted to George Herbert Mead and other figures in the field known as symbolic interactionism, as acknowledged in their Introduction, especially regarding the possibility of constructing objectivity.

Signs and language provide interoperability for the construction of everyday reality:

“A sign [has the] explicit intention to serve as an index of subjective meanings … Language is capable of becoming the objective repository of vast accumulations of meaning and experience, which it can then preserve in time and transmit to following generations… Language also typifies experiences, allowing me to subsume them under broad categories in terms of which they have meaning not only to myself but also to my fellowmen” (p. 35-39)

=== Social everyday reality ===
Social everyday reality is characterized by Intersubjectivity (which refers to the coexistence of multiple realities in this context) (p. 23-25):

“Compared to the reality of everyday life, other realities appear as finite provinces of meaning, enclaves within the paramount reality marked by circumscribed meanings and modes of experience” (p. 25)

This is in contrast to other realities, such as dreams, theoretical constructs, religious or mystic beliefs, artistic and imaginary worlds, etc. While individuals may visit other realities (such as watching a film), they are always brought back to everyday reality (once the film ends) (p. 25).

Individuals have the capacity to reflect on these realities, including their own social everyday reality. This type of reflection is often referred to as reflexivity. But, crucially, even reflexivity must draw on some "source material" or be rooted in intersubjectivity. It has, thus, been suggested that: "As agents exercise their reflexive capacities, they bring with them a past consisting of social experiences accumulated or sedimented into stocks of knowledge that provide the requisite guidance for going about their lives and interpreting their social reality".

== Society as objective reality ==
=== Institutionalization ===
Institutionalization of social processes grows out of the habitualization and customs, gained through mutual observation with subsequent mutual agreement on the “way of doing things”. This reduces uncertainty and danger and allows our limited attention span to focus on more things at the same time, while institutionalized routines can be expected to continue “as previously agreed”:

“Habitualization carries with it the important psychological gain that choices are narrowed… the background of habitualized activity opens up a foreground for deliberation and innovation [which demand a higher level of attention]… The most important gain is that each [member of society] will be able to predict the other's actions. Concomitantly, the interaction of both becomes predictable… Many actions are possible on a low level of attention. Each action of one is no longer a source of astonishment and potential danger to the other“ (p. 53-57).

=== Social objective worlds ===
Social (or institutional) objective worlds are one consequence of institutionalization, and are created when institutions are passed on to a new generation. This creates a reality that is vulnerable to the ideas of a minority which will then form the basis of social expectations in the future. The underlying reasoning is fully transparent to the creators of an institution, as they can reconstruct the circumstances under which they made agreements; while the second generation inherits it as something “given”, “unalterable” and “self-evident” and they might not understand the underlying logic.

“…a social world [is] a comprehensive and given reality confronting the individual in a manner analogous to the reality of the natural world… In early phases of socialization the child is quite incapable of distinguishing between the objectivity of natural phenomena and the objectivity of the social formations… The objective reality of institutions is not diminished if the individual does not understand their purpose or their mode of operation… He must ‘go out’ and learn about them, just as he must learn about nature… (p.59-61)

=== Division of labor ===
Division of labor is another consequence of institutionalization. Institutions assign “roles” to be performed by various actors, through typification of performances, such as “father-role”, “teacher-role”, “hunter”, “cook”, etc. As specialization increases in number as well as in size and sophistication, a civilization's culture contains more and more sections of knowledge specific to given roles or tasks, sections which become more and more esoteric to non-specialists. These areas of knowledge do not belong anymore to the common social world and culture.

“A society's stock of knowledge is structured in terms of what is generally relevant and what is relevant only to specific roles… the social distribution of knowledge entails a dichotomization in terms of general and role-specific relevance… because of the division of labor, role-specific knowledge will grow at a faster rate than generally relevant and accessible knowledge… The increasing number and complexity of [the resulting] sub universes [of specialized knowledge] make them increasingly inaccessible to outsiders (p. 77-87)

=== Symbolic universes ===
Symbolic universes are created to provide legitimation to the created institutional structure. Symbolic universes are a set of beliefs “everybody knows” that aim at making the institutionalized structure plausible and acceptable for the individual—who might otherwise not understand or agree with the underlying logic of the institution. As an ideological system, the symbolic universe “puts everything in its right place”. It provides explanations for why we do things the way we do. Proverbs, moral maxims, wise sayings, mythology, religions and other theological thought, metaphysical traditions and other value systems are part of the symbolic universe. They are all (more or less sophisticated) ways to legitimize established institutions.

“The function of legitimation is to make objectively available and subjectively plausible the ‘first-order’ objectivations that have been institutionalized… Proverbs, moral maxims and wise sayings are common on this level… [as well as] explicit theories… symbolic processes… a general theory of the cosmos and a general theory of man… The symbolic universe also orders history. It locates all collective events in a cohesive unity that includes past, present and future.” (p. 110-120)

=== Universe-maintenance ===
Universe-maintenance refers to specific procedures undertaken, often by an elite group, when the symbolic universe does not fulfill its purpose anymore, which is to legitimize the institutional structure in place. This happens, for example, in generational shifts, or when deviants create an internal movement against established institutions (e.g. against revolutions), or when a society is confronted with another society with a greatly different history and institutional structures. In primitive societies this happened through mythological systems, later on through theological thought. Today, an extremely complex set of science has secularized universe-maintenance.

“Specific procedures of universe-maintenance become necessary when the symbolic universe has become a problem. As long as this is not the case, the symbolic universe is self-maintaining, that is self-legitimating. An intrinsic problem presents itself with the process of transmission of the symbolic universe from one generation to another… [additionally] two societies confronting each other with conflicting universes will both develop conceptual machinery designed to maintain their respective universes… mythology represents the most archaic form of universe-maintenance… theological thought may be distinguished from its mythological predecessor simply in terms of its greater degree of theoretical systematization… Modern science is an extreme step in this development. (p. 104-116)

== Society as subjective reality ==
=== Socialization ===
Socialization is a two-step induction of the individual to participate in the social institutional structure, meaning in its objective reality.

"The individual… is not born a member of society. He… becomes a member of society. In the life of every individual… there is a temporal sequence, in the course of which he is inducted into participation in the social dialectic" (p. 149) “By ‘successful socialization’ we mean the establishment of a high degree of symmetry between objective and subjective reality” (p. 163)

Primary Socialization takes place as a child. It is highly charged emotionally and is not questioned. Secondary Socialization includes the acquisition of role-specific knowledge, thus taking one's place in the social division of labor. It is learned through training and specific rituals, and is not emotionally charged: “it is necessary to love one's mother, but not one's teacher”. Training for secondary socialization can be very complex and depends on the complexity of division of labor in a society. Primary socialization is much less flexible than secondary socialization. E.g. shame for nudity comes from primary socialization, adequate dress code depends on secondary: A relatively minor shift in the subjective definition of reality would suffice for an individual to take for granted that one may go to the office without a tie. A much more drastic shift would be necessary to have him go, as a matter of course, without any clothes at all.

“The child does not internalize the world of his significant others as one of many possible worlds… It is for this reason that the world internalized in primary socialization is so much more firmly entrenched in consciousness than worlds internalized in secondary socialization…. Secondary socialization is the internalization of institutional or institution-based ‘sub worlds’… The roles of secondary socialization carry a high degree of anonymity… The same knowledge taught by one teacher could also be taught by another… The institutional distribution of tasks between primary and secondary socialization varies with the complexity of the social distribution of knowledge” (p. 129-147)

=== Conversation ===
Conversation or verbal communication aims at reality-maintenance of the subjective reality. What seems to be a useless and unnecessary communication of redundant banalities is actually a constant mutual reconfirmation of each other's internal thoughts, in that it maintains subjective reality.

“One may view the individual's everyday life in terms of the working away of a conversational apparatus that ongoingly maintains, modifies and reconstructs his subjective reality… [for example] ‘Well, it's time for me to get to the station,’ and ‘Fine, darling, have a good day at the office’ implies an entire world within which these apparently simple propositions make sense… the exchange confirms the subjective reality of this world… the great part, if not all, of everyday conversation maintains subjective reality… imagine the effect…of an exchange like this: ‘Well, it's time for me to get to the station,’ ‘Fine, darling, don't forget to take along your gun.’ (p. 147-163)

=== Identity ===
Identity of an individual is subject to a struggle of affiliation to sometimes conflicting realities. For example, the reality from primary socialization (mother tells child not to steal) can be in contrast with second socialization (gang members teach teenager that stealing is cool). Our final social location in the institutional structure of society will ultimately also influence our body and organism.

“…life-expectancies of lower-class and upper-class [vary] …society determines how long and in what manner the individual organism shall live… Society also directly penetrates the organism in its functioning, most importantly in respect to sexuality and nutrition. While both sexuality and nutrition are grounded in biological drives… biological constitution does not tell him where he should seek sexual release and what he should eat.” (p. 163-183)

== Reception ==
In 1998 the International Sociological Association listed it as the fifth-most important sociological book of the 20th century, behind Max Weber's The Protestant Ethic and the Spirit of Capitalism (1905) but ahead of Pierre Bourdieu's Distinction (1979).

== Influence ==
The Social Construction of Reality (SCR) is referenced by a very broad range of fields including law, social medicine, philosophy, political science, economics, management and gender studies. The book was influential in the creation of the field of social constructionism which has developed many subfields, though the concept of constructionism had entered sociology prior to the publication of SCR. Piaget used the term in his 1950 book, La construction du réel chez l’enfant. Scholars of social constructionism drew parallels between social constructionism and various post-structuralism and postmodern fields making these theories synonymous with the ideas presented in SCR, though these books did not reference SCR directly. However, the term social constructionism is used quite broadly; some uses are unrelated to the theory laid out in SCR, and the further a field is from sociology the less likely it is to cite SCR when discussing constructionism.

== See also ==
- Dramaturgy (sociology) – Sociological perspective
- Reality tunnel – Theory of personal perception
