= Social constructionism =

Sociological theory regarding shared understandings

"Social constructionism" is a term used in sociology, social ontology, and communication theory. The term can serve somewhat different functions in each field; however, the foundation of this theoretical framework suggests various facets of social reality—such as concepts, beliefs, norms and values—are formed through continuous interactions and negotiations among society's members, rather than empirical observation of physical reality. The theory of social constructionism posits that much of what individuals perceive as "reality" is the outcome of a dynamic process of construction influenced by social conventions and structures.

Unlike phenomena that are innately determined or biologically predetermined, these social constructs are collectively formulated, sustained, and shaped by the social contexts in which they exist. These constructs significantly impact both the behavior and perceptions of individuals, often being internalized based on cultural narratives, whether or not these are empirically verifiable. In this two-way process of reality construction, individuals not only interpret and assimilate information through their social relations but also contribute to shaping existing societal narratives.

Examples of phenomena that are often viewed as social constructs range widely, encompassing the assigned value of money, conceptions of self, beauty standards, gender, language, race, ethnicity, social class, social hierarchy, nationality, religion, social norms, the modern calendar and other units of time, marriage, education, citizenship, stereotypes, femininity and masculinity, social institutions and even the idea of 'social construct' itself.

== Overview ==
A social construct or construction is the meaning, notion, or connotation placed on an object or event by a society, and adopted by that society with respect to how they view or deal with the object or event.

The social construction of target populations refers to the cultural characterizations or popular images of the persons or groups whose behavior and well-being are affected by public policy.

Social constructionism posits that the meanings of phenomena do not have an independent foundation outside the mental and linguistic representation that people develop about them throughout their history, and which becomes their shared reality. From a linguistic viewpoint, social constructionism centers meaning as an internal reference within language (words refer to words, definitions to other definitions) rather than to an external reality.

== Origins ==
Each person creates their own "constructed reality" that drives their behaviors

Social constructionism has been rooted in "symbolic interactionism" and "phenomenology." With Berger and Luckmann's The Social Construction of Reality published in 1966, this concept found its hold. More than four decades later, much theory and research pledged itself to the basic tenet that people "make their social and cultural worlds at the same time these worlds make them." It is a viewpoint that uproots social processes "simultaneously playful and serious, by which reality is both revealed and concealed, created and destroyed by our activities." It provides a substitute for the "Western intellectual tradition" where the researcher "earnestly seeks certainty in a representation of reality by means of propositions."

In social constructionist terms, "taken-for-granted realities" are cultivated from "interactions between and among social agents"; furthermore, reality is not some objective truth "waiting to be uncovered through positivist scientific inquiry." Rather, there can be "multiple realities that compete for truth and legitimacy." Social constructionism understands the "fundamental role of language and communication" and this understanding has "contributed to the linguistic turn" and, more recently, the "turn to discourse theory." The majority of social constructionists abide by the belief that "language does not mirror reality; rather, it constitutes [creates] it."

A broad definition of social constructionism has its supporters and critics in the organizational sciences. A constructionist approach to various organizational and managerial phenomena appears to be more commonplace and on the rise.

Andy Lock and Tom Strong trace some of the fundamental tenets of social constructionism back to the work of the 18th-century Italian political philosopher, rhetorician, historian, and jurist Giambattista Vico.

Berger and Luckmann give credit to Max Scheler as a major influence, as he created the idea of sociology of knowledge which influenced social construction theory.

According to Lock and Strong, other influential thinkers whose work has affected the development of social constructionism are: Edmund Husserl, Alfred Schutz, Maurice Merleau-Ponty, Martin Heidegger, Hans-Georg Gadamer, Paul Ricoeur, Jürgen Habermas, Emmanuel Levinas, Mikhail Bakhtin, Valentin Volosinov, Lev Vygotsky, George Herbert Mead, Ludwig Wittgenstein, Gregory Bateson, Harold Garfinkel, Erving Goffman, Anthony Giddens, Michel Foucault, Ken Gergen, Mary Gergen, Rom Harre and John Shotter.

== Applications ==
=== Personal construct psychology ===
Since its appearance in the 1950s, personal construct psychology (PCP) has mainly developed as a constructivist theory of personality and a system of transforming individual meaning-making processes, largely in therapeutic contexts. It was based around the notion of persons as scientists who form and test theories about their worlds. Therefore, it represented one of the first attempts to appreciate the constructive nature of experience and the meaning persons give to their experience. Social constructionism (SC), on the other hand, mainly developed as a form of a critique, aimed to transform the oppressing effects of the social meaning-making processes. Over the years, it has grown into a cluster of different approaches, with no single SC position. However, different approaches under the generic term of SC are loosely linked by some shared assumptions about language, knowledge, and reality.

A usual way of thinking about the relationship between PCP and SC is treating them as two separate entities that are similar in some aspects, but also very different in others. This way of conceptualizing this relationship is a logical result of the circumstantial differences of their emergence. In subsequent analyses these differences between PCP and SC were framed around several points of tension, formulated as binary oppositions: personal/social; individualist/relational; agency/structure; constructivist/constructionist. Although some of the most important issues in contemporary psychology are elaborated in these contributions, the polarized positioning also sustained the idea of a separation between PCP and SC, paving the way for only limited opportunities for dialogue between them.

Reframing the relationship between PCP and SC may be of use in both the PCP and the SC communities. On one hand, it extends and enriches SC theory and points to benefits of applying the PCP "toolkit" in constructionist therapy and research. On the other hand, the reframing contributes to PCP theory and points to new ways of addressing social construction in therapeutic conversations.

=== Educational psychology ===
Like social constructionism, social constructivism states that people work together to construct artifacts. While social constructionism focuses on the artifacts that are created through the social interactions of a group, social constructivism focuses on an individual's learning that takes place because of his or her interactions in a group.

Social constructivism has been studied by many educational psychologists, who are concerned with its implications for teaching and learning. For more on the psychological dimensions of social constructivism, see the work of Lev Vygotsky, Ernst von Glasersfeld and A. Sullivan Palincsar.

=== Systemic therapy ===
Some of the systemic models that use social constructionism include narrative therapy and solution-focused therapy.

=== Poverty ===
Max Rose and Frank R. Baumgartner (2013), in Framing the Poor: Media Coverage and U.S. Poverty Policy, 1960-2008, examine how the media has framed the poor in the U.S. and how negative framing has caused a shift in government spending. Between 1960 and 2008, U.S. government spending on programs benefiting low-income people increased. However, nonmedical anti-poverty assistance became less generous relative to need after reaching a peak in the early 1970s. The authors associated this trend with increasingly negative media portrayals of the poor, particularly depictions emphasizing laziness, dependency, and fraud. Evidence shows the media framing the poor more negatively since 1960, with more usage of words such as lazy and fraud.

=== Crime ===
Potter and Kappeler (1996), in their introduction to Constructing Crime: Perspective on Making News And Social Problems wrote, "Public opinion and crime facts demonstrate no congruence. The reality of crime in the United States has been subverted to a constructed reality as ephemeral as swamp gas."

Criminology has long focused on why and how society defines criminal behavior and crime in general. While looking at crime through a social constructionism lens, there is evidence to support that criminal acts are a social construct where abnormal or deviant acts become a crime based on the views of society. Another explanation of crime as it relates to social constructionism are individual identity constructs that result in deviant behavior. If someone has constructed the identity of a "madman" or "criminal" for themselves based on a society's definition, it may force them to follow that label, resulting in criminal behavior.

=== Gender and roles ===
When it comes to gender and societal roles, there are many different beliefs about what the norms are. There are multiple perceptions and societal views of what men should be and what women should be, specifically, how they act or what roles they should play. Martin talks about intersectionality and how the term was created to gender is a social construction that is influenced by social factors and experiences. She goes on to say that gender is linked with experiences that shape someone's life, such as harmful experiences that women endure. She is saying that each gender experiences different things, and the diversity in experiences and life situations is what makes the genders separate and different. In another article, Pereira and Chahini go on to say that society determines the rules of what a man and woman should be, and they assign certain values and roles to each gender. Society dictates how a man and woman should act and the norms associated with them.

On the topic of gender roles in the workplace, Bannò, D'Allura, Coller and Varum found that society seems to think of women as having less status and not having the ability to achieve goals or tasks that are important to the workplace, when compared to men. In this article, they talked about the role of being a manager in a business or firm, and how there are stereotypes of men's and women's roles in the workplace. This stereotype is fueled by the inherent characteristics of men and women and how those characteristics would be received by their fellow employees. It doesn't help that Bannò, D'Allura, Coller and Varum talk about self-fulfilling prophecies for women, and how, because people assume that women will act a certain way, it will usually come to fruition because mostly everyone, including both men and women, will think it is true, and therefore create a constructed reality. Additionally, they said that the way men and women think and behave comes from the experiences involving gender and sex roles that they had as children. If an individual is raised and told that they can only participate in and do certain things because there are specific roles for genders, they will become conditioned and only do the roles they think are a societal norm.

In today's day and age, the perception of masculinity has changed. Different generations have different beliefs and perceptions of what masculinity is and should be. Masculinity includes how men act, communicate, interact with others, and the tasks they are assigned. This has trickled into the advertising industry, as different companies advertise and show off what they think masculinity is. According to a study done by Kreicbergs and Sceulovs, consumers appreciate it when business advertisements display a version of masculinity that fits their own personal beliefs and values. Consumers typically won't associate or buy from a company that has different beliefs from them, specifically if they launch advertisements that convey messages that go against consumer beliefs of identity or masculinity. Kreicbergs and Sceulovs claimed that masculinity is socially constructed due to the interactions that we have with one another, as a society. In today's society, masculinity has changed due to new encounters and interactions with each gender, which changes perceptions and norms of how each gender should act.

=== Emotion ===
The social construction of emotions is an interesting topic. Emotions are developed and discovered through interactions, especially at a young age. When people are in the early stages of their childhood, they are taught what emotions are and the positives and negatives of each emotion. Depending on the social environment and the people you are around, you will come to find which emotions are good or bad to have, specifically the social norms associated with each emotion. According to the research done by Collardeau, Dupuis and Woodin, based on an individual's relationships with others, as a child, they can see how people will respond to different emotional situations. They studied how early childhood relationships lead them to internalize cultural norms and values, the meanings of emotions, and the norms associated with each emotion. How people interpret the meanings of emotions and norms is based on how they were taught through relationship interactions. Collardeau, Dupuis and Woodin were able to study how a person becomes good and the acts associated with that, through social norms that they developed.

We know that you can develop social norms and emotions from interactions with other individuals, but you can also develop emotions and changes in ideas. Mesa-Pedrazas, Torrado and Duque-Calvache claim that shared ideas and experiences can influence where people will live. Being in the same spaces repeatedly can cause individuals to develop emotions and memories of that place. Based on where someone lives, they can develop changes in ideas and habits, such as fashion changes and ways of doing things. Living spaces can help shape a person's life and how they perceive society.

=== Effects on childhood development and direction ===
Childhood is an important stage of human development. Most of the beliefs, standards, and norms are developed when people are in the early stages of development. Zhaofan says that childhood isn't a developmental stage, at least it's not an established or permanent stage of development. He views childhood as a form of social construction. Zhaofan states that if we were to view childhood as the main focus of this topic, the experiences of each generation's childhood can become an important part of society's social structure and help form new norms or perceptions. Children can form and define their own social lives through their experiences and interactions with others.

Along with childhood development, there is childhood direction, or the factors that influence children's actions and social direction. Most kids are dependent on their parents or other role models for direction in life. They are young and new to the world, and they don't know how society works or what their place is in it. Nash says that a child's reality is constructed from the moment they are born. It is formed and influenced by their parents or guardians through actions and other forms of communication. She says that when parents restrict the use of technology, it takes away from the self-direction that children would have. She says that the main issue is that when children are restricted, it prevents them from creating or developing their own ideas and solutions to issues that may arise. It is important for children to think for themselves because they are new to society and they are curious beings. They are creative, and allowing them to construct their own ideas is a sense of freedom that every child should have.

=== Digital technology and human–machine communication ===
Technologies' influence on individuals' ideas and beliefs is huge. Especially in today's day and age, the influence of technology on individuals is getting more and more significant every day. Schools are using technology to help educate students, and the younger generation is constantly using social media. Kids are being raised on technology, and that is having a major impact on their learning habits and norm development. They aren't getting the chance to think for themselves because they are constantly looking at information online. Chown and Nascimento claimed that technology and society are in a two-way relationship that is constantly in sync with one another. We interpret different meanings of technology and what we read online, and that changes the way people live. Digital technologies are a form of artifacts that consume meanings from social cultures and, in some ways, come up with their own interpretation of it. Technology creates and uses metaphors to describe different situations and norms. In turn, this can affect an individual's personal relationships, how they communicate, what they believe in, and their knowledge.

Another aspect of technological influence on individuals and the social construction of beliefs and norms is the relationship between humans and machines or AI. Hepp, Bolin, Guzman, and Loosen did a study, and they found that media and technology give character to cultural environments. Devices that are the main sources of technology and media influence individuals to develop and assign social meanings to AI when they interact with it. Many individuals in the younger generations, who are curious, often have conversations with AI to see what it thinks about different topics and beliefs. This especially happens when people are lonely because AI instantly responds and gives them an immediate, lengthy answer. They have to interpret the meanings of what the AI robot is saying because it isn't always clear due to the non-human factors. Digital technology and media are woven into almost every aspect of society and that makes it hard for it not to influence your beliefs, norms or values.

=== Constructing knowledge and learning ===
Gaining knowledge and furthering learning are key aspects involved in social constructionism. Individuals gain new knowledge when they interact with others, such as peers. According to Matuk and Linn, reading ideas from peers can encourage individuals to compare and contrast multiple points of view and help them notice inconsistencies and holes in their own understanding. Using websites to view ideas from peers can help improve people's own ideas as they build a better understanding of various topics. Reading new ideas from peers allows individuals to create new interests, which would create learning. Collaborating with peers helps people to gain a new perspective and think about ideas that they have never thought about before.

When it comes to scientific knowledge, especially new knowledge, it is often debated whether or not the facts are truthful or bogus. Scientists try and challenge other scientists' claims in order to be right and be seen as responsible for the next big scientific discovery. The SSK (the sociology of scientific knowledge) states that the production of scientific knowledge is a "social process". Scientists come up with claims that they claim are facts, and they try to prove them to their colleagues and the public. Social constructionism affects how scientists create claims because they are influenced by many factors, such as government groups, schools, and the competition of other scientists. These factors pressure them to come up with claims quickly, so they can please others and say that they have an answer. In the article, Yuichiro Amekawa says that scientific claims are "social artifacts" that are created through the influence of groups. This is shown in Amekawa's article, which discusses Japan's radioactive disposal policy. Scientists in Japan are trying to convince the public that the radioactive waste isn't harmful and that it is nothing to worry about. The scientists are under government control, and they are socially constructing knowledge in order not to make a big deal about having a proper disposal site.

Life skills are a learned thing. Individuals develop life skills through experiences throughout their lives. Depending on the environment they are in, or the social environment, people can develop good or bad life skills. Skills are gained through experiences because individuals learn from and reflect on almost every experience they have. It is the meaning that is created from each experience that creates learning and life skills. This is a major problem in the Maldives. According to Nasheeda, Krauss, Abdullah and Ahmad the uneven population of the islands has caused massive amounts of unemployment, crime, violence, and a lack of a good education system for the younger population. People in the Maldives can't gain good life skills if they are constantly around violence and have no access to a good education or a job. Nasheeda, Krauss, Abdullah and Ahmad stated that individuals gain life skills from interactions and imitations of others. They are socially constructing bad life skills due to the environment they are in.

Soft skills are created through social constructionism. These are the skills that are based on your personal characteristics, and they are used when communicating with others. These are mostly used in and around the workplace because they are needed when working with groups. According to Atilla-Bal and Okay-Somerville, soft skills are constructed through experiences in the workplace and the expectations that upper management has for its employees. The younger generation's perceptions of soft skills are developed from their experiences in family engagements and educational activities. Soft skills can be developed based on an individual's personality traits, but it is mainly how they were taught and the experiences they have worked through.

=== Cultural differences ===
==== Senegal ====
Each culture has different ideas of social norms and its own way of constructing norms. In one culture, it may be normal to do one thing, but in another culture, it may be forbidden to do. Falcão has a great way of explaining this. He studies the socially constructed practice of silence in Senegal. Silence is seen as a "code" in Senegal, and it is expected to be followed so that social peace is maintained. Social peace is maintained by suppressing discussion that can lead to social conflicts. It is seen as a cultural norm for the people of Senegal to be silent on conflicting matters. They don't see it as oppression; instead, they see it as a collective norm that helps diffuse tension as it arises. If members of their society were to voice their grievances or complaints, it would be seen as disruptive, and they would be urged to be silent because that is considered "ethically superior" to them.

==== Caste systems in Indian culture ====
Another cultural difference is found in Indian culture, specifically the caste system in Indian culture. Deshmukh, Sharma, Prasad, Dey, and Rai describe the caste system as a socially constructed event formed by interactions, norms, and cultural ideologies. It basically dictates an individual's place in a cultural society, and it is a way to maintain social hierarchy. This has a major effect on the social life and experiences of individuals, which in turn would cause them to socially construct norms that differ from those on different levels of the caste system.

=== Business and ethics ===
It is known that there are many conflicts in the business world and that the way a business handles conflict and moral restoration is important to the outcome of socially constructed views and beliefs. Conflicts in business happen every day, but the important thing is how they are handled and how each party involved is affected. Vives-Gabriel, Wim and Wettstein studied many cases of corporate conflicts, and they found that moral repair is important when dealing with these issues. During the evaluations of corporate conflicts and moral repair, it is discussed how much dignity or moral value each victim has or is worthy of. The parties involved communicate to find out the worthiness of each victim, and they collectively create a meaning of what each person is and the situation at hand.

Social behavior is influenced by how an individual is treated. If they are treated kindly and with respect, odds are they will treat others the exact same way. Li, Zhu, Liu & Yuan studied the correlation between students who receive financial aid from colleges and universities and how many of them give back to the school in return, once they are older. This mostly included giving money to the school scholarship fund, so that future students can get financial aid and feel the same way that the donor did at one point in time. They said that an individual's social values would become clearer to them, and it would influence how they would act towards others. Students would interpret the financial aid as a sign that, as a society, everyone should help each other out and give to others when they can. It would feel like a social obligation to serve the community and help others so that they could develop good, socially constructed norms and values. This would make the individuals feel as if they are an important part of society, and that would help them believe that they have the power to influence others.

== History and development ==
=== Berger and Luckmann ===
Constructionism became prominent in the United States with Peter L. Berger and Thomas Luckmann's 1966 book, The Social Construction of Reality. Berger and Luckmann argue that all knowledge, including the most basic, taken-for-granted common-sense knowledge of everyday reality, is derived from and maintained by social interactions. In their model, people interact on the understanding that their perceptions of everyday life are shared with others, and this common knowledge of reality is in turn reinforced by these interactions. Since this common-sense knowledge is negotiated by people, human typifications, significations and institutions come to be presented as part of an objective reality, particularly for future generations who were not involved in the original process of negotiation. For example, as parents negotiate rules for their children to follow, those rules confront the children as externally produced "givens" that they cannot change. Berger and Luckmann's social constructionism has its roots in phenomenology, a movement in continental philosophy. It links to Martin Heidegger and Edmund Husserl through the teaching of Alfred Schutz, who was also Berger's PhD adviser.

=== Narrative turn ===
During the 1970s and 1980s, social constructionist theory underwent a transformation as constructionist sociologists engaged with the work of Michel Foucault and others as a narrative turn in the social sciences was worked out in practice. This particularly affected the emergent sociology of science and the growing field of science and technology studies. In particular, Karin Knorr-Cetina, Bruno Latour, Barry Barnes, Steve Woolgar and others used social constructionism to relate what science has typically characterized as objective facts to the processes of social construction. Their goal was to show that human subjectivity imposes itself on the facts taken as objective, not solely the other way around. A particularly provocative title in this line of thought is Andrew Pickering's Constructing Quarks: A Sociological History of Particle Physics. At the same time, social constructionism shaped studies of technology—the Sofield, especially on the social construction of technology, or SCOT, and authors as Wiebe Bijker, Trevor Pinch, Maarten van Wesel, etc. Despite its common perception as objective, mathematics is not immune to social constructionist accounts. Sociologists such as Sal Restivo and Randall Collins, mathematicians including Reuben Hersh and Philip J. Davis, and philosophers including Paul Ernest have published social constructionist treatments of mathematics.

=== Postmodernism ===
Within the social constructionist strand of postmodernism, the concept of socially constructed reality stresses the ongoing mass-building of worldviews by individuals in dialectical interaction with society at a time. The numerous realities so formed comprise, according to this view, the imagined worlds of human social existence and activity. These worldviews are gradually crystallized by habit into institutions propped up by language conventions; given ongoing legitimacy by mythology, religion and philosophy; maintained by therapies and socialization; and subjectively internalized by upbringing and education. Together, these become part of the identity of social citizens.

In the book The Reality of Social Construction, the British sociologist Dave Elder-Vass places the development of social constructionism as one outcome of the legacy of postmodernism. He writes "Perhaps the most widespread and influential product of this process [coming to terms with the legacy of postmodernism] is social constructionism, which has been booming [within the domain of social theory] since the 1980s."

In the article, Navigating Social Worlds: A Theoretical Exploration of Phenomenological Sociology and the Construction of Social Realities, Javad and Zafar came up with the idea that individuals actively construct meaning by interpreting and illustrating their experiences, rather than observing what is going on around them. They create a reality through the experiences they have been through and create their own meaning. Social realities are not only created through intangible ideas, but are also woven, in a detailed way, into people's physical and sensory interactions with their surroundings. When people see things or experience things, they don't just see them; they feel deeply. According to Berger and Luckmann, people internalize cultural norms and values and create a "manufactured world" that only makes sense to those who are involved in that reality.

In the article, Homophily vs the Generalized Other, González discussed the term homophily, which says that people tend to connect with others who are similar to them or share their interests. In a group, these individuals can share their own behaviors on how they act in certain situations and learn from each other. They enhance their knowledge, create a new shared meaning, and better understand the topic and how to act in different contexts. Homophily can also be seen as contributing new knowledge with those who share common interests.

== Criticisms ==
Critics argue that social constructionism rejects the influences of biology on behaviour and culture, or suggests that they are unimportant to achieve an understanding of human behaviour. Scientific estimates of nature versus nurture and gene–environment interactions have shown almost always substantial influences of both genetics and social experiences, often in an inseparable manner. Claims that genetics does not affect humans are seen as outdated by most contemporary scholars of human development.

Social constructionism has also been criticized for having an overly narrow focus on society and culture as a causal factor in human behavior, excluding the influence of innate biological tendencies. This criticism has been explored by psychologists such as Steven Pinker in The Blank Slate as well as by Asian studies scholar Edward Slingerland in What Science Offers the Humanities. John Tooby and Leda Cosmides used the term standard social science model to refer to social theories that they believe fail to take into account the evolved properties of the brain.

In 1996, to illustrate what he believed to be the intellectual weaknesses of social constructionism and postmodernism, physics professor Alan Sokal submitted an article to the academic journal Social Text deliberately written to be incomprehensible but including phrases and jargon typical of the articles published by the journal. The submission, which was published, was an experiment to see if the journal would "publish an article liberally salted with nonsense if (a) it sounded good and (b) it flattered the editors' ideological preconceptions." In 1999, Sokal, with coauthor Jean Bricmont published the book Fashionable Nonsense, which criticized postmodernism and social constructionism.

Philosopher Paul Boghossian has also written against social constructionism. He follows Ian Hacking's argument that many adopt social constructionism because of its potentially liberating stance: if things are the way that they are only because of human social conventions, as opposed to being so naturally, then it should be possible to change them into how people would rather have them be. He then states that social constructionists argue that people should refrain from making absolute judgements about what is true and instead state that something is true in the light of this or that theory. Countering this, he states:

But it is hard to see how we might coherently follow this advice. Given that the propositions which make up epistemic systems are just very general propositions about what absolutely justifies what, it makes no sense to insist that we abandon making absolute particular judgements about what justifies what while allowing us to accept absolute general judgements about what justifies what. But in effect this is what the epistemic relativist is recommending.

Woolgar and Pawluch argue that constructionists tend to "ontologically gerrymander" social conditions in and out of their analysis.

Alan Sokal also criticizes social constructionism for contradicting itself on the knowability of the existence of societies. The argument is that if there was no knowable objective reality, there would be no way of knowing whether or not societies exist and if so, what their rules and other characteristics are. One example of the contradiction is that the claim that "phenomena must be measured by what is considered average in their respective cultures, not by an objective standard." Since there are languages that have no word for average and therefore the whole application of the concept of "average" to such cultures contradict social constructionism's own claim that cultures can only be measured by their own standards. Social constructionism is a diverse field with varying stances on these matters. Some social constructionists do acknowledge the existence of an objective reality but argue that human understanding and interpretation of that reality are socially constructed. Others might contend that while the term average may not exist in all languages, equivalent or analogous concepts might still be applied within those cultures, thereby not completely invalidating the principle of cultural relativity in measuring phenomena.

== See also ==
- Anekantavada a fundamental doctrine of Jainism setting forth a pluralistic metaphysics and epistemology, traceable to Mahavira (599–527 BCE)
- Consensus reality – Notion of reality based on consensus view
- Construct (philosophy) – Object whose existence depends upon a subject's mind
- Constructivism (international relations) – Social theory in international relations
- Constructivist epistemology – Hypothesis that scientific knowledge is constructed as models of reality
- Critical theory – Approach to social philosophy
- Empiricism – Idea that knowledge comes only/mainly from sensory experience
- Epochalism
- Nominalism – Philosophy emphasizing names and labels
- Parametric determinism – Marxist interpretation of history
- Phenomenology (psychology) – Utilisation of analytic tools from phenomenology to study the human psyche
- Social construction of technology – Theory in science and technology studies
- Social epistemology – Knowledge as a collective achievement
- Standard social science model – Alleged model of social science thought
- Tabula rasa – Idea of being born empty of mental content
- Ubuntu philosophy
