= Ralph Ueltzhoeffer =

Ralph Ueltzhoeffer (born 15 May 1966) is a German conceptual sculptor, photographer (Project Textportrait) and an internationally exhibited installation artist. He received his Bachelor of Fine Arts at Akademie der Bildenden Künste, Karlsruhe by Horst Antes. Ueltzhoeffer was born in Mannheim, Germany, lives and works currently in London and Berlin. His work has been exhibited in museums and expositions including the Shanghai Biennale "Rehearsal" (2010) and Willy Brandt Forum, Unkel.

Artwork: In 2002 Ralph Ueltzhoeffer creates the first biographical-portrait (Textportrait "David Beckham") and released them via Internet (2005). The popularity of textportraits got most fame by the death of Michael Jackson, thereupon the US software company Adobe developed a plugin for Photoshop CS. Ueltzhoeffer's artistic research is dedicated to the relationship of visual and written information in the digital sphere and their relevance for the beliefs one produces from these data. His search for new forms synchronizing visual and written information reacts and reflects on the internet as an open and central source of information in times of globalization and digitalization of data.
