= Werner Stark =

Austrian academic (1909–1985)

Werner Stark (2 December 1909 – 4 October 1985) was a sociologist and economist, who made important contributions to the sociology of knowledge, the sociology of religion, and the history of economic thought.

== Biography ==
Werner Stark was born in Marienbad, Austrian Empire (now in the Czech Republic), to parents of Jewish origin. His father, Adolf Stark, was a physician for a miners' union and a socialist city council member. His birth was registered by the rabbi of Marienbad, but he was raised as an atheist. After completing his secondary education in Marienbad, he enrolled in the University of Hamburg to study economics and social sciences. While there, he met his wife-to be, Kate Franck who was also a student at the University. He spent the 1930-31 session at the London School of Economics. Stark's training and scholarship encompassed history, philosophy, political science, law, economics, literature, art, music, and sociology. He held doctorates both in law and in political science. The rise of Nazism resulted in his leaving Germany for Prague in 1934, where he became a lecturer at the Prague School of Political Science.

In 1939, when the invading Nazis closed the university, Stark left for England, where he settled in Cambridge. He became interested in the economic writings of the philosopher Jeremy Bentham, and submitted three essays on the subject to John Maynard Keynes, editor of the Economic Journal: Keynes was impressed, and encouraged Stark to work further on the subject, and to produce an edition of Bentham's economic writings (eventually published under the auspices of the Royal Economic Society in three volumes in 1952–54). In 1941, influenced by the writings of John Henry Newman, Stark converted to Roman Catholicism. In 1944, he was called up to serve in the British Army, initially in the Pioneer Corps and afterwards in the Intelligence Corps.

After the war, Stark taught at British universities, including Cambridge, Edinburgh, and Manchester, until his acceptance in 1963 of a professorship at Fordham University, New York. He stayed at Fordham until his mandatory retirement in 1975, when he returned to Europe, holding an honorary professorship at the University of Salzburg, Austria, until his death there in 1985.

Stark was internationally recognized for work in the sociology of religion, social theory, and sociology of knowledge. His scholarship was consistently multidisciplinary, his research constantly nourished by his teaching. After his conversion, his adopted religion became an important influence in his life. Stark was distressed by what he considered religion's erosion in the modern world, strongly believing that religion provides guidelines for individual action that neither custom nor law can give. As he saw it, excessive individualism lay at the root of Christianity's contemporary crisis. He believed that modern intellectuals had been strongly affected by post-Renaissance rationalism, resulting in "a super-rationalism which tends to blind them towards many non-rational values, for instance, those of tradition, of religion, and even of art" (The Sociology of Knowledge, Routledge, 1958).

In the sociology of religion, Stark considered Max Weber's work a challenge of great importance, although he thought Weber lacked necessary insight into "true religiosity" (The Sociology of Religion, 5 volumes, Fordham University Press, 1966-1972). His international reputation was both reflected and built by translations of many of his works into Japanese, Italian, German, and Spanish. The Social Bond (6 volumes, Fordham University Press, 1976-1987) is considered by some critics to be definitive in establishing his intellectual legacy.

== Major publications ==
- "Liberty and Equality, or: Jeremy Bentham as an Economist, I. Bentham's Doctrine", Economic Journal, vol. 51 (1941), pp. 56–79
- The Ideal Foundations of Economic Thought, 1943 (1975)
- The History of Economics in its Relation to Social Development, 1944
- "Jeremy Bentham as an Economist, II. Bentham's Influence", Economic Journal, vol. 56 (1946), pp. 583–608
- "Diminishing Utility Reconsidered", Kyklos, 1947
- America: Ideal and Reality (1947)
- "Stable Equilibrium Re-examined", Kyklos, 1947
- (edited) Jeremy Benthams Economics Writings (3 vols.), 1952–54
- The Sociology of Knowledge: An Essay in Aid of a Deeper Understanding of the History of Ideas. London: Routledge & Kegan Paul. 1958. ISBN 9780710065544 – via Internet Archive.
- "The 'Classical Situation' in Political Economy", Kyklos, 1959
- The Fundamental Forms of Social Thought, 1963
- The Sociology of Religion: A Study of Christendom (5 vols.), 1966–72
  - Vol. 1: Established Religion
  - Vol. 2: Sectarian Religion
  - Vol. 3: The Universal Church
  - Vol. 4: Types of Religious Man
  - Vol. 5: Types of Religious Culture
- The Social Bond (6 vols.), 1976–87
- History and Historians of Political Economy (ed. Charles M.A. Clark), 1994

== Bibliography ==
- Clark, Charles M.A. (2001). "Werner Stark and the sociology of knowledge approach to the history of economics". In Medema, Steven G.; Samuels, Warren J. (eds.). Historians of Economics and Economic Thought: The Construction of Disciplinary Memory. London: Routledge. ISBN 0415185815.
- Das, Robin R. (2008). The Place of Werner Stark in American Sociology: a study in marginality. PhD Thesis. New York: Fordham University.
- Leonard, Eileen B.; Strasser, Hermann; Westhues, Kenneth, eds. (1993). In Search of Community: essays in memory of Werner Stark (1909-1985). New York: Fordham UP. ISBN 0-8232-1352-8.
- McCarthy, E. Doyle (1991). "Introduction". In Stark, Werner (ed.). The Sociology of Knowledge. New Brunswick, NJ: Transaction. pp. ix–xix. ISBN 1-56000-557-2.
- Schofield, Philip (2009). "Werner Stark and Jeremy Bentham's economic writings". History of European Ideas. 35 (4): 475–94. doi:10.1016/j.histeuroideas.2009.05.003. S2CID 144165469.
- Szmrecsanyi, T. (2001). "J.A. Schumpeter, Werner Stark, and the historiography of economic thought". Journal of the History of Economic Thought. 23 (4): 491–512. doi:10.1080/10427710120096974. S2CID 145503835.
