= Typification =

Concept in sociology

Typification is a process of creating standard (typical) social construction based on standard assumptions. Discrimination based on typification is called typism.

== See also ==
- Ideal type
- Normal type
- Typology
