= Figurational sociology =

Research method

Figurational sociology is a research tradition in which figurations of humans—evolving networks of interdependent humans—are the unit of investigation. Although more a methodological stance than a determinate school of practice, the tradition has one essential feature:

- Concern for process, not state. Figurational sociology is also referred to as process sociology. This feature is an attempt to correct for an in-built language prejudice which tilts theory to reduce processes into static elements, separating, for example, human actors from their actions. Just as linguists rely on etymology to gain a rich understanding of a word's history, which may help to understand its later uses, figurational sociologists attempt to look at the process of a social feature's emergence and evolution to gain a fuller understanding of its function in the present.

Practitioners may be said to be inspired by the ideal that the usual humanities barrier between micro (e.g. psychological) and macro (e.g. state organization) is removed, and their causal links opened to examination. As a consequence, much of the work done in the name of this approach has examined the connection between changes in psychology and personhood, on the one hand, and changes in macro social structures on the other.

Norbert Elias is usually acknowledged as an early or primary practitioner, as a consequence of his ground-breaking 1939 work The Civilizing Process.
