= Sociology of knowledge =

Study of the relationship between thought, social context, and consequences for society

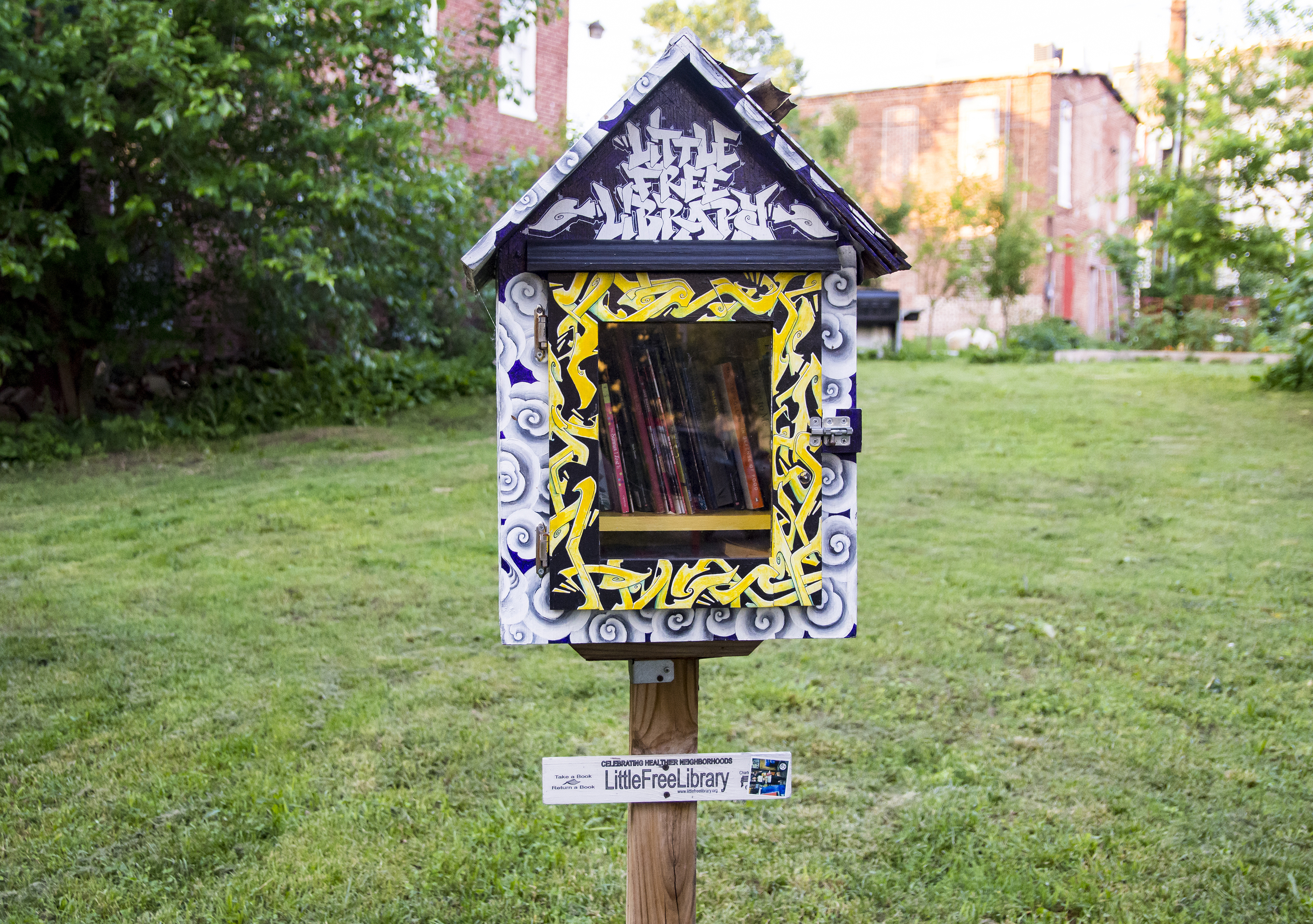
A Little Free Library for exchanging books and other literary materials

The sociology of knowledge is the study of the relationship between human thought, the social context within which it arises, and the effects that prevailing ideas, beliefs, and concepts have on societies. It is a major applicative subclass of cognitive sociology, rather than a specialization in its own right, and its practice involves asking broad fundamental questions about the extent and limits of social influences upon individuals' lives, as well as the social-cultural basis of a society's knowledge about the world. The sociology of scientific knowledge is one subclass of the sociology of knowledge, and the sociology of scientific ignorance is its complement.

The sociology of knowledge was pioneered primarily by the sociologist Émile Durkheim at the beginning of the 20th century. His work deals directly with how conceptual thought, language, and logic can be influenced by the societal milieu in which they arise. The 1903 essay Primitive Classification, by Durkheim and Marcel Mauss, invoked "primitive" group mythology to argue that classification systems are collectively based and that the divisions within these systems derive from social categories. In his 1912 The Elementary Forms of the Religious Life, Durkheim elaborated on his theory of knowledge. In this work, he examined how languages, concepts, and the categories (such as space and time) used in logical thought have a sociological origin. Neither Durkheim nor Mauss specifically coined the term "sociology of knowledge". However, their work was an exceptional contribution to the subject.

The widespread use of the term sociology of knowledge emerged in the 1920s, when several German-speaking sociologists, most notably Max Scheler and Karl Mannheim, wrote extensively on sociological aspects of knowledge. This was followed in 1937 by a much-cited survey of the subject by Robert K. Merton, the American sociologist, "The sociology of knowledge". With the dominance of functionalism through the middle years of the 20th century, the sociology of knowledge remained on the periphery of mainstream sociological thought. However, it was reinvented and applied closely to everyday life in the 1960s, particularly by Peter L. Berger and Thomas Luckmann in The Social Construction of Reality (1966). It is still central for methods dealing with a qualitative understanding of human society (compare socially constructed reality). The genealogical and archaeological studies of Michel Foucault are of considerable contemporary influence.

== History ==
=== The Enlightenment ===
Peter Hamilton argues that the thinkers of the Enlightenment produced a sociology of ideas and values when they turned their attention to the scientific analysis of society. He argues that specific values inherent in critical rationalism, such as anthropocentrism (i.e., the assumption that humans are the most crucial element in understanding reality), were central to these thinkers' understanding of society. Hamilton argues that these thinkers were committed to progress and the freedom of the individual to determine his own beliefs and values, which are at odds with traditional moral considerations in theology. The empirical method of cross-cultural comparison became a methodology for understanding society rather than the idea of revealed truth inherent in sociology, leading to a measure of cultural relativism.

He argues that some thinkers sought to change society based on their theories. These ideas play out in the French Revolution with its Reign of Terror. Hamilton argues that the Enlightenment can be seen as a critical response to the Christian theology used by the Jacobins, which manipulated people's understanding of truth to maintain a feudal order.

=== Earlier viewpoints ===
The sociology of knowledge requires a particular viewpoint that Giambattista Vico first expounded in his New Science in the early 18th century, long before the first sociologists studied the relationship between knowledge and society. The book, a justification for a new historical and sociological methodology, suggests that the natural and social worlds are known in different ways. The former is known through external or empirical methods, while the latter can be known internally and externally. In other words, human history is a construct that creates a critical epistemological distinction between the natural and social worlds, a central concept in the social sciences. Primarily focused on historical methodology, Vico asserts that it is necessary to move beyond a chronicle of events to study a society's history. He examined society's cultural elements, which were termed the "civil world". This "civil world", made up of actions, thoughts, ideas, myths, norms, religious beliefs, and institutions, is the product of the human mind. These socially constructed elements can be better understood than the physical world, as it is in abstraction. Vico highlights that human nature and its products are not fixed entities. Therefore, it necessitates a historical perspective emphasizing the changes and developments implicit in individuals and societies. He also emphasizes the dialectical relationship between society and culture as key in this new historical perspective.

While permeated by his penchant for etymology, Vico's ideas and a theory of cyclical history (corsi e ricorsi), are significant for the underlying premise about our understanding and knowledge of social structure. They are dependent upon the ideas and concepts we employ and the language used. Vico was primarily unknown in his own time. He was the first to establish the foundations of a sociology of knowledge, even though later writers did not necessarily pick up his concepts. There is evidence that Montesquieu and Karl Marx read Vico's work. However, the similarities in their works are superficial, limited mainly to the overall conception of their projects. They were characterized by cultural relativism and historicism.

== Major theorists in the sociology of knowledge ==
=== Émile Durkheim ===
Émile Durkheim (1858–1917) is credited as having been the first professor to successfully establish the field of sociology, institutionalizing a department of sociology at the University de Bordeaux in the 1890s. While his works deal with several subjects, including suicide, the family, social structures, and social institutions, a large part of his work deals with the sociology of knowledge.

While publishing short articles on the subject early in his career (for example, the essay "De quelques formes primitives de classification" written in 1902 with Marcel Mauss), Durkheim worked mainly out of a Kantian framework and sought to understand how logical thought concepts and categories could arise out of social life. He argued, for example, that the types of space and time were not a priori. Instead, the category of space depends on a society's social grouping and geographical use of space, and a group's social rhythm determines our understanding of time. Durkheim sought to combine elements of rationalism and empiricism, arguing that certain aspects of logical thought common to all humans did exist, but that they were products of collective life (thus contradicting the tabula rasa empiricist understanding whereby categories are acquired by individual experience alone), and that they were not universal a priori truths (as Kant argued) since the content of the categories differed from society to society.

Another key element to Durkheim's theory of knowledge is his concept of représentations collectives (collective representations), which he outlined in 1912 in The Elementary Forms of the Religious Life. Représentations collectives are the symbols and images that come to represent the ideas, beliefs, and values elaborated by a collectivity and are not reducible to individual constituents. They can include words, slogans, ideas, or any number of material items that can serve as a symbol, such as a cross, a rock, a temple, a feather, etc. As Durkheim elaborates, représentations collectives are created through intense social interaction and are products of collective activity. As such, these representations have the particular, and somewhat contradictory, aspect that they exist externally to the individual (since they are created and controlled not by the individual but by society as a whole), and yet simultaneously within each individual of the society (by virtue of that individual's participation within society). Language is an important représentation collective, which, according to Durkheim, is a product of collective action. And because language is a collective action, language contains within it a history of accumulated knowledge and experience that no individual would be capable of creating alone. As Durkheim says, représentations collectives, and language in particular:

"Add to that which we can learn by our own personal experience all that wisdom and science which the group has accumulated in the course of centuries. Thinking by concepts is not merely seeing reality on its most general side, but it is projecting a light upon the sensation which illuminates it, penetrates it, and transforms it."

As such, language, as a social product, literally structures and shapes our experience of reality, an idea developed by later French philosophers, such as Michel Foucault. This is not to be confused with the controversial proposal that language shapes the human capacity for thought: the Sapir-Whorf Hypothesis.

=== Karl Mannheim ===
The German political philosophers Karl Marx (1818–1883) and Friedrich Engels (1820–1895) argued in Die deutsche Ideologie (1846, The German Ideology) and elsewhere that people's ideologies, including their social and political beliefs and opinions, are rooted in their class interests and more broadly in the social and economic circumstances in which they live:

"It is men, who in developing their material inter-course, change, along with this their real existence, their thinking and the products of their thinking. Being is not determined by consciousness, but consciousness by being." (Marx-Engels Gesamtausgabe 1/5)

Under the influence of this doctrine and of phenomenology, the Hungarian-born German sociologist Karl Mannheim (1893–1947) gave impetus to the growth of the sociology of knowledge with his Ideologie und Utopie (1929, translated and extended in 1936 as Ideology and Utopia), although the term had been introduced five years earlier by the co-founder of the movement, the German philosopher, phenomenologist and social theorist Max Scheler (1874–1928), in Versuche zu einer Soziologie des Wissens (1924, Attempts at a Sociology of Knowledge).

Mannheim feared that this interpretation could be seen to claim that all knowledge and beliefs are the products of socio-political forces since this form of relativism is self-defeating (if it is true, then it too is merely a product of socio-political forces and has no claim to truth and no persuasive force). Mannheim believed that relativism was a strange mixture of modern and ancient beliefs in that it contained within itself a belief in an absolute truth that was true for all times and places (the ancient view most often associated with Plato) and condemned other truth claims because they could not achieve this level of objectivity (an idea gleaned from Marx). Mannheim sought to escape this problem with the idea of relationism. This is the idea that certain things are true only in certain times and places (a view influenced by pragmatism) however, this does not make them less true. Mannheim felt that a stratum of free-floating intellectuals (who he claimed were only loosely anchored to the class structure of society) could most perfectly realize this form of truth by creating a "dynamic synthesis" of the ideologies of other groups.

The sociology of Mannheim is specified with particular attention to the forms of transmission of culture and knowledge. It follows the constellations of senses and options that, through the generations, are related to the transmission and reproduction of values.

=== Michel Foucault ===
The work of Michel Foucault made a particularly important contemporary contribution to the sociology of knowledge. Madness and Civilization (1961) postulated that conceptions of madness and what was considered "reason" or "knowledge" were themselves subject to major culture bias, in this respect mirroring similar criticisms by Thomas Szasz (1920–2012), at the time the foremost critic of psychiatry and subsequently an eminent psychiatrist. Foucault and Szasz agreed that sociological processes played a major role in defining "madness" as an "illness" and in prescribing "cures". In The Birth of the Clinic: An Archeology of Medical Perception (1963), Foucault extended his critique to institutional clinical medicine, arguing for the central conceptual metaphor of "The Gaze", which had implications for medical education, prison design, and the carceral state as understood today. Concepts of criminal justice and its intersection with medicine were better developed in this work than in the contributions of Szasz and others, who confined their critique to current psychiatric practice. Foucault's The Order of Things (1966) and The Archeology of Knowledge (1969) introduced abstract notions of mathesis and taxonomia to explain the subjective 'ordering' of the human sciences. These, he claimed, had transformed 17th and 18th-century studies of "general grammar" into modern "linguistics", "natural history" into modern "biology", and "analysis of wealth" into modern "economics"—though not, claimed Foucault, without loss of meaning. Foucault believed that the 19th century transformed what knowledge was.

Foucault stated that "man did not exist" before the 18th century. Foucault regarded notions of humanity and of humanism as inventions of modernity. Accordingly, a cognitive bias had been introduced unwittingly into science, by over-trusting the individual doctor or scientist's ability to see and state things objectively. Foucault roots this argument in the rediscovery of Kant, though his thought is significantly influenced by Nietzsche – who famously declared the "death of God" in the 19th century, and the anti-humanists proposing the "death of Man" in the 20th.

In Discipline and Punish: the Birth of the Prison (1975), Foucault concentrates on the correlation between knowledge and power. According to him, knowledge is a form of power and can conversely be used against individuals as a form of power. As a result, knowledge is socially constructed. He argues that knowledge forms discourses, which, in turn, form the dominant ideological ways of thinking that govern human lives. For him, social control is maintained in 'the disciplinary society' through codes of control over sexuality and the ideas/knowledge perpetuated through social institutions. In other words, discourses and ideologies subject us to authority and turn people into 'subjected beings', who are afraid of being punished if they sway from social norms. Foucault believes that institutions overtly regulate and control our lives. Institutions such as schools reinforce the dominant ideological forms of thinking in the populace and force us into becoming obedient and docile beings. Hence, the dominant ideology that serves the interests of the ruling class, all the while appearing as 'neutral', needs to be questioned and must not go unchallenged.

=== Robert K. Merton ===
American sociologist Robert K. Merton (1910–2003) dedicates a section of Social Theory and Social Structure (1949; revised and expanded, 1957 and 1968) to the study of the sociology of knowledge in Part III, titled The Sociology of Knowledge and Mass Communications. For the news in this prospect, see Guglielmo Rinzivillo, Robert King Merton Utet, Turin, 2019.

== Currents within and parallel to the sociology of knowledge ==
=== Phenomenological sociology ===
Phenomenological sociology is the study of the formal structures of concrete social existence as made available in and through the analytical description of acts of intentional consciousness. The "object" of such an analysis is the meaningful lived world of everyday life: the "Lebenswelt", or life-world (Husserl:1889). The task, like that of every other phenomenological investigation, is to describe the formal structures of this object of investigation in subjective terms, as an object-constituted-in-and-for-consciousness (Gurwitsch:1964). The utilization of phenomenological methods is what makes such a description different from the "naive" subjective descriptions of the man in the street, or those of the traditional, positivist social scientist.

The leading proponent of phenomenological sociology was Alfred Schütz (1899–1959). Schütz sought to provide a critical philosophical foundation for the interpretive sociology of Max Weber (1864–1920) through the use of phenomenological methods derived from the transcendental phenomenological investigations of Edmund Husserl (1859–1938). Husserl's work aimed at establishing the formal structures of intentional consciousness. Schütz's work was directed at establishing the formal structures of the Life-world (Schütz:1980). Husserl's work was conducted as a transcendental phenomenology of consciousness. Schütz's work was conducted as a mundane phenomenology of the Life-world (Natanson:1974). The difference in their research projects lies in the level of analysis, the objects taken as topics of study, and the type of phenomenological reduction that is employed for the purposes of analysis. Ultimately, the two projects should be seen as complementary, with the structures of the latter dependent on the structures of the former. That is, valid phenomenological descriptions of the formal structures of the Life-world should be wholly consistent with the descriptions of the formal structures of intentional consciousness. It is from the latter that the former derives its validity and truth value (Sokolowski:2000).

The phenomenological tie-in with the sociology of knowledge stems from two key historical sources for Mannheim's analysis:

1. Mannheim was dependent on insights derived from Husserl's phenomenological investigations, especially the theory of meaning as found in Husserl's Logical Investigations of 1900/1901 (Husserl:2000), in the formulation of his central methodological work: "On The Interpretation of Weltanschauung" (Mannheim:1993:see fn41 & fn43) – this essay forms the centerpiece for Mannheim's method of historical understanding and is central to his conception of the sociology of knowledge as a research program.
2. The concept of "Weltanschauung" employed by Mannheim has its origins in the hermeneutic philosophy of Wilhelm Dilthey (1833–1911), who relied on Husserl's theory of meaning (above) for his methodological specification of the interpretive act (Mannheim: 1993: see fn38).

It is also noteworthy that Husserl's analysis of the formal structures of consciousness, and Schütz's analysis of the formal structures of the Life-world are specifically intended to establish the foundations in consciousness for the understanding and interpretation of a social world that is subject to cultural and historical change. The phenomenological position is that although the facticity of the social world may be culturally and historically relative, the formal structures of consciousness, and the processes by which we come to know and understand this facticity are not. That is, the understanding of any actual social world is unavoidably dependent on understanding the structures and processes of consciousness that found, and constitute, any possible social world.

Alternatively, if the facticity of the social world and the structures of consciousness prove to be culturally and historically relative, then we are at an impasse in regard to any meaningful scientific understanding of the social world that is not subjective (as opposed to being objective and grounded in nature [positivism], or inter-subjective and grounded in the structures of consciousness [phenomenology]), and relative to the cultural and idealization formations of particular concrete individuals living in a particular socio-historical group.

=== Knowledge ecology ===
Knowledge ecology is a concept originating from knowledge management that aims at "bridging the gap between the static data repositories of knowledge management and the dynamic, adaptive behavior of natural systems", in particular relying on the concepts of interaction and emergence. Knowledge ecology, and its related concept information ecology has been elaborated by different academics and practitioners, such as Thomas H. Davenport, Bonnie Nardi, or Swidler.

=== New Sociology of Knowledge ===
The New Sociology of Knowledge (a postmodern approach considering knowledge as culture by drawing upon Marxist, French structuralist, and American pragmatist traditions) introduces concepts that dictate how knowledge is socialized in the modern era by new kinds of social organizations and structures.

=== Legitimation code theory ===
Legitimation code theory (LCT) emerged in the 2000s as a framework for the study of knowledge and education and is now being used to analyse a growing range of social and cultural practices across increasingly different institutional and national contexts, both within and beyond education. The approach primarily builds on the work of Basil Bernstein (1924–2000) and of Pierre Bourdieu (1930–2002). It also integrates insights from sociology (including Durkheim, Marx, Weber and Foucault), systemic functional linguistics, philosophy (such as Karl Popper and critical realism), early cultural studies, anthropology (especially Mary Douglas and Ernest Gellner), and other approaches.

=== Southern theory ===
Southern theory is an approach to the sociology of knowledge that looks at the global production of sociological knowledge and the dominance of the global north. It was first developed by Australian sociologist Raewyn Connell in her book Southern Theory, and applied with colleagues at the University of Sydney and elsewhere to a number of contexts. Southern theory offers a decolonizing perspective within the sociology of knowledge that seeks to emphasize perspectives from the global south to counter bias towards the perspectives of theorists and social scientists from the global north.

== See also ==
- Agnotology
- Bibliography of sociology
- Epistemology
- Knowledge
- Knowledge falsification
- Knowledge management
- Memetics
- Ontology
- Social constructivism
- Socially constructed reality
- Sociology of scientific ignorance
- Sociology of scientific knowledge

=== Sociologists of knowledge ===
- Émile Durkheim
- Marcel Mauss
- Max Scheler
- Karl Mannheim
- Werner Stark
- Alfred Schutz
- Harold Garfinkel
- Peter L. Berger
- Thomas Luckmann
- Michel Foucault
- Kurt Heinrich Wolff
- Basil Bernstein
