= Thomas Luckmann =

Slovene-born sociologist

- Born: Tomaž Luckmann; 14 October 1927; Jesenice, Kingdom of Yugoslavia (now Slovenia)
- Died: 10 May 2016 (aged 88); Austria
- Spouse: Benita Petkevic (m. 1950; died 1987)
- Children: 3

Academic background
- Education: University of Vienna; University of Innsbruck; The New School for Social Research (MA, PhD)

Academic work
- Discipline: Sociology; Philosophy
- Sub-discipline: Phenomenology; Sociology of knowledge Sociology of religion Sociology of language [[[Social constructionism]]
- Institutions: The New School for Social Research; Hobart College; Goethe University Frankfurt; University of Konstanz

Thomas Luckmann (/ˈlʌkmən/; October 14, 1927 – May 10, 2016) was a Slovene-born sociologist who taught mainly in Germany. Born in Jesenice, Kingdom of Yugoslavia, Luckmann studied philosophy and linguistics at the University of Vienna and the University of Innsbruck. He married Benita Petkevic in 1950. His contributions were central to studies in sociology of communication, sociology of knowledge, sociology of religion, and the philosophy of science. His best-known titles are the 1966 book, The Social Construction of Reality: A Treatise in the Sociology of Knowledge (co-authored with Peter L. Berger), The Invisible Religion (1967), and The Structures of the Life-World (1973) (co-authored with Alfred Schütz)

== Overview ==
=== Early life ===
Luckmann was born in 1927 in Jesenice, which at the time was part of the Kingdom of Yugoslavia. He had an Austrian father who was an industrialist, his mother was from a Slovene family from Ljubljana. On his mother's side, he was the cousin of the Slovene poet Božo Vodušek. As a child he was exposed to two vastly different cultures, and Luckmann had the advantage of growing up in a bilingual environment speaking both Slovene and German. He attended Slovene-language schools while in Jesenice until the year 1941, when the occupation of Slovenia during World War II forced him to transfer to Klagenfurt high school in Austria. Later in 1943, he and his mother relocated to Vienna after the death of his father and several other relatives during World War II. Living in Austria during this period automatically granted him German citizenship, and in 1944 he was drafted into the German army, joining the Luftwaffe where he served as a Luftwaffenhelfer. Luckmann was transferred to a military hospital for minor injuries shortly before the end of the war. Luckmann was in the hospital in Bavaria when the United States liberated the region. After liberation in 1945 Luckmann became a prisoner of war, where he remained until the end of the war. He then settled back to Vienna and he could finish his high school exit exams, the "Matura."

=== Educational background ===
Luckmann attended high school in Klagenfurt, Austria, after he and his family fled Italian occupation in Ljubljana in 1941. After the end of the war, Luckmann could return to school in Klagenfurt and pass his exit exams, the "Matura." Luckmann began studying philosophy and linguistics at the University of Vienna in 1947 and continued in Innsbruck in 1948, studying different subjects in the social science field. He moved to the United States in 1950 with his wife, Benita Petkevic, where he then studied at The New School in New York City.

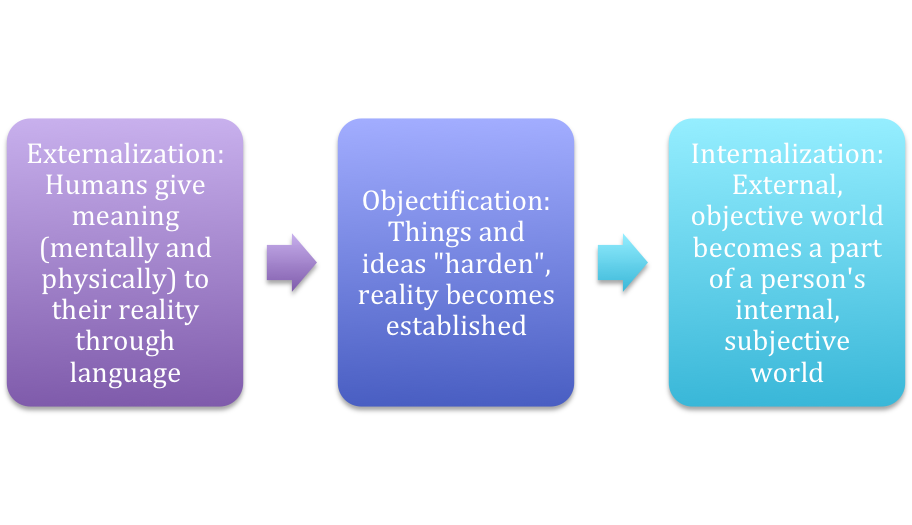
The social construction of reality

At The New School, Luckmann began to discern his career as a sociologist. He was taught by Alfred Schütz, Dorion Cairns, Albert Salomon, and Carl Meyer; they later became a great influence on Luckmann. This was when he was first introduced to the sociological discipline, and then he became familiar with Alfred Schütz's work on sociological phenomenology. He went on to meet Peter Berger, with whom he would later go on to co-author The Social Construction of Reality, which later ended up becoming one of his most notable works. Together, he and his colleagues produced some of the most influential sociological works of the 20th century.

Luckmann never intended to become a sociologist. His initial academic interests resided in linguistics, history and philosophy. At The New School, Luckmann primarily studied philosophy and chose to study sociology as a second subject, influenced by the professors there. For example, Luckmann was introduced to the sociology of religion when his teacher at the time, Carl Meyer, asked him to do field work about churches in Germany after World War II. Captivated by his experience in Germany, Luckmann used his fieldwork to pursue a Ph.D. in sociology. He obtained his first academic position at Hobart College, in Geneva, New York, before returning to teach at The New School after the death of Alfred Schütz. Luckmann was eventually granted a professorship position at the University of Frankfurt in 1965. After publishing two books in 1963 and 1966, and several successful essays, Luckmann worked as a professor of Sociology at the University of Konstanz in Germany from 1970 to his retirement, and later professor emeritus. It is noted that his time in at Konstanz was marked as an intense period of interdisciplinary work, in which he wrote multiple essays concerning communication, linguistics, literature and history.

=== Life events ===
In 1950, Luckmann married Benita Petkevic, who was a Latvian-born sociologist who taught in the United States and Germany. It was said that their marriage was a turning point for his life, among many other factors. The couple had three daughters, Maja, Mara, and Metka. On May 10, 2016, Luckmann died of cancer at the age of 88 at his home in Austria.

=== Legacy ===
Luckmann's ideas and theories have been influential within the field in sociology and has had a huge impact on the world and intellectual thought.

50th Anniversary Social Construction Thomas Luckmann.

== Works ==
Early Work

Luckmann worked as a chauffeur and his wife, Benita, worked as a typist when they first moved to New York. During this time, he continued studying sociology and philosophy at the New School for Research. It was there where he first met some of the great influences of his life, including Peter L. Berger.

=== Concepts ===
==== Philosophy and social thought ====
Luckmann was a follower of the phenomenologically oriented school of sociology, established by the Austrian American scholar Alfred Schütz. He contributed to the foundation of phenomenological sociology, the sociology of religion in modern societies, and the sociology of knowledge and communication. The interdisciplinary nature of his work remains relevant in sociology and other disciplines today.

==== Social constructionism ====
Social constructionism focuses on the study of the process of social construction. It could be described as an "approach" that is neither a theory of religion or any other social phenomenon. In several of his works, he developed the theory of social constructionism, which argues that all knowledge, including the most basic common-sense knowledge of everyday reality, which included gender, ethnicity, nations, and religion. It's derived from and maintained by social interactions especially through language. Together with Peter L. Berger, he wrote the book The Social Construction of Reality, and it was published by 1966. The book was an important part of the move in sociology as it established "social construction" as part of sociological vocabulary. It was also particularly with the sociology of religion, away from the view of religion and religious values as central to the social order, arguing that social order is socially constructed by individuals and/or groups of individuals. Since publication, the book has been translated into thirteen different languages and serves as a cornerstone in sociological literature. Berger wrote on their experience writing the book saying "someone asked, Why did not The Social Construction of Reality immediately have a huge effect? The effect came much later, and my answer was that you cannot play chamber music at a rock concert. And compared to what was going on all around us in the social sciences, we were doing chamber music."

==== Sociology of religion ====
Following his fieldwork in Germany and the completion of his dissertation, Luckmann was asked to complete several reviews on the surrounding sociological literature concerning religion. Disappointed by the positivistic, unauthentic views of a Church-backed sociology of religion, Luckmann was compelled to write The Invisible Religion in 1963 under the German title Das Problem der Religion in der modernen Gesellschaft. The book was then translated into English in 1967. Luckmann proposes that there are four derivative types of religion. The first of those he calls "a universal and nonspecific elementary social form which is an objective total worldview providing social meaning for a society's existence." The second, "the specific institutional social form of religion constituted by configurations of religious representations form- ing a sacred cosmos which is part of the worldview." The third, "a universal nonspecific form of individual religiosity which is an internalized subjective system of relevance reflecting the objectivated universal and nonspecific elementary social form of religion." Lastly, "a specific biographical form of religiosity in individual consciousness." Drawing from Durkheim, Luckmann developed a functional perspective in his theoretical objectives. Luckmann's theory reiterate's Durkheim's notion that "the original symbol system whereby man emerged from the animal world was religious." Rather than reverting to popular explanations of secularization, Luckmann explained the emergence of a new kind of religion in the 20th century: private religion He explains the diffusion of world views and institutional de-specialization of religion led to a privatization, rather than a retreat, from religion. Though Luckmann initially received harsh criticisms, The Invisible Religion became a pivotal move within the sociology of religion in the 20th century, especially in conjunction with The Social Construction of Reality.

==== Sociology of Knowledge and Communication ====
Luckmann's contribution to the sociology of knowledge and communication is based on his careful analysis of the link between socio-cultural linguistic practices and the construction of social reality. His sociology of knowledge provides a theoretical framework that allows the sociology of knowledge approach to discourse. Based on his empirical research of conversational analysis, Luckmann explains his theory of “communicative genres” in which linguistic types, such as, gossip, proverbs, or jokes, all serve as forms of social knowledge, and act as tools for the formation of social structure. He offers a comprehensive view on society as symbolic order and ordering, including levels and actors' agencies, and the interplay between both. There's an emphasis the role of language and the daily "conversation machinery" for the construction of the shared social reality. His ethnography of speaking, modeled a social interactional code that gave a dissimilar approach to sources of social constraint.

==== Social action ====
Luckmann continued this analysis of social action, and in 1982 he continued the work of Alfred Schütz, drawing on Schütz's notes and unfinished manuscripts to complete Structures of the Life-World, published (posthumously for Schütz) in 1982. Luckmann then built upon Schütz's analysis and published, Theory of Social Action in 1992.

Together with Richard Grathoff and Walter M. Sprondel, Luckmann founded the Social Science Archive Konstanz (also known as the Alfred Schütz Memorial Archives). What became the official archive of the German Sociological Association, Luckmann and his colleagues gathered research accounts of German social science.

In 1998, he was awarded an honorary doctorate from the Norwegian University of Science and Technology (NTNU).

In 2004, Luckmann became an honorary member of the Slovenian Sociological Association. The German Sociological Association awarded him a prize for his outstanding lifetime contribution to sociology at its 2002 Congress, and Luckmann became an honorary member in 2016.

The original Thomas Luckmann Papers are deposited in the Social Science Archive Konstanz.

== Bibliography ==
- The Social Construction of Reality (1966, with Peter L. Berger)
- The Invisible Religion (1967)
- The Sociology of Language (1975)
- Structures of the Life-World (1982, with Alfred Schütz)
- Life-World and Social Realities (1983)
- Theory of Social Action (1992)

== See also ==
- Jože Pučnik
