= Aron Gurwitsch =

Lithuanian American phenomenologist (1901–1973)

Aron Gurwitsch (Russian: Арон Гурвич; 17 January 1901 – 25 June 1973) was a Lithuanian-born German-American philosopher and phenomenologist.

== Life ==
Gurwitsch was born in Vilna, Vilna Governorate, Russian Empire, on 17 January 1901 to a Lithuanian Jewish family. His family moved to Danzig in 1905 or 1906 to escape pogroms. He enrolled in the University of Berlin in 1918, where he studied under Carl Stumpf.

In the early 1929s, he studied under Edmund Husserl at the University of Göttingen and with Adhémar Gelb and Kurt Goldstein at the University of Frankfurt am Main.

Gurwitsch completed his doctorate at Göttingen in 1928 on Phänomenologie der Thematik und des reinen Ich under Moritz Geiger.

He died on 25 June 1973 in Zürich.

== Work ==
Gurwitsch wrote on the relations between phenomenology and Gestalt psychology, and in the problems of the organization of consciousness. In particular, he distinguished between the theme, the thematic context and the margin. This is the core of his theory of the field of consciousness. He also has his own theory of the noema, the horizon and the transcendental ego. Gurwitsch was an important influence on Maurice Merleau-Ponty.

He taught at the University of Paris (at the Institut d'Histoire des Sciences et des Techniques) from 1933 until he was forced to emigrate in 1940, where Merleau-Ponty attended his lectures. He taught at Brandeis University in the mid-1950s. He taught at The New School's Graduate Faculty of Social and Political Science from 1959 to 1973.

== Bibliography ==
- Théorie du champ de la conscience (1957). Translated: Field of Consciousness, Pittsburgh, Pa.: Duquesne University Press (1964).
- Studies in phenomenology and psychology. Evanston, Ill.: Northwestern University Press (1966).
- Leibniz, New York: de Gruyter (1974).
- Phenomenology and the Theory of Science. Edited by Lester Embree. Evanston, Ill.: Northwestern University Press (1974).
- Kants Theories des Verstandes, edited by Thomas Seebohm. Dordrecht: Kluwer Academic Publishers (1990).
- The Collected Works of Aron Gurwitsch (1901–1973) published by Springer.
  - Vol. I: Constitutive Phenomenology in Historical Perspective
  - Volume II: Studies in Phenomenology and Psychology
  - Volume III: The Field of Consciousness: Theme, Thematic Field, and Margin
