= Jaszi =

Jaszi (originally Jászi) is a Hungarian surname.

== List of people with the surname ==
- Andrew Jaszi (1917–1998), son of Anna and Oszkár, was an American philosopher and literary scholar.
- Anna Jászi, known as Anna Lesznai (1885–1966), was a Hungarian writer.
- Oszkár Jászi (1875–1957) was a Hungarian social scientist, historian, and politician.
- Peter Jaszi, grandson of Oszkár, is an American expert on copyright law.
