= Alabert Fogarasi =

Hungarian philosopher (1891–1959)

Béla Fogarasi, also known as Alabert Fogarasi (25 July 1891 – 28 April 1959) was a Hungarian philosopher and politician.

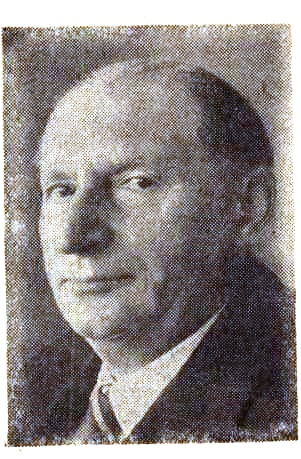
Béla Fogarasi

== Life ==
Fogarasi was born as Béla Fried on 25 July 1891 in Budapest, and studied in Budapest and Heidelberg. In 1910 he translated Henri Bergson's Introduction à la metaphysique into Hungarian. He was a member of the so-called Sunday circle around Béla Balázs and György Lukács. With Karl Mannheim, Arnold Hauser and Ervin Szabó he was also involved in the Budapest Free School of Humanities, founded by Lukács. A December 1915 lecture on historical materialism to the Hungarian Philosophical Society criticized economic determinism. His March 1918 lecture to a joint meeting of the Sunday Circle and the Sociological Society, 'Conservative and Progressive Idealism', opposed positivism and associated radical politics with philosophical idealism.

In December 1918 he joined the Hungarian Communist Party and was appointed as editor of Vörös Újság (The Red Journal). In April 1919, speaking as director of the new Marx-Engels Workers' University, he lectured on 'The Philosophic Foundations of the Human Sciences', arguing that socialism needed to be joined to philosophy rather than the natural sciences. He was Director of Higher Education in the Hungarian Soviet Republic. After the Republic fell he emigrated to Vienna, and from 1921 to 1930 lived in Berlin, where he was a member of the Communist Party of Germany. In 1921 he published "Observation on Scientific Education and the Proletariat" in Communist Review. His Introduction to Marx's Philosophy appeared in 1921 or 1922, and in 1923 he reviewed Karl Korsch's Marxism and Philosophy for Die Internationale. In 1923 he lectured, alongside Lukacs, at the Marxist Work Week, out of which later grew the Institute for Social Research.

In 1930 Fogarasi moved to Moscow to work for the Comintern. A Fellow of the Soviet Academy of Sciences, he worked with Eugen Varga, Stalin's economic advisor. In 1945 he returned to Budapest, where he became rector of the University of Economics. He received the Kossuth Prize in 1952. He died in Budapest on 28 April 1959.

== Works ==
- (tr.) Bevezetés a metafizikába [Introduction to metaphysics] by Henri Bergson. Translated from the French into Hungarian. 1910.
- (tr.) Tudomány és vallás : a jelenkori philosophiában [Science and religion: contemporary philosophy] by Émile Boutroux. Translated from the French to Hungarian. 1914.
- Zalai Bela: In Memoriam, Budapest, 1916.
- 'Konservativ és progresszib idealizmus' [Conservative and progressive idealism], Huszadik Század, 19.nos. 1-6 (1918), pp. 193–206.
- 'The Tasks of the Communist Press', 1921. Reprinted in A. Mattelert & S. Sieglaub, eds., Communication and Class Struggle: Volume 1: Capitalism, Imperialism, 1979, pp. 149–52
- Bevezetés a marxi filozófiába [Introduction to Marx's Philosophy], Vienna: Europa Verl, 1921.
- 'Die Soziologie der Intelligenz und die Intelligenz der Soziologie' [Sociology of the Intelligentsia and the Intelligence of Sociology], Unter dem Banner des Marxismus, vol.4, 1930, pp. 356–75. Reprinted in Hans-Joachim Lieber, ed., Ideologienlehre und Wissenssoziologie, pp. 483–504.
- 'Dialektik und Sozialdemokratie' [Dialectics and Social Democracy], Unter dem Banner des Marxismus, 1931, pp. 359–75
- 'Der reaktionäre Idealismus - Die Philosophie des Sozialfaschismus' [Reactionary Idealism: the philosophy of social fascism], Unter dem Banner des Marxismus, Vol. 5, 1931, pp. 214–31
- 'Krisen-Sozialismus', Unter dem Banner des Marxismus, Vol. 8, 1935.
- 'Lenins Lehre von der Arbeiteraristokratie und ihre Anwendung auf Fragen der Gegenwart' [Lenin's theory of the labor aristocracy and its application to contemporary questions], Unter dem Banner des Marxismus, Vol. 9, 1935.
- Marxizmus és Logica [Marxism and Logic], Budapest: Szikra Publisher, 1946
- Logic, 1951. Translated from Hungarian to German by Samuel Szemere as Logik, 1955.
- Materializmus és fizikai idealizmus. Budapest, 1952.
- Tudomány és szocializmus. Budapest, 1956
