= Ideology and Utopia =

1929 book by Karl Mannheim

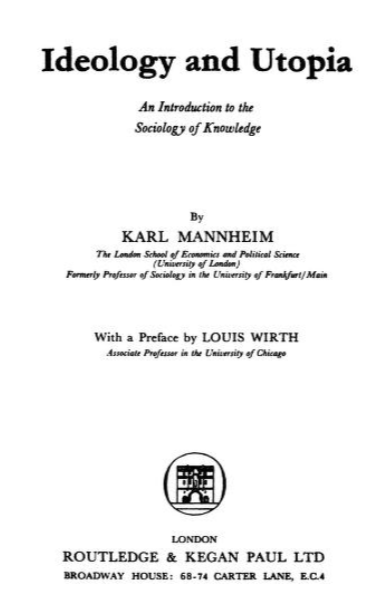
- Title page for Ideology and Utopia
- Author: Karl Mannheim
- Original title: Ideologie und Utopia
- Language: German
- Publication date: 1929
- Text: Ideology and Utopia at Internet Archive

Ideology and Utopia (German: Ideologie und Utopia) is a 1929 book written by Karl Mannheim.

== Overview ==
Mannheim argued that the application of the term ideology ought to be broadened. He traced the history of the term from what he called a "particular" view. This view saw ideology as the perhaps deliberate obscuring of facts. This view gave way to a "total" conception (most notably in Marx), which argued that a whole social group's thought was formed by its social position (e.g. the proletariat's beliefs were conditioned by their relationship to the means of production). However, he called for a further step, which he called a general total conception of ideology, in which it was recognized that everyone's beliefs—including the social scientists'—were a product of the context they were created in. Thus, to Mannheim, "ideas were products of their times and of the social statuses of their proponents."

Mannheim points out social class, location and generation as the greatest determinants of knowledge. Both Mannheim and Georg Lukács were forced into exile after the rise of Horthy as Regent of Hungary. Mannheim chose exile in Germany and was there from 1920 to 1933. He feared this could lead to relativism but proposed the idea of relationism as an antidote. To uphold the distinction, he maintained that the recognition of different perspectives according to differences in time and social location appears arbitrary only to an abstract and disembodied theory of knowledge.

The list of reviewers of the German Ideology and Utopia includes a remarkable roll call of individuals who became famous in exile, after the rise of Hitler: Hannah Arendt, Max Horkheimer, Herbert Marcuse, Paul Tillich, Hans Speier, Günther Stern (aka Günther Anders), Waldemar Gurian, Siegfried Kracauer, Otto Neurath, Karl August Wittfogel, Béla Fogarasi, and Leo Strauss.

Out of all of his works, Mannheim's Ideology and Utopia was the most widely debated book by a living sociologist in Germany during the Weimar Republic. It was first published in German in 1929, with the English publication, Ideology and Utopia, following in 1936. This work has been a standard in American-style international academic sociology, carried by the interest it aroused in the United States.

=== Utopian mentality ===
One of his main ideas regarding utopias is what he considers the "utopian mentality", which Mannheim describes in four ideal types:

1. orgiastic chiliasm
2. liberal humanist utopias
3. the conservative idea
4. modern communism

== See also ==
- Oswald Spengler
- Sociology of knowledge
- Communist utopia
- Utopianism
