= Edith Gyömrői Ludowyk =

Hungarian psychotherapist, poet (1896-1987)

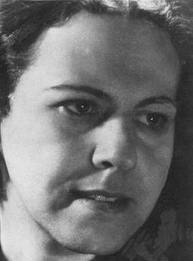

Edith Gyömrői Ludowyk (8 September 1896 – 10 February 1987) was a Hungarian psychotherapist, poet, and communist. She was one of the European Radicals in Sri Lanka, and after moving there in 1938, she married E. F. C. Ludowyk, professor of English at the University College, Colombo.

== Early years ==
Edit (Gelb) Gyömrői was born in Budapest to Mark Gelb (who changed his name to Gyömrői in 1899), a Jewish furniture manufacturer, and Ilona Pfeifer. She had a younger brother, Boris, and an older sister (by two years), Márta.

At her father's request, she began studying interior design, but later dropped out. In 1914, she married chemical engineer Ervin Renyi, with whom she had a son, Gábor, who later died in a fascist labour camp, then divorced him in 1918. Through her uncle István Hollós, she began to learn about psychoanalysis and attended the 5th International Psychoanalytical Congress in Budapest.

== Becoming a communist militant ==
From 1918 onward, she participated in gatherings of the Sunday Circle, a group of left-wing intellectuals which included psychoanalyst René Spitz. In 1919, she worked for the Commissariat for Education during the short-lived Hungarian Soviet Republic.

When the republic fell following the Romanian invasion, she fled to Vienna, where she supported herself by working at a parachute factory, and then as a sales assistant at a bookshop. She knew the Hungarian writers Béla Balázs, composer Hanns Eisler, Czech writer Egon Kisch and Hermann Broch - who translated her poetry into German. Thereafter she was for short periods in Czechoslovakia and Romania. After being expelled from Romania for her communism, she settled in Berlin in 1923, with her second husband Laszlo Tology (Gluck). She designed costumes for the films of Elisabeth Bergner at the Neumann Produktion film studio, translated, interpreted and took photographs. She also worked on the staff of the Rote Hilfe newspaper of the German Communist Party for a time. She studied psychoanalysis from 1924 onwards. After undertaking training analysis with Otto Fenichel, she later practised as an analyst.

She was the therapist of the Hungarian poet Attila József, who wrote his most famous love poems to her.

When Hitler came to power in 1933, Gyömrői emigrated to Prague, due to her being Jewish, along with her political views, which were opposed to the Nazi party ideologies. The following year she returned to Budapest, where she joined the Hungarian Psychoanalytical Society. Between 1936 and 1938, she held seminars and discussion evenings, for mothers and educators on practical educational issues.

== Moving to Sri Lanka ==
In 1938, when Admiral Horthy's fascist regime passed its first Anti-Jewish Law, she emigrated to Sri Lanka with her third husband, journalist Laszlo Ujvári, who died in 1940. She met and married E. F. C. Ludowyk, Professor of English at the University College, Colombo. She joined the Trotskyist Lanka Sama Samaja Party and in 1947, together with Vivienne Goonewardena and several other women of the LSSP, the Bolshevik Samasamaja Party and the Communist Party, she founded the Eksath Kantha Peramuna (United Women's Front), the first autonomous socialist women's association in the country. In 1948, she published an article in The Times of Ceylon titled "Feminism or Socialism?".

In 1956, because the island's humid climate caused her problems, the couple moved to London. There, Gyömrői became a recognized psychoanalyst, and continued her practice until she was 80.

== Death ==
After the death of her husband in 1986, she moved in with her colleagues Anne-Marie and Joseph J. Sandler. She died on 11 February 1987.

== Works ==
- Rényi Edit versei (The Poems of Edit Renyi), 1919
- Versohnung (Atonement)
- Gegen den Strom (Against the Current) 1941
- Miracle and Faith in Early Buddhism, 1944
- Pubertätsriten der Mädchen in einer in Umwandlung begriffenen Gesellschaft (Adolescent Rites among Girls in a Society in Flux), 1955
- Megbékélés, 1979
