= Margit Kaffka =

Hungarian writer

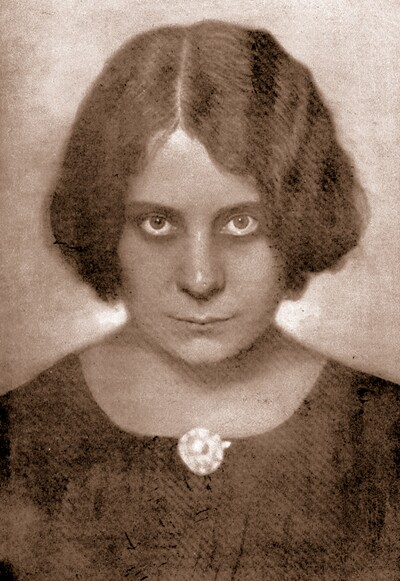
- Born: 10 June 1880; Nagykároly, Kingdom of Hungary, Austria-Hungary
- Died: 1 December 1918 (aged 38); Budapest, First Hungarian Republic
- Resting place: Farkasréti temető, Budapest, Hungary
- Spouse(s): Brunó Fröhlich; Ervin Bauer
- Children: László Fröhlich

Margit Kaffka (10 June 1880 – 1 December 1918) was a Hungarian writer and poet.

Called a "great, great writer" by Endre Ady, she was one of the most important female Hungarian authors, and an important member of the Nyugat generation. Her writing was inspired by József Kiss, Mihály Szabolcska, and the writers' group of the periodical A Hét.

== Personal life ==
Margit Kaffka was born on 10 June 1880 in Nagykároly (today Carei, Romania) into a family of minor Hungarian nobility (see her family's genealogy in Records of the Tötösy de Zepetnek Family). Her father was a public prosecutor, but died early and the family lived under reduced circumstances. She received a scholarship to study at the Sisters of Mercy teacher's training college in Szatmár and in return she taught for one year in Miskolc. She studied in Budapest, receiving a teacher's diploma from the Erzsébet Girls' School. She returned to Miskolc, where she taught literature and economics in a private girls' school, beloved by students. This is the period when her first writings, poems, and novels appeared. She subsequently became a full-time contributor to Nyugat, the most important periodical of the era.

She married Brunó Fröhlich, a forestry officer, on 17 February 1905. In 1907 her husband moved to the Ministry of Agriculture, enabling Kaffka to move away from Miskolc, a town she did not like. However, their marriage became stressed after a few years, and ended in a divorce. Kaffka worked as a teacher in Budapest between 1910 and 1915. During this time, she published her best known work, Színek és évek (1912) (Colors and Years). She married for the second time in 1914 to Ervin Bauer, the younger brother of Béla Balázs. At the beginning of the First World War she left her teaching job to focus full-time on her literary work. She died in the 1918 flu pandemic along with her young son.

== Literature ==
Her works dealt mostly with two main themes: the fall of the gentry, and the physical and spiritual hardships of the independent women in the start of the 20th century. She often wrote about her personal memories of great national crises, the glaring oppositions of the anachronistic society in Hungary.

Her literary career can be divided into three chapters, from 1901 to the start of Nyugat in 1908, the second ending in the start of the war in 1918, and the third marked by the hard years after the war ending in her death.

The year 1912 marked the release of her first, and most important novel, Színek és Évek (Colours and Years) dealing with the fate of the gentry class and women. Her second most famous work is Hangyaboly (The Ant Heap) collecting her memories from the years at the Sisters of Mercy; it was published in 1917.

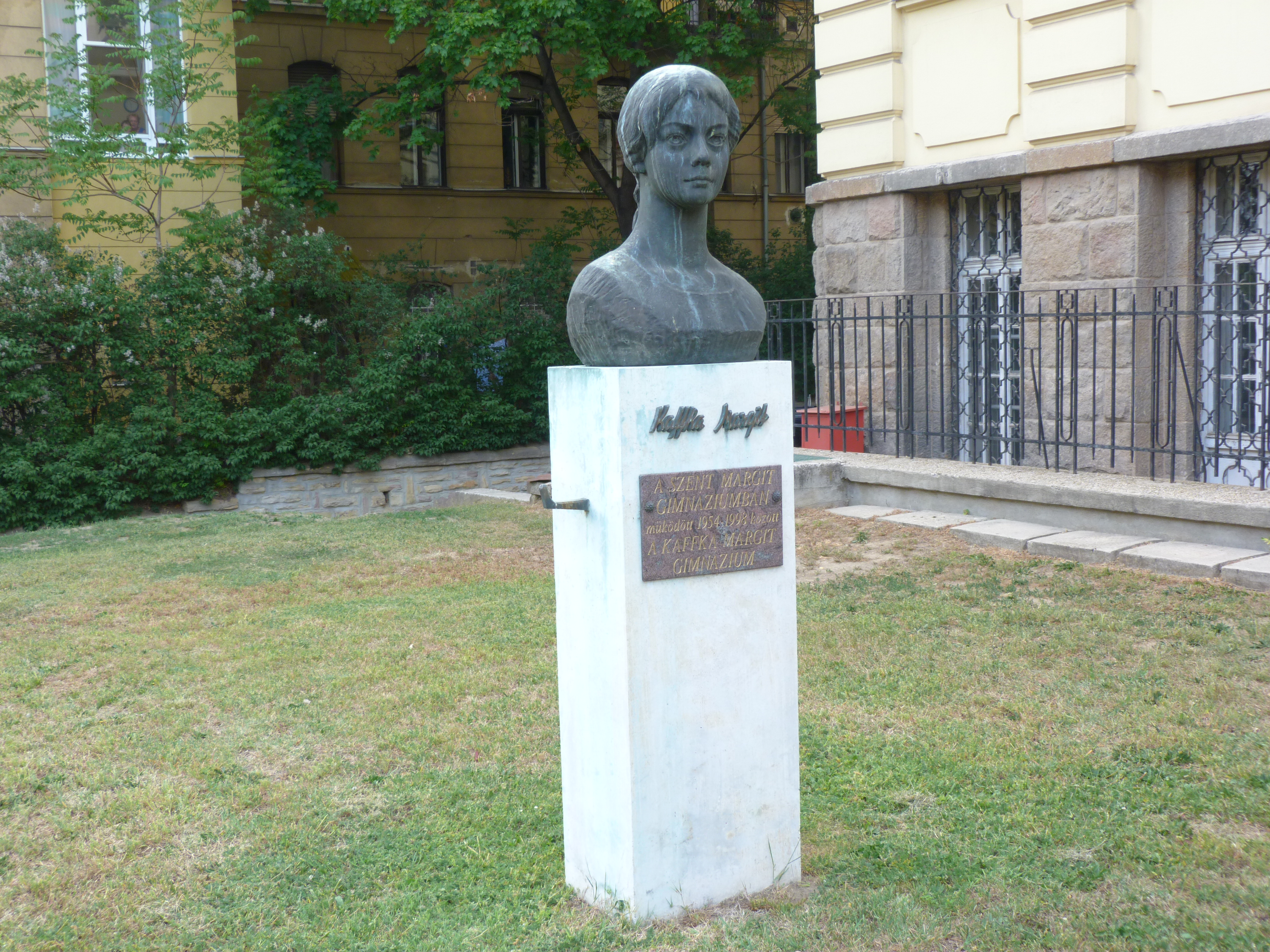
Statue of Margit Kaffka at Budapest

== Major works ==
- Versek (1903)
- Levelek a zárdából (diary novel, 1904)
- A gondolkodók és egyéb elbeszélések (narratives, 1906)
- Csendes válságok (narratives, 1909)
- Képzelet-királyfiak (meseregény, 1909)
- Csendes válságok (narratives, 1910)
- Csonka regény és novellák (narratives, 1911)
- Tallózó évek (poems, 1911)
- Utolszor a lyrán (poems, 1912)
- Süppedő talajon (narratives, 1912)
- Színek és évek (Colours and Years) (novel, 1912)
- Mária évei (novel, 1913)
- Szent Ildefonso bálja (narratives, 1914)
- Két nyár (novel, 1916)
- Állomások (novel, 1917)
- Hangyaboly (The Ant Heap) (novel, 1917)
- Kis emberek barátocskáim (collection of early works, 1918)
- Az élet útján (poems, 1918)
- A révnél (narratives, 1918)

== Sources ==
- Czigány, Lóránt. "Women in Revolt: Margit Kaffka." The Oxford History of Hungarian Literature. Oxford: Clarendon, 1984. 333–36.
- Bodnár, György. Kaffka Margit. Budapest: Balassi, 2001.
- Borgos, Anna, ed. A te színed előtt. Kaffka Margit szerelmei. Budapest: Holnap, 2006.
- Földes, Anna. Kaffka Margit: Pályakép. Budapest: Kossuth, 1987.
- Fülöp, László. Kaffka Margit. Budapest: Gondolat, 1988.
- Horváth, Györgyi. "Női irodalom a magyar századelőn. A női irodalom szerepe Kaffka Margit Színek és évek című regényének kritikai megítélésében". Sárkányfű 4 (1999): 54–66.
- Kádár, Judit. "Feminista nézőpont az irodalomtudományban". Helikon 4 (1994): 407–16.
- Nemeskürty, István, "Kaffka Margit." Diák, írj magyar éneket. A magyar irodalom története 1945-ig. Budapest: Gondolat, 1985. Vol. 2, 698–701.
- Kárpáti, Béla. Miskolci irodalom, irodalom Miskolcon. Miskolc, 1989.
- Simon, Zsuzsanna, ed. A lélek stációi. Kaffka Margit válogatott levelezése. Budapest: Nap, 2010.
- Tötösy de Zepetnek, Steven. "Margit Kaffka and Dorothy Richardson: A Comparison." Hungarian Studies 11.1 (1996): 77–95.
- Tötösy de Zepetnek, Steven. "Kaffka Margit prózája. Az irodalmi feminizmus kezdete Magyarországon". Régi és új peregrináció. Magyarok külföldön, külföldiek Magyarországon. Ed. Imre Békési, József Jankovics, László Kósa, & Judit Nyerges. Budapest: International Association for Hungarian Studies, 1993. Vol. 2, 1185–94.
- Tötösy de Zepetnek, Steven (斯蒂文·托托西演). 文学研究的合法化: 一种新实用主义 ·整体化和经主 义文学与文化研究方法 (Legitimizing the Study of Literature: A New Pragmatism and the Systemic Approach to Literature and Culture). Trans. Ma Jui-ch'i (马瑞琪翻). Beijing: Peking University Press, 1997. 171–93.
- Genealogy of the Kaffka de Tarczafalva Family IN: Tötösy de Zepetnek, Steven. Records of the Tötösy de Zepetnek Family. CLCWeb: Comparative Literature and Culture (Library) (2010-): <https://docs.lib.purdue.edu/clcweblibrary/totosyrecords>.
- Tötösy de Zepetnek, Steven. "Women's Literature and Men Writing about Women". Comparative Literature: Theory, Method, Application. By Steven Tötösy de Zepetnek. Amsterdam: Rodopi, 1998. 174–214.
- Wittmann, Livia K. "Desire in Feminist Narration: Reading Margit Kaffka and Dorothy Richardson." Canadian Review of Comparative Literature / Revue Canadienne de Littérature Comparée 21.3 (1994): 399–415.
