= Frederick Antal =

Hungarian art historian

Frederick Antal (21 December 1887 – 4 April 1954), born Frigyes Antal, later known as Friedrich Antal, was a Hungarian art historian, particularly known for his contributions to the social history of art.

== Early life ==
Antal was born in Budapest to an upper-class Jewish family. After earning a degree in law, he decided to pursue art history. He studied with Heinrich Wölfflin at the University of Berlin before completing his doctorate under Max Dvorák at the University of Vienna. Antal was a member of the Sonntagskreis intellectual group formed in Budapest by Béla Balázs, György Lukács and others in 1915.

== Career ==
He started his career at the Museum of Fine Arts in Budapest with a year as a volunteer from 1914. In 1919, he became its Vorsitzender des Direktoriums (Chairman of the Board) for several months until the White Terror toppled the new Hungarian Soviet Republic and he fled the country.

After a brief sojourn in Vienna, Antal lived in Germany. Until 1923, when he relocated to Berlin. From 1926 to 1934, he was an editor for Kritische Berichte zur kunstgeschichtlichen Literatur, alongside Bruno Fürst. In 1933, he was forced to flee from political upheaval again, as the Nazi Party rose to prominence in Germany. Settling in England, he lectured at the Courtauld Institute of Art in London and wrote. According to a 2012 article in Visual Culture in Britain, "Antal became the leading practitioner of the social history of art in Britain, and a formative influence on Anthony Blunt and John Pope-Hennessy, as well as John Berger."

Lee Sorensen of the Dictionary of Art Historians writes that Antal "increasingly applied the concept of Marxist dialectical materialism to art history", suggesting that "artistic style is primarily an expression of ideology, political beliefs and social class". Criticisms of his work include, according to Sorensen, that it assumes "too strong a determination of artistic style by social constructs" and neglecting the subjectivity of the artist's work in favor of too great an identification with the social class of the artist's sponsor.

== Selected publications ==
- Florentine Painting and its Social Background: The Bourgeois Republic before Cosimo de’ Medici’s Advent to Power: XIV and Early XV Centuries. London, 1948. (Reprint: Harvard University Press, 1986, ISBN 0-674-30668-6)
- Fuseli Studies. London, 1956.
- Hogarth and his Place in European Art. New York: Basic Books, Inc., 1962.
- Classicism and Romanticism, with Other Studies in art history. London: Routledge & Kegan Paul, 1966. [Includes the essay ‘Remarks on the Method of Art History’]
