= Karl Szilárd =

Hungarian-Soviet mathematician

Karl Szilárd was a Hungarian-Soviet mathematician. He made contributions to differential equations, complex analysis, and aerodynamics.

== Early life and education ==
Szilárd was born in 1901 in Győr, the younger brother of Stefánia Szilárd. (The siblings were not related to the physicist Leo Szilard, as is written in some sources).

He studied at Jena and Göttingen. After getting the doctorate degree at Göttingen in 1927 under Richard Courant, he worked in industry.

== Move to Russia and imprisonment ==
A member of the German communist party, in 1934 he emigrated to Russia, following his sister and her husband, the biologist Ervin Bauer, who had emigrated a decade earlier. He worked in the Central Aerohydrodynamic Institute (TsAGI) in Moscow.

Arrested in 1938, he worked in the "sharashka" on the construction of military aircraft. His cellmates included his friend, the famous Russian physicist Yuri Rumer (being released earlier than Rumer, Szilárd helped him to smuggle his scientific writings out of the prison), and the famous aircraft designers Andrei Tupolev and Robert Bartini. According to memoirs of the times, "Karlusha", as he was affectionately called by his colleagues/cellmates, was loved by virtually everybody, including the prison guards.

== Release and rehabilitation ==
He was released in 1948, receiving the Stalin Prize around the same time for his fundamental work on ballistics. After his release, Szilárd again worked for TsAGI and for Referativnyi Zhurnal "Matematika" (a Russian analog of Zentralblatt and Mathematical Reviews, currently defunct). He was formally rehabilitated in 1956.

== Return to Hungary ==
In 1960 he returned to Hungary, resumed his work in mathematics, and headed the Department of Differential Equations of the Institute of Mathematics at Budapest. He facilitated contacts of his former "sharashka" cellmates from the Tupolev construction bureau with the Hungarian airline company.

== Death ==
Szilárd died in 1980.
