= Ritoók =

Ritoók is a surname. Notable people with the surname include:

- Emma Ritoók (1868–1945), Hungarian poet, critic, and philosopher
- Zsigmond Ritoók (1929–2026), Hungarian classical philologist
