= Sonntagskreis =

Discussion group in Budapest, Hungary, 1915–1918

- Vasárnapi Kör
- Formation: 1915
- Dissolved: 1918
- Type: intellectual discussion group
- Legal status: informal
- Location: Budapest, Hungary
- Founding members: Béla Balázs; Lajos Fülep; Arnold Hauser; György Lukács; Karl Mannheim

The Sonntagskreis (Hungarian: Vasárnapi Kör, "Sunday Circle") was an intellectual discussion group in Budapest, Hungary, between 1915 and 1918. The main focus of the group was on the relationship between ideas and the social and historical context of those ideas, a line of thought that led towards the later concepts of "social history of art" and "sociology of knowledge".

== The Sonntagskreis group ==
The Sonntagskreis was founded in the autumn of 1915 by Béla Balázs, Lajos Fülep, Arnold Hauser, György Lukács, and Károly (Karl) Mannheim; in December of that year Balázs noted the success of the group in his diary. Other members of the group at various times included Frigyes (Frederick) Antal, Béla Fogarasi, Tibor Gergely, Edit Gyömrői, Edit Hajós, György Káldor, Juliska Láng, Anna Lesznai, Ernö Lörsi, Mihály (Michael) Polányi, László Radványi, Emma Ritoók, Anna Schlamadinger, Ervin Šinko, Vilmos Szilasi, Károly Tolnay (Charles de Tolnay) and János (Johannes) Wilde. Admission to the group required the assent of all existing members; members could bring guests to meetings. The group generally met on Sunday afternoons at Balázs's flat, and discussed literature and philosophy.

== The Free School of Humanist Studies ==
In the spring of 1917 members of the group founded the Szellemi Tudományok Szabad Iskolájána, or "Free School of Humanist Studies", which for two semesters in 1917 and 1918 organised lectures in a school building in Budapest. Guest lecturers included Béla Bartók, Zoltán Kodály and Ervin Szabó.
