= Stefánia Szilárd =

Hungarian mathematician

Stefánia Szilárd was a Hungarian-Soviet mathematician. She and her husband, Ervin Bauer, emigrated to the USSR in 1925 and were killed during the Great Purge a decade later. Karl Szilárd, also a mathematician, was her younger brother (the two had no relation to Leo Szilard).

Szilárd was born in 1898 in Győr (then Austria-Hungary). She graduated from the Budapest University's Faculty of Physics and Mathematics in 1919, the same year marrying Ervin Bauer, a noted physician and biologist, and a staunch supporter of the short-lived Hungarian Soviet Republic. After the fall of the Republic in 1919, and the ensuing White Terror, the couple fled the country and lived, under hardship conditions, in Göttingen, Prague, and Berlin.

After an invitation to Ervin Bauer by Nikolai Semashko, the Russian Commissar of Public Health of that time, they settled in 1925 in Moscow, moving to Leningrad in 1933. Stefánia's younger brother, Karl Szilárd, followed in 1934. In Moscow the Bauers socialized with other Hungarian emigres, including Máté Zalka, Béla Illés, and Antal Hidas.

Stefánia became a member of the communist party, and worked, together with her husband, at the Leningrad branch of the Institute of Experimental Medicine. According to her contemporaries, she was an able mathematician, but her life apparently was dominated by the life and deeds of her husband, whom she helped in his work in theoretical biology. During her life, she published only two short papers – one in Hungarian in 1917 on number theory, and another one in 1934 (written in German and published in Matematicheskii Sbornik) on complex analysis.

The couple was arrested in August 1937 and shot in January 1938. They are buried in Levashovo Memorial Cemetery. They were both rehabilitated in 1956.

== Family ==
Ervin and Stefánia had three children: Mikhail (born in 1924), Sophia (born in 1928, died of pneumonia at the age of four), and Karl (born in 1934). After their deaths, their two surviving children were separated, given different family names, and sent to orphanages. As an adult Mikhail Bauer served in a labor army and was sent to Barnaul to work in an engineering plant before returning to Leningrad in 1956. He published a memoir in 2003.
