= Lajos Fülep =

Hungarian art historian and philosopher

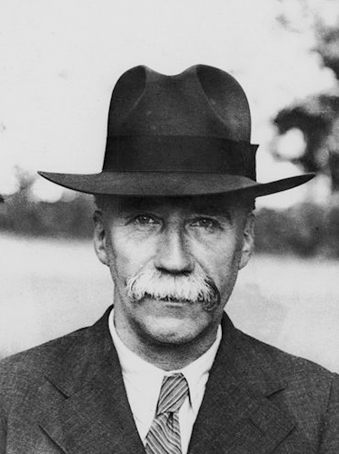
- Fülep in 1943
- Born: January 23, 1885; Budapest, Austria-Hungary
- Died: October 7, 1970 (aged 85); Budapest, Hungarian People's Republic
- Occupations: art historian, philosopher, university professor, pastor
- Spouse: Renée Erdős (1913–1918)
- Awards: Kossuth Prize (1949)

Lajos Fülep (January 23, 1885 – October 7, 1970) was a Hungarian art historian, philosopher of art, pastor of the Reformed Church in Hungary, and university professor.

== Life and career ==
He was born into the family of a veterinarian. Fülep received his primary education in the countryside, and returned to Budapest for university studies. During this period, he wrote articles on art and history for various newspapers, such as Népszava, which made him well-known in intellectual circles.

Fülep traveled to Paris in 1904 and 1906, and from 1907 he studied in Florence on a state scholarship. In Florence, he learned about Renaissance art as well as the thoughts of St. Francis of Assisi, as a result of which Fülep, who had previously been considered an anarchist thinker, was converted to Christianity. He also co-edited the philosophical magazine A Szellem with György Lukács. He moved to Rome for a short time in 1913, and then returned home to Hungary in 1914.

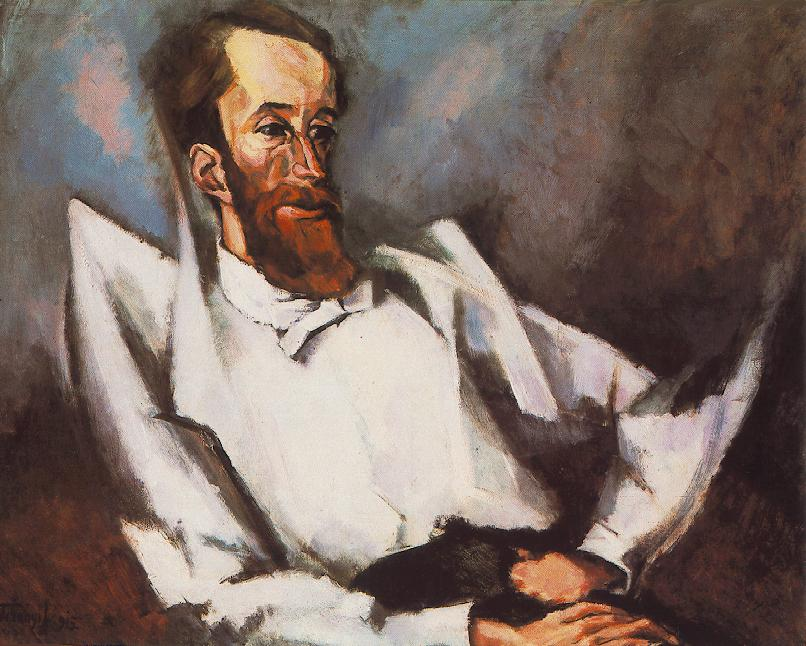
Portrait of Fülep by Lajos Tihanyi

Fülep worked as a high school teacher and then he was appointed the artistic officer of the social policy department of Budapest. In 1915 became a founding member of the Sunday Circle led by Lukács and Béla Balázs.

After the end of the war he was a diplomat in Italy on behalf of the Károlyi government and was not in Hungary during the Aster Revolution. During the Hungarian Soviet Republic, he was appointed as a professor at the University of Budapest. After the fall of the republic, he was removed from the university and went in to voluntary exile where he served as a Reformed pastor.

in the 1930s he was a professor at the University of Pécs, teaching philosophy of art, aesthetics and Italian literature, where his friendship with Sándor Weöres began. In 1930 he received the Baumgarten Prize. In 1934 with Pál Gulyás and László Németh, he started the paper entitled Answer, but left the paper early due to differences in perception.

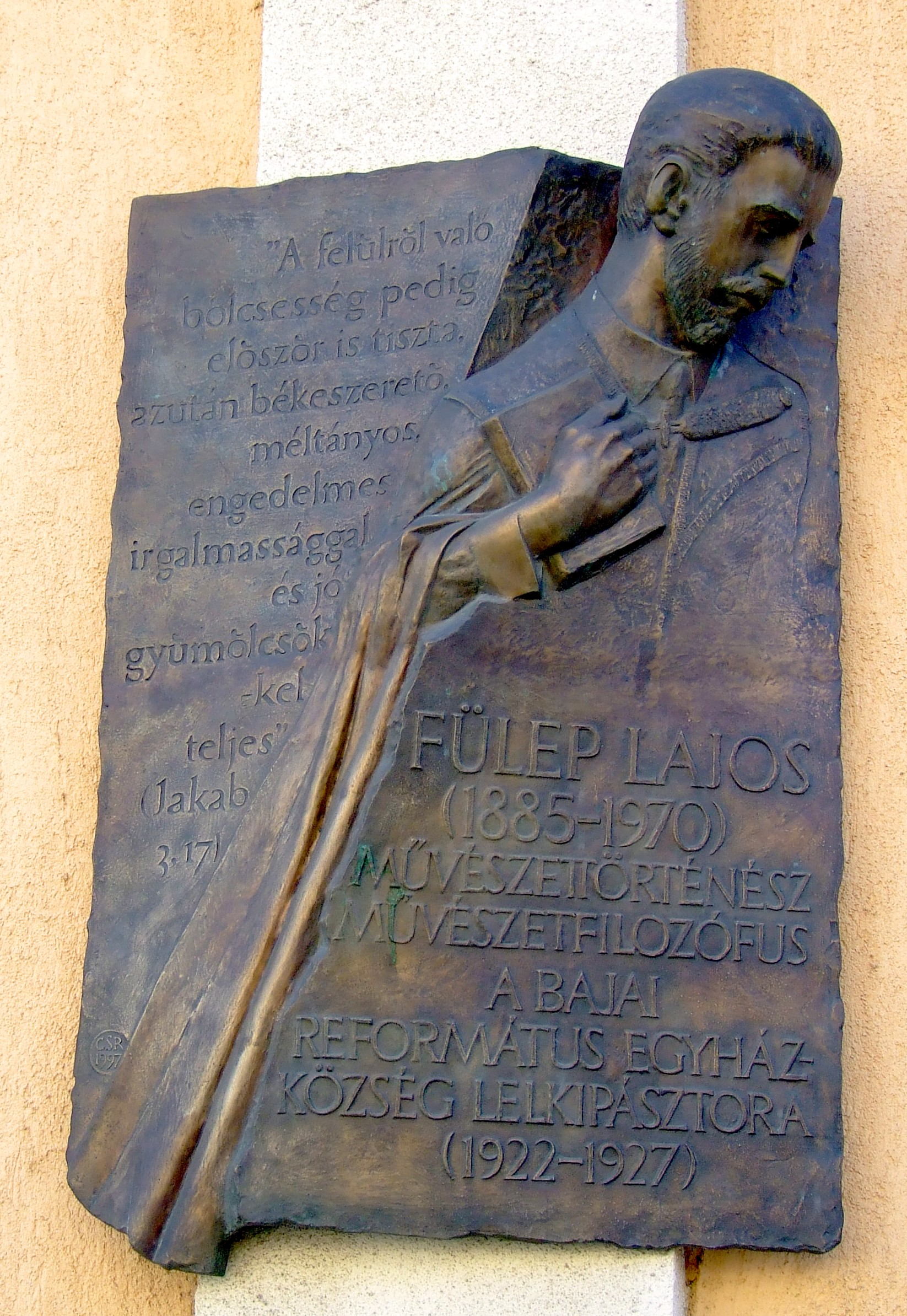
Memorial plaque of Lajos Fülep on the wall of the Reformed Church in Baja.

After the Second World War he was appointed a professor in the Italian department of Pázmány Péter University, and then he moved back to Budapest for a year, where he became a lecturer at the Eötvös Collegium. In 1948 he was elected a corresponding member of the Hungarian Academy of Sciences. Although he did not conform to the official communist cultural policy, his age and his friendship with Lukács gave him protection. At that time, he was appointed head of the Department of Art History at Eötvös Loránd University and held this position for ten years. He was awarded the Kossuth Prize in 1957. During his university work until 1960, he was editor-in-chief of the Art History Bulletin and Acta Historiae Artium.

During the final years of his life, Fülep lived in retirement and continued his writings and research on art, philosophy and history.

== Selected works ==
- Az emlékezés a művészi alkotásban (1911)
- Mai vallásos művészet (1914)
- Donatello problémája (1916)
- Művészet és világnézet (1916–1918; 1923)
- Magyar művészet (Hungarian Art) (1923)
- A művészet forradalmától a nagy forradalomig 1–2 (1974)
- Egybegyűjtött írások. Cikkek, tanulmányok 1902–1908 (1988)
