= Anna Lesznai =

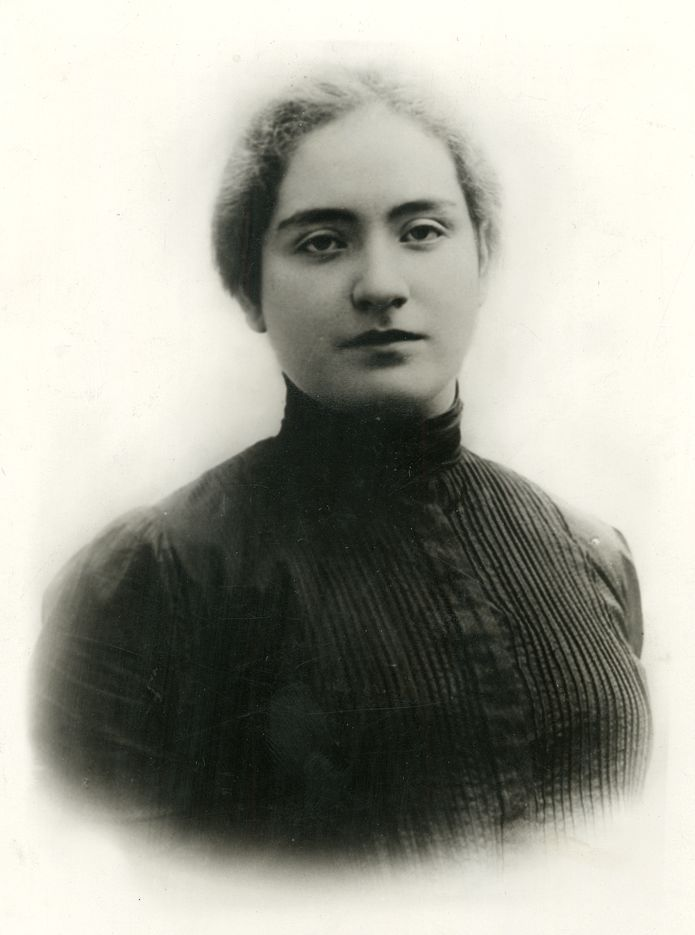
- Anna Lesznai around 1910
- Born: Amália J. Moskowitz; 3 January 1885; Budapest, Austria-Hungary
- Died: 2 October 1966 (aged 81); New York City, United States
- Spouse(s): Oszkár Jászi (m. 1913; div. 1918) Tibor Gergely
- Children: Andrew Jaszi, George Jaszi

Anna Lesznai (3 January 1885 – 2 October 1966) was a Hungarian-born American writer, painter, designer, and key figure in the Hungarian avant-garde.

== Life and work ==
Amália J. Moskowitz (familiarly known as Máli) was born in Budapest. She grew up in Alsókörtvélyes (now Nižný Hrušov, Slovakia) on the country estate belonging to her father Geyza Moskowitz, a physician who had served as personal secretary to Prime Minister Gyula Andrássy. Her mother, Hermina Hatvany, was a member of the Hatvany-Deutsch family, one of the leading ennobled Jewish families of Hungary. The art patron Sándor Hatvany-Deutsch was her uncle, the writer Lajos Hatvany her cousin. She adopted the pen name of Anna Lesznai after the neighboring village of Leszna (today Lesné, Slovakia).

Multi-talented, she was recognized equally for her artwork and her writing. She studied art in Budapest with Károly Ferenczy and Simon Hollósy, later in Paris with Lucien Simon. In 1909 she joined the Constructivist-Expressionist group of Hungarian artists known as Nyolcak (“The Eight”), and in 1911 her work was shown as part of their second exhibition. Her painting and embroideries drew much of their inspiration from Hungarian folklore and folk art.

Lesznai's early published writing includes essays, poetry, and original fairy tales. Beginning in 1908 she was a regular contributor to the literary journal Nyugat. She was also a member of the intellectual discussion group known as the Sonntagskreis (“Sunday Circle”) and maintained close friendships with its two principal founders, Béla Balázs and György Lukács. Both were responsible for her appointment in April 1919, during the Hungarian Republic of Councils, to a position in the Ministry of Education where she was charged with developing a new national arts curriculum.

Defying expectations for women of her time, Lesznai was bohemian in spirit and lifestyle. She married at the age of seventeen, bore a son, and then divorced soon after. In 1913 she married the sociologist and historian Oszkár Jászi, a leading figure in the Hungarian progressive movement and cabinet minister in the Hungarian Democratic Republic. Two sons who were later to become respected intellectuals in the United States resulted from the marriage: economist George Jászi (1915–1992), and the philosopher and Germanist Andrew Jaszi (1917–1998). Anna Lesznai and Oszkár Jászi divorced in 1918 but maintained a close lifelong friendship.

In 1919 Lesznai emigrated to Vienna along with sons George and Andrew and her companion Tibor Gergely (1900–1978), an artist and illustrator fifteen years her junior whom she knew from the Sunday Circle. The couple eventually married and, faced with the rising tide of anti-Semitism in Europe, immigrated to the United States in 1939.

Settling in New York City, Lesznai continued her work in art education, lecturing and teaching classes in Hungarian art and design. In 1946 she opened her own school of painting. Her autobiographical novel Kezdetben volt a kert (“In the Beginning was the Garden”), on which she worked for thirty years, was published in German translation in 1965 and in the original Hungarian the following year. With regard to the recent revival of interest in Lesznai's life and work, Judith Szapor writes: “Young scholars, especially Petra Török and Csilla Markója […] consider the novel a masterpiece and argue that it should be valued equally for its historical sweep as a family saga, the psychological depth of her characters, and as a documentary source of the early-twentieth-century progressive scene it depicts.”

Anna Lesznai died on October 2, 1966, in New York City. A major retrospective of her art was mounted by the Hungarian National Gallery in Budapest in 1976. A permanent exhibition at the Hatvany Lajos Múzeum commemorates her life and work.

== Selected works ==
- The Wanderings of the Little Blue Butterfly in Fairyland, with original drawings by Anna Lesznai. Trans. Caroline Bodóczky. Budapest: Corvina Kiadó 1978. Originally published 1912. ISBN 963 13 0618 6
- "Babonás ézrevételek a mese és a tragédia lélektanához“ [“Superstitious Remarks on the Psychology of Fairy Tales and Tragedy”] in: Nyugat, H. 14 (1918)
- Wahre Märchen aus dem Garten Eden. [“True Fairy Tales from the Garden of Eden”]. Trans. András Hecker and Ilka Russy. Edited and with an afterword by Györgz Fehéri. Berlin: Verlag Das Arsenal, 2008. 129 pages.
- Kezdetben volt a kert [“In the Beginning was the Garden”]. German translation: Spätherbst in Eden, Trans. Ernst Lorsy. Karlsruhe: Stahlberg Verlag. 1965. 677 pages.
- Memoirs (unpublished). Extracts in: Éva Karádi, Erzsébet Vezér [Ed.]: "Georg Lukács, Karl Mannheim und der Sonntagskreis". Frankfurt am Main: Sendler. Pages 129–140.
