= Ernst Lorsy =

Hungarian journalist (1889–1960)

- Born: 28 November 1889; Mezőszilas, Hungary
- Died: 23 August 1960 (aged 70); New York City, United States of America
- Occupations: journalist, and translator

Ernst Lorsy, (in Hungarian: Lorsy Ernő, born 28 November 1889 in Mezőszilas, Hungary – 23 August 1960 in New York City) Hungarian journalist, translator and historian of Jewish descent.

== Life ==
He was born in a Jewish family, the son of Isidor Lorsy and Hermina Ernst. He studied at Hungarian and German universities, and started working as a journalist in 1912 at Pester Lloyd. During the Hungarian Soviet Republic he was a Secretary of Public Education. After the fall of the communists, he immigrated to Vienna, where he worked at Bécsi Magyar Újság. During his emigration he redacted the memoir of Mihály Károlyi (Egy egész világ ellen). In the 1930s he returned to Hungary but because of the political changes he emigrated again, now to France. During the Second World War, when Germany attacked France, he fled to North-Africa (1940), a year later he went to the USA, where he worked as a journalist at several Hungarian newspapers, and also as a translator, and thanks to the Governor of Ohio he was the director of the Cleveland Public Library. He died in 1960.

== Translations ==
- Frigyes Karinthy: Bitte Herr Professor: Szenen aus der Mittelschule (Tanár úr kérem, 1916)
- Lajos Bíró: Die Juden von Bazin (A bazini zsidók, 1921)
- Lajos Bíró: Hotel Imperial: Schauspiel in vier Aufzügen (Hotel Imperial)
- Sándor Bródy: Die Geliebte (A szerető, 1925)
- Sir Galahad (Eckstein-Diener, Berta): Bizánc (Byzanz. Von Kaisern, Engeln und Eunuchen., 1936)
- Józsi Jenő Tersánszky: Die Hasengulasch-Legende (Legenda a nyúlpaprikásról, 1937)
- Hans Habe (Békessy János): Hárman a határon át (Bp., 1937)
- Erich Maria Remarque: Három bajtárs (Drei Kameraden, 1947)
- Anna Lesznai: Spätherbst im Eden (Kezdetben volt a kert, 1965 (postumus edition))

== Sources ==
- Magyar életrajzi lexikon II. (L–Z). Főszerk. Kenyeres Ágnes. Budapest: Akadémiai. 1969.
- "Lorsy Ernő". Petőfi Irodalmi Múzeum.
