= E. F. C. Ludowyk =

Evelyn Frederick Charles Ludowyk
- Born: 1906
- Died: 1985 (aged 78–79)
- Spouse: Edith Gyömrői Ludowyk

Evelyn Frederick Charles Ludowyk (1906–1985) was a Shakespearean scholar, author, playwright, and literary critic, and the first professor of English of the University of Ceylon. He was a Sri Lankan Burgher. He married Hungarian-born psychotherapist Edith Gyömröi.

== Early life and education ==
A member of a prominent Dutch Burgher family, Ludowyk had his secondary education at Wesley College, Colombo and Richmond College, Galle. In 1922 he entered the Ceylon University College and obtained a first class degree in English from the University of London.

He was awarded an English scholarship to study further at Trinity College at the University of Cambridge in 1929. While at Cambridge he was deeply influenced by I. A. Richards and F. R. Leavis. He may have also moved in the same circles as Guy Burgess and Kim Philby through their shared interests in art and left wing politics.

In 1936 he obtained his Doctor of Philosophy from Cambridge, writing a dissertation on "English and English Education in Ceylon".

== Academic career ==
He returned to Ceylon from Cambridge in 1932 and was appointed a Lecturer in English at the Ceylon University College. In 1936 was appointed Professor of English. In 1940 he was also appointed Dean of the Faculty of Arts. When the University College was converted into the University of Ceylon, Ludowyk was appointed its first Professor of English in 1942. He was made the first Dean of Arts in the newly established University in Peradeniya in 1952. Among his students there was the linguistics lecturer and children's writer Chitra Fernando.

In 1956 Ludowyk retired from the University of Ceylon and migrated to the United Kingdom.

== Dramatist and author ==
Ludowyk joined the University College Dramatic Society in 1922. He produced a number of plays after returning from Cambridge. His most well-known production is the play He Comes from Jaffna, which is still staged in Sri Lanka today. He was the producer of many of the productions by the University College Dramatic Society.

He also collaborated with Ediriweera Sarachchandra to produce Kapuwa Kapothi, an adaptation of Nikolai Gogol's play "Marriage" in 1945.

Lyn was a Shakespeare scholar and wrote several seminal books on Shakespeare's plays and major themes as well as several books on the history and religious traditions of Sri Lanka and an autobiography.

== Personal life ==
In 1940 he met and married Edith Gyömröi. In 1956, because the island's humid climate caused Edith problems, the couple moved to Hampstead, London.

Later they settled in LaMarsh in Suffolk. Ludowyk died in Colchester in 1985.

== Works ==
=== Books ===
- Marginal Comments (1945)
- The Footprint of the Buddha (London, 1958)
- The Story of Ceylon (London, 1962)
- Understanding Shakespeare (Cambridge, 1962)
- The Modern History of Ceylon (London, 1966)
- Those Long Afternoons: Childhood in Colonial Ceylon (Colombo, 1989)

=== Plays ===
- He Comes from Jaffna (1933)
