= Renée Erdős =

Hungarian writer (1879–1956)

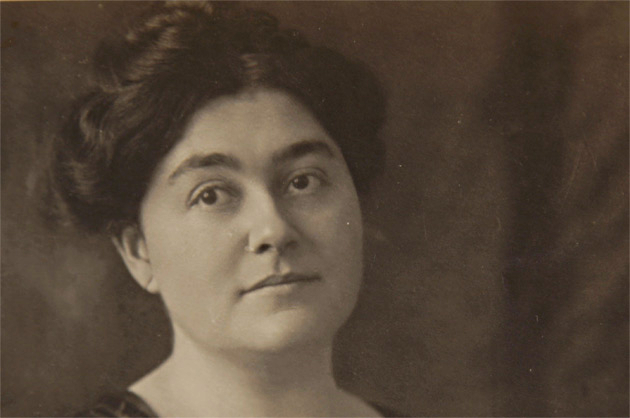
- Renée Erdős around 1910.
- Born: Regina Ehrental; 1879
- Died: 1956 (aged 76–77)
- Occupations: Poet, novelist

Signature
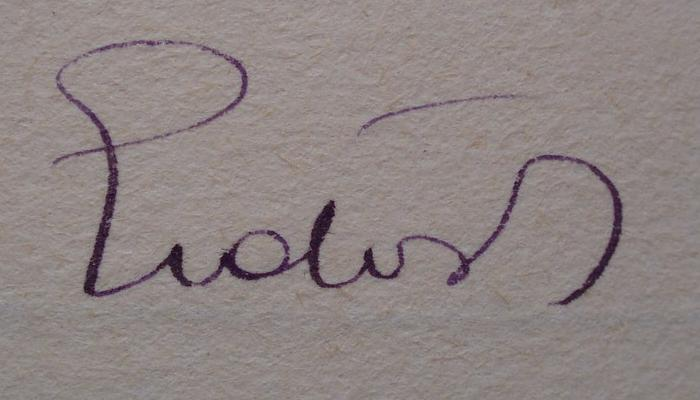

Renée Erdős (1879–1956) was a Hungarian writer of poetry and prose. Her work is noted for its pioneering exploration of female sexuality, and she is considered the first woman in Hungary to make an independent living as a writer.

== Early life ==
Renée Erdős was born Regina Ehrental in 1879. Her family, which was Orthodox Jewish, lived in the rural area of Érseklél, in the Veľké Kosihy area of what was then the Kingdom of Hungary, now part of Slovakia. She then spent her childhood in the Hungarian city of Győr.

In 1896, at age 17, she moved from Győr to Budapest to attend a drama school, but she ended up abandoning her acting aspirations. Instead, after meeting the journalist Marcell Kadosa, she was encouraged to pursue a literary career.

== Writing ==
Erdős began her professional literary career in 1897, writing for the publications Magyar Géniusz and Egyetértés, with Egyetértés writer Károly Eötvös, a prominent lawyer, becoming an important mentor to her. He and other male mentors began to prominently feature her work, with her poetry and short stories appearing in such journals as A Hét and Jövendő.

In this period, she primarily wrote poetry and feuilletons, as well as plays. She published her first book of poetry, Leányálmok ("Girldreams"), in 1899. This was followed by her second poetry collection, Versek ("Poems"), in 1902.

Much of Erdős' work can be characterized as tied to the Secessionist movement. She is particularly known for her erotic poems and other erotic writing. She was a pioneer in exploring women's inner lives and sexuality in Hungary, writing openly about such topics as women's orgasms, contraception, menstruation, and rejecting motherhood. However, she never fully overstepped the bounds of acceptability for Hungarian society at the time. Nevertheless, her erotic poetry drew criticism from reviewers for their lack of "feminine modesty."

Beginning in December 1904, she started her own one-woman journal, called Az írások könyve ("The Book of Writings"), which ran until she left the country for a period in 1906. After returning to Hungary, she began to focus her efforts on writing novels, including the autobiographical novel series Ősök és ivadékok, which began in 1915 with Az új sarj ("New Scion"). This series would go on to include Az élet királynője ("The Queen of Life") in 1920 and Berekesztett utak ("Blocked Ways") in 1923.

Erdős reached the height of her popularity in the 1920s, and her novels sold very well. She wrote prolifically in this period, publishing at least 13 books by 1926. Examples of her successful novels in this period include Santerra bíborsban ("Cardinal Santerra") in 1922, A nagy sikoly ("The Great Scream") in 1923, Teano Amaryll egyszerű élete ("The Simple Life of Amaryll Teano") in 1925, Végzetes vonzalom ("Fatal Attraction") in 1926, Lavinia Tarsin házassága ("The Marriage of Lavinia Tarsin") in 1927, and Brüsszeli csipke ("Brussels Lace") in 1930.

With this financial success, she became the first woman in Hungary to able to make a living from writing. She commanded high prices from publishers for her books and high fees for appearing at events, and she insisted on signing every copy of her work that was sold.

== Personal life ==
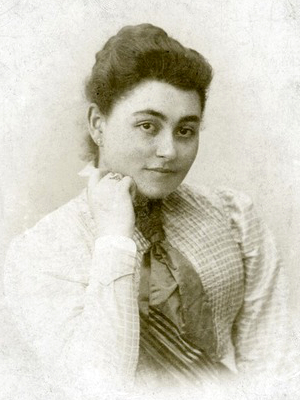
Renée Erdős around 1899.

With her literary earnings, Erdős purchased a villa in Rákoshegy, a village that is now part of Budapest's Rákosmente district.

She had various romantic entanglements, including with fellow writer Sándor Bródy. After her she and Bródy separated and he attempted suicide in 1905, Erdős was branded a "tempting woman", and her career was damaged. She suffered a mental breakdown, diagnosed as neurasthenia, and she was forced to leave Hungary in an attempt to recover her reputation, health, and career. She traveled to Italy, where she entered a convent and converted to Catholicism.

After returning to Hungary, she married the art historian Lajos Fülep in 1913. They had a child together and they later divorced in 1918, just before the birth of their second child. In 1926, she married her second husband, Artúr Lőfler. Ten years her junior, he had previously worked as her secretary. That marriage also eventually ended.

== Death and legacy ==
Her final years were difficult, as she faced increasing prejudice due to her Jewish origins. She was forced to publish under pseudonyms, such as Bálint Réz. In 1944, she had to go into hiding as the Nazis invaded Hungary, and her villa was occupied.

Erdős' final autobiography, Ifjúságunk ("Our Youth"), written in the 1950s, was never published. She died of heart disease in 1956.

Her home in Rákosmente is now a history and art museum, the Renée Erdős House, with a room dedicated to the author.

While her writing was extremely popular in her time, she slipped into obscurity after her death, with her works marketed as fluffy romance novels when they were republished after the end of socialism in Hungary. A book Egy szabad nő ("A Free Woman"), a 2016 fictional biography of her by Anna Menyhért created more interest and became a bestseller.

== Selected works ==
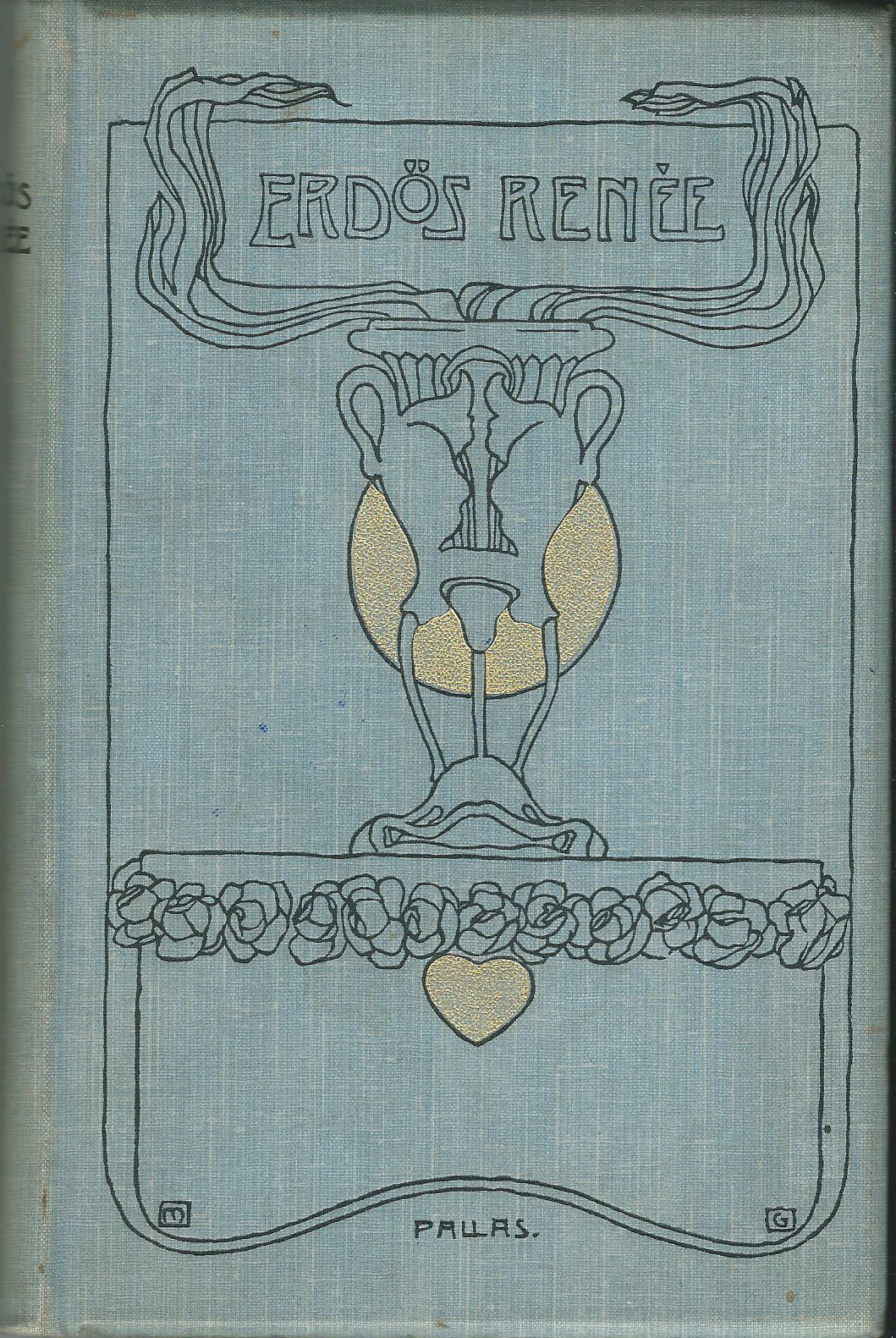
The cover of Erdős' 1902 poetry collection Versek ("Poems").

=== Poetry ===
- Leányálmok, (1899)
- Versek, (1902)
- Jöttem hozzátok.. (1909)
- Aranyveder (1910)
- Sibyllák könyve (1918)
- Egy perccel alkonyat előtt (1921)
- A csukott kert (1945)

=== Novels ===
- Norina (1909)
- Ősök és ivadékok (series of autobiographical novels)
  - Az új sarj (1915)
  - Az élet királynője (1920)
  - Berekesztett utak (1923)
  - Ave Roma (1931)
- Egy szerelmes nyár története (1922)
- Santerra bíboros (1922)
- A nagy sikoly (1923)
- Borsóhercegnő (1924)
- Teano Amaryll egyszerű élete (1925)
- Végzetes vonzalom (1926)
- Lavinia Tarsin házassága (1927)
- Pándy György ifjúsága (1928)
- Brüsszeli csipke (1930)
- Örök papok (1932)
- A csöndes kikötő (1933)
- Szentgyörgyvára (1934)
- Abiság (1935)
- Az asszony, aki ölt (1936)
- Árgirus (1937)
- Timóthy-ház (1938)
- Szemünk fénye (1939)
- Gránátvirág (1945)
