= Theory of generations =

Sociological theory

Timeline of generations in the Western world

Theory of generations (or sociology of generations) is a theory posed by Karl Mannheim in his 1928 essay, "Das Problem der Generationen," and translated into English in 1952 as "The Problem of Generations." This essay has been described as "the most systematic and fully developed" and even "the seminal theoretical treatment of generations as a sociological phenomenon". According to Mannheim, people are significantly influenced by the socio-historical environment (in particular, notable events that involve them actively) of their youth; giving rise, on the basis of shared experience, to social cohorts that in their turn influence events that shape future generations. Because of the historical context in which Mannheim wrote, some critics contend that the theory of generations centers on Western ideas and lacks a broader cultural understanding. Others argue that the theory of generations should be global in scope, due to the increasingly globalized nature of contemporary society.

== Theory ==
Mannheim defined a generation (note that some have suggested that the term cohort is more correct) to distinguish social generations from the kinship (family, blood-related generations) as a group of individuals of similar ages whose members have experienced a noteworthy historical event within a set period of time.

According to Mannheim, social consciousness and perspective of youth reaching maturity in a particular time and place (what he termed "generational location") is significantly influenced by the major historical events of that era (thus becoming a "generation in actuality"). A key point, however, is that this major historical event has to occur, and has to involve the individuals in their young age (thus shaping their lives, as later experiences will tend to receive meaning from those early experiences); a mere chronological contemporaneity is not enough to produce a common generational consciousness. Mannheim in fact stressed that not every generation will develop an original and distinctive consciousness. Whether a generation succeeds in developing a distinctive consciousness is significantly dependent on the pace of social change ("tempo of change").

Mannheim notes also that social change can occur gradually, without the need for major historical events, but those events are more likely to occur in times of accelerated social and cultural change. Mannheim did also note that the members of a generation are internally stratified (by their location, culture, class, etc.), thus they may view different events from different angles and thus are not totally homogenous. Even with the "generation in actuality", there may be differing forms of response to the particular historical situation, thus stratifying by a number of "generational units" (or "social generations").

== Application ==
Mannheim's theory of generations has been applied to explain how important historical, cultural, and political events of the late 1950s and the early 1960s educated youth of the inequalities in American society, such as their involvement along with other generations in the Civil Rights Movement, and have given rise to a belief that those inequalities need to be changed by individual and collective action. This has pushed an influential minority of young people in the United States toward social movement activity. On the other hand, the generation which came of age in the later part of the 1960s and 1970s was much less engaged in social movement activity, because - according to the theory of generations - the events of that era were more conducive to a political orientation stressing individual fulfillment instead of participation in such social movements questioning the status quo.

Other notable applications of Mannheim's theory that illustrate the dynamics of generational change include:

- The effects of the Great Depression in the U.S. on young people's orientations toward work and politics
- How the Nazi regime in Germany affected young Germans' political attitudes
- Collective memories of important historical events that happen during late adolescence or early adulthood
- Changing patterns of civic engagement in the U.S.
- The effects of coming of age during the second-wave feminist movement in the U.S. on feminist identity
- Explaining the rise of same-sex marriage in the United States
- The effects of the Chinese Cultural Revolution on youth political activism

Social generation studies have mainly focused on the youth experience from the perspective of the Western society. "Social generations theory lacks ample consideration of youth outside of the West. Increased empirical attention to non-Western cases corrects the tendency of youth studies to 'other' non-Western youth and provides a more in-depth understanding of the dynamics of reflexive life management." The constraints and opportunities affecting a youth's experiences within particular sociopolitical contexts require research to be done in a wide array of spaces to better reflect the theory and its implications on youth's experiences. Recent works discuss the difficulty of managing generational structures as global processes, proceeding to design glocal structures.

== See also ==
- Generation
- Strauss–Howe generational theory
- Sociology of aging
- Sociology of knowledge
