= Hans Speier =

Hans Speier (February 3, 1905 – February 17, 1990) was a German-American sociologist who worked with the United States Government as a Germany expert both during and after World War II. He was an influence on U.S. foreign policy, helping to establish the RAND Corporation. He also published several books on German politics and culture throughout the middle half of the 20th century.

== Life ==
=== In Germany ===
Speier attended the Helmholtz grammar school in Berlin, where he received his diploma in 1923. At the urging of his father, who was rattled by inflation, he began training as a banker, during which he heard lectures at the Friedrich-Wilhelm University during lunch before the actually intended studies. After one year he abandoned being a banker, and continued his tutoring in math, politics, and history on free mornings before his philosophy studies.

After 1925, Speier majored in sociology and Economics and minored in philosophy and history at the University of Heidelberg. He received his doctorate after six semesters in 1929 with a dissertation on the philosophy of history. He was the first PhD student of sociologist Karl Mannheim, whom he periodically studied with. Speier spent most of his time with Emil Lederer, whose assistant was already employed as a student.

With support of Rudolf Hilferding (a friend of Lederer), Speier was appointed as editor of social sciences at the Ullstein-Verlag in Berlin in 1929. He served as Professor of sociology at the Deutsche Hochschule für Politik in 1931, and was also active in the worker education of the SPD. In 1932 he was also the assistant of Emil Lederer at the Friedrich-Wilhelm University. The Deutsche Hochschule für Politik was closed by the Nazis. His wife, Luise, lost her position as a public health doctor in the Wedding neighborhood of Berlin, because she was Jewish. In September 1933, he emigrated to the United States and followed his teacher Emil Lederer. His wife followed with his daughter in October 1933.

=== In the United States ===
Now living in New York, from 1933 to 1942 and from 1947 to 1948, he was Professor of political sociology at New School for Social Research. During the second world war and in the post-war years he worked only as a propaganda specialist; and then as Germany expert for the U.S. Government. Speier also lectured at the University of Illinois (1941) and the University of Michigan (1941). In 1948, he became the first Director of the Social Science Department of the RAND Corporation, a position he held for almost 15 years. In 1959, he was elected to the American Academy of Arts and Sciences. From 1969 to 1973, he followed Robert M. MacIver as professor of sociology and government at the University of Massachusetts at Amherst. In 1976, he returned as a visiting professor at the New School for Social Research. He lived in Hartsdale, New York with his second wife, Margit Klein Speier, and died during a Sarasota, Florida vacation.

== Sociological work ==
Throughout Speier's academic life he was constantly concerned with the knowledge of sociology and intellectual sociology, in particular was Marxism. In the 1930s, he also worked as a staff sociologist. However, his original investigation with the staff was never released because objective writing on Nazism could no longer be published in 1933. Several chapters appeared in 1939 as a mimeographed edition in English. The complete book was not published in Germany until 1977, and an English translation was not published until 1986. After the emigration itself, Speier increasingly engaged in issues of militarism and posts prior to the sociology of war.

== Works by Speier ==
- "Die Geschichtsphilosophie Lassalles", in Archiv für Sozialwissenschaft und Sozialpolitik 61, 1929, S. 103–127 (= Dissertation, Textildruck)
- Social Order and the Risks of War. Papers in Political Sociology. New York, Stewart 1952.
- Divided Berlin. The Anatomy of Soviet Political Blackmail. New York, Praeger 1961.
- Force and Folly. Essays on Foreign Affairs and the History of Ideas. Cambridge, Mass.: M.I.T. Press 1969
- Witz und Politik. Essay über die Macht und das Lachen. Osnabrück/Zürich, Edition Interfrom 1975.
- German White-Collar Workers and the Rise of Hitler. New Haven, Yale University Press 1986.
- From the Ashes of Disgrace. A Journal from Germany 1945–1955. Amherst, University of Massachusetts Press 1981.
- The Truth in Hell and Other Essays on Politics and Culture 1935–1987. New York, Oxford University Press 1989.
- Die Intellektuellen und die moderne Gesellschaft. Herausgegeben und eingeleitet von Robert Jackall. Graz, Wien, Nausner & Nausner 2007.
