= Chitra Fernando =

Sri Lankan writer

- Born: 1935; Kalutara, Sri Lanka
- Died: 1998 (aged 62–63)
- Occupations: writer and academic

Chitra Fernando (1935–1998) was a writer of short stories and children's literature from Sri Lanka. She was born in the city of Kalutara in southern Sri Lanka.

== Education and teaching ==
Fernando was educated successively at Visakha Vidyalaya, a Buddhist school for girls in Bandarawela, at Balika Maha Vidyalaya in Kalutara, and at the University of Ceylon in Peradeniya, which she entered with an exhibition in history. Her university teachers included Professor E. F. C. Ludowyk, Dr H. A. Passe, Doric de Souza and Robin Mayhead. She graduated from Peradeniya in 1959 with an honours degree in English.

From May 1958 to April 1960 Fernando taught English at Visakha Vidyalaya, but resigned in 1960 to join the staff of the University of Ceylon at Peradeniya as a temporary assistant lecturer in the Literature Department. A scholarship took her to Australia in 1961, where she gained an MA and PhD at the universities of Sydney and Macquarie. She then lectured at Macquarie in linguistics. Her two main academic studies were "English and Sinhala Bilingualism in Sri Lanka" (1977) and "Towards a Definition of Idiom, its Nature and Function" (1978).

== Writings ==
Fernando's books of stories for children are all set in Sri Lanka. They include Glass Bangles (1968), The Adventures of Senerat Bandara and Bempi Appu (both 1972). She also wrote a collection of stories for adults, Three Women (1983), and a novella, Between Worlds (1988). Meanwhile she co-edited with Ranjini Obeyesekere An Anthology of Modern Writing from Sri Lanka (1981).

Between Worlds, in looking at East-West tensions and individual and national identity, "focuses on the traditional woman, the rebel, and the young Asian who has migrated to the West," with a modernized, westernized outlook. Her tales for children often bring an ironic humour to folk tales by setting them in a Sinhalese domestic setting.
