= Emma Ritoók =

Hungarian writer

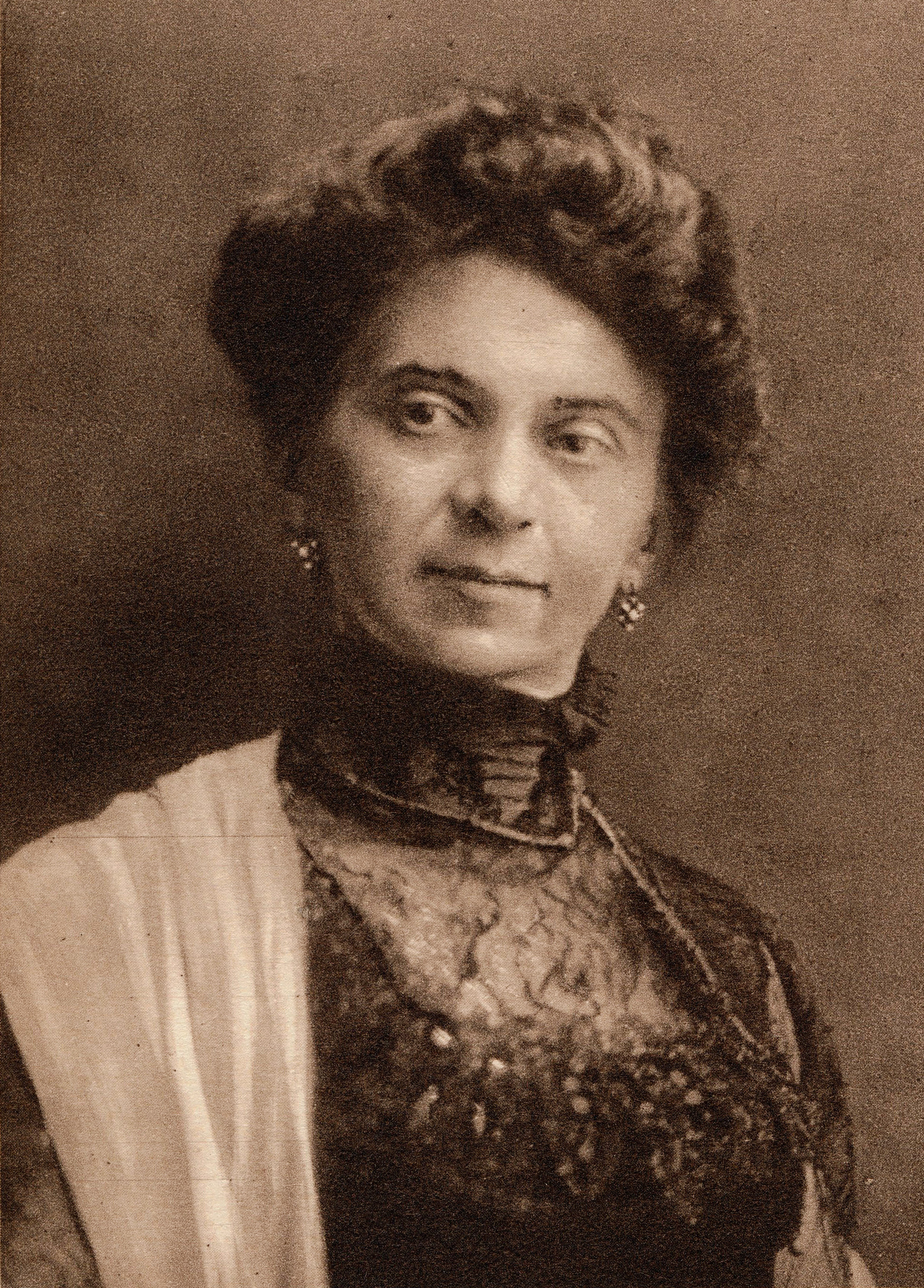
- Ritoók in 1915
- Born: 15 July 1868; Nagyvárad, Austria-Hungary
- Died: 3 April 1945 (aged 76); Budapest, Hungary
- Other names: Ritoók Emma
- Occupation: Poet • Critic • Philosopher

Emma Ritoók or Ritoók Emma (15 July 1868 – 3 April 1945) was a poet, critic and philosopher.

== Biography ==
Emman Ritoók was born in Nagyvárad in what was then Austria-Hungary, and is now Oradea in Romania. Ritoók studied in Budapest, Leipzig and Paris and in 1906 she obtained a doctorate in philology. She was a librarian at the Capital Library. In 1897 she won a science competition prize ( A természettudományi irány a szépirodalomban The natural science trend in fiction) of the Szigligeti Társaság of Nagyvárad. In 1905 she distinguished herself with her winning novel Egyenes úton - egyedül . She translated from Scandinavian writers Bjørnstjerne Bjørnson, Knut Hamsun. She was a member of the Budapest philosophical discussion group "Sunday Circle".

She died in Budapest, Hungary in 1945.

== Works ==
- Egyenes úton - egyedül (romano, Bp., 1905);
- Arany János elmélete az eposzról (study, Bp., 1906);
- A nagy véletlen (romano, Bp., 1909);
- Négyen a tűz körül (stories, Bp., 1911);
- Ellenséges világ (stories, Bp., 1911);
- Sőtét hónapok (poems, Bp., 1920);
- A szellem kalandorai (I - II., Romano, Bp., 1921);
- Pán megváltása (Mistery Game, Bp., 1929);
- Gyárfás Sándor két élete (Roman, Bp., 1933).
