= Ervin Bauer =

Hungarian biologist

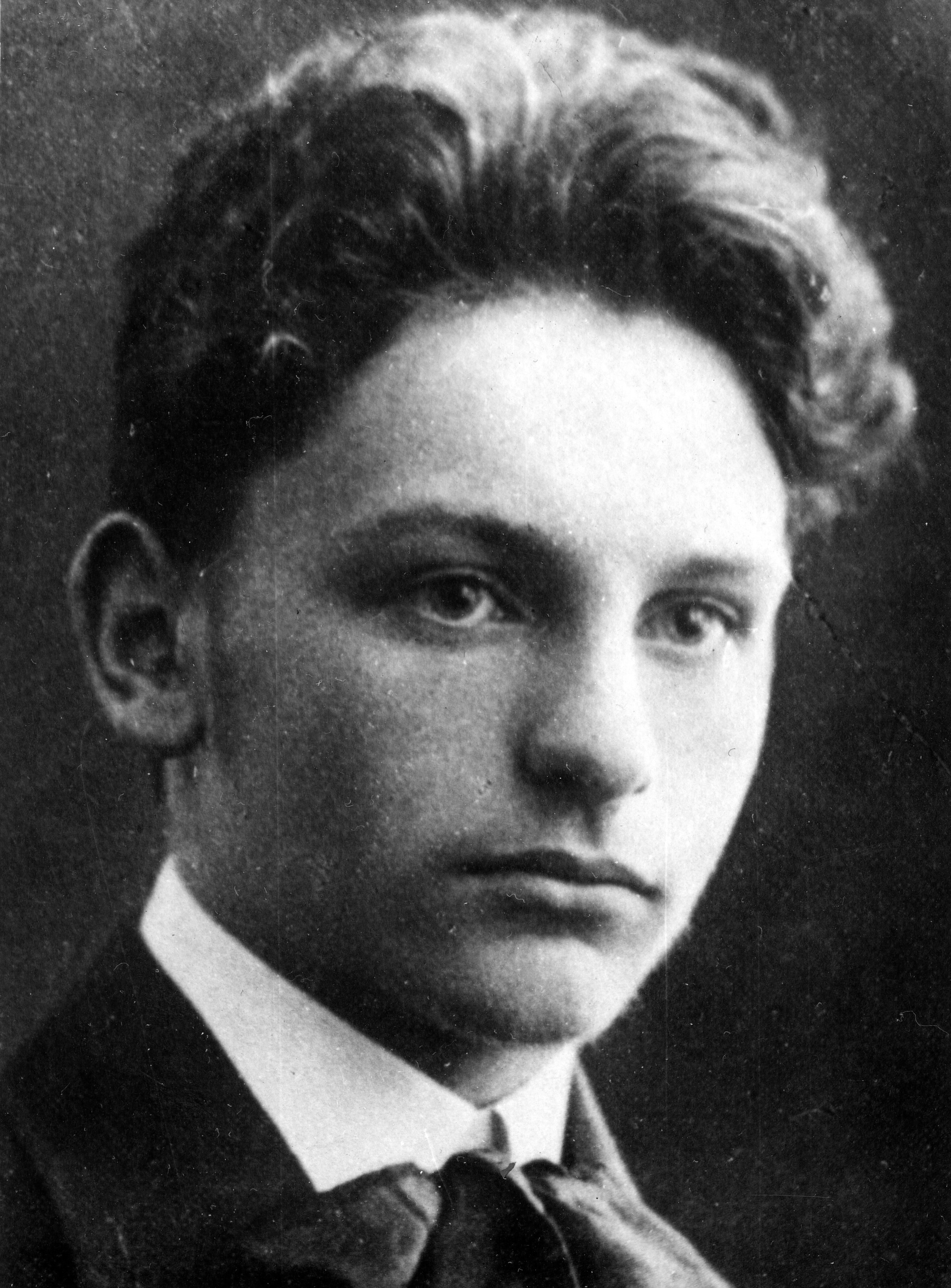
- Ervin Bauer in 1908
- Born: 19 October 1890; Lőcse, Kingdom of Hungary, Austria-Hungary (today Levoča, Slovakia)
- Died: 11 January 1938 (aged 47); Leningrad, Soviet Union
- Education: University of Göttingen
- Known for: formulation of the basic principles of theoretical biology
- Scientific career
- Fields: Theoretical biology, Physiology, Pathology
- Workplaces: Institute of Experimental Medicine, Leningrad, Soviet Union

Ervin Bauer (19 October 1890, Lőcse, Hungary, Austria-Hungary – 11 January 1938, Leningrad, Soviet Union) was a Hungarian biologist. He developed the first detailed concept of theoretical biology from the standpoint of biophysics and bioenergetics. He is also known for his work in pathology. A communist, Bauer emigrated to the Soviet Union in 1925 and was murdered in the Great Purge in 1938.

== Biography ==
Ervin Bauer was born on October 19, 1890, in a family of teachers. He was the younger brother of Béla Balázs. He studied medicine in Budapest, then worked in Hungary, Austria, Germany, Czechoslovakia, again in Germany, and finally in the USSR. In 1920, when working in Göttingen, he formulated his concept of the sustainable non-equilibrium of the living being in an article (English translation) and then in his first monograph. In 1921, Bauer moved to Prague, where, thanks to the patronage of Wilhelm Roux, he worked at the Institute of General Biology at Charles University. In 1923, Bauer moved to Berlin, where he proposed the dependence of tumour growth on the surface tension of embryonic lymph cells and lymph nodes.

In 1925 Ervin Bauer moved to Soviet Union, where he worked in Moscow at the Institute of Professional Diseases named after V. Obukh, then in the Biological Institute named after K.A. Timiryazev, and at the Second Moscow Medical Institute. From 1933 Bauer lived and worked in Leningrad at the All-Union Institute of Experimental Medicine (VIEM), where he was head of the department of general biology. In 1935, Ervin Bauer published a monograph Theoretical Biology, in which he described the general thermodynamic features of living systems. His writings became influential for the development of theoretical biology.

Ervin Bauer's first wife was a writer Margit Kaffka (who died from Spanish flu in 1918), and his second wife was a mathematician Stefánia Szilárd. Bauer and his wife Stefánia were arrested by NKVD on 4 August 1937, and both were shot on 11 January 1938. Their two children were separated and sent to orphanages. Their publications were banned, and it took years before they could be reprinted.

== Research ==
Ervin Bauer formulated the principle of the sustainable non-equilibrium state which he considered as the basic characteristics of living matter: “The living systems are never in equilibrium; at the expense of their free energy they constantly perform work to avoid the equilibrium required by the laws of physics and chemistry under existing external conditions”.

Bauer's principle is incorporated into the non-linear thermodynamics of irreversible processes. Living systems in this framework cannot support their organization only due to the influx of external energy, i.e. the ordering internal factor is involved. The activity of a living system is fully determined by the internal pattern of its non-equilibrium state, and any work performed by the biological system appears as the work of its structural forces. The process of evolution, according to Bauer, corresponds to the increase in external work, which aims to exploit additional resources to maintain the living state of evolving biosystems.
