= Karl Mannheim =

Hungarian sociologist (1893–1947)

- Mannheim c. 1943
- Born: Károly Manheim; 27 March 1893; Budapest, Austria-Hungary
- Died: 9 January 1947 (aged 53); London, England
- Education: University of Budapest (PhD); London School of Economics; Heidelberg University
- Known for: Sociology of culture; Sociology of knowledge; Theory of ideology; Relationism; Free-floating intellectuals
- Spouse: Julia Mannheim-Láng (née Júlia Károlyné)
- Scientific career
- Doctoral students: Franz Neumann

Karl Mannheim (born Károly Manheim, 27 March 1893 – 9 January 1947) was a Hungarian sociologist and a key figure in classical sociology as well as one of the founders of the sociology of knowledge. Mannheim is best known for his book Ideology and Utopia (1929/1936), in which he distinguishes between partial and total ideologies, the latter representing comprehensive worldviews distinctive to particular social groups, and also between ideologies that provide support for existing social arrangements, and utopias, which look to the future and propose a transformation of society.

== Biography ==
=== Childhood and education ===
Karl Mannheim was born 27 March 1893 in Budapest, to a Hungarian father, a textile merchant, and German mother, both of Jewish descent. His early education was in that city, he studied philosophy and literature at the University of Budapest, though he also went to Berlin (where he studied with Georg Simmel) and Paris to further his education, returning to Hungary around the start of the First World War. He obtained a PhD from the University of Budapest, and further qualifications from the University of Heidelberg.

=== Academic career ===
During the War he was involved in a number of influential intellectual circles: the Galileo Circle founded by Karl Polanyi in which Michael Polanyi also participated, the Social Science Association organised by Oscar Jászi, and the Sonntagskreis or 'Sunday Circle' led by György Lukács. In the brief period of the Hungarian Soviet Republic, in 1919, Mannheim taught in the Pedagogical Institute of the University of Budapest thanks to the patronage of his friend and mentor Lukács, whose political conversion to communism he did not share. Both Mannheim and Lukács were forced into exile after the rise of Horthy as Regent of Hungary. Mannheim chose exile in Germany and was there from 1920 to 1933.

In 1921, he married psychologist Juliska Károlyné Lang, better known as Julia Lang. Though she is often unacknowledged, Lang collaborated with Mannheim on many of his works, and along with a number of Mannheim's students, put together many of his works to be published posthumously.

After an unsuccessful attempt to gain a sponsor to teach philosophy in Heidelberg, Mannheim began work in 1924 under the German sociologist Alfred Weber, the brother of well-known sociologist Max Weber, and Emil Lederer. In 1926, Mannheim had his habilitation accepted by the faculty of social sciences, thus satisfying the requirements to teach classes in sociology at Heidelberg. Mannheim was chosen over other competitors for the post, one of whom was Walter Benjamin. From 1929 to 1933, he served as a professor of sociology and political economy at the Goethe University Frankfurt. Norbert Elias and Hans Gerth worked as his assistants from spring 1930 until spring 1933, with Elias as the senior partner. Greta Kuckhoff, who later became a prominent figure in the DDR, was his administrative assistant in Frankfurt, leaving early in 1933 to study at the London School of Economics (LSE) and prepare for Mannheim's emigration there.

In 1933, Mannheim was ousted from his professorship under the terms of the anti-Semitic law to purge the civil service and was forced into exile. After fleeing the Nazi regime and settling in Britain, Mannheim became a lecturer in sociology at the London School of Economics, under a program to assist academic exiles.

In 1941, Sir Fred Clarke, Director of the Institute of Education at the University of London, invited him to teach sociology at the institute on a part-time basis in conjunction with his declining role at LSE under wartime conditions. In January 1946 he was appointed as the first sociology professor at the Institute of Education, a position he held until his death in London a year later. During his time in England, Mannheim played a prominent role in 'The Moot', a Christian discussion group of which T.S. Eliot was also a member, concerned with the role of religion and culture in society, which was convened by J. H. Oldham. He also gained a position of influence through his editorship of the Routledge International Library of Sociology and Social Reconstruction (later the International Library of Sociology).

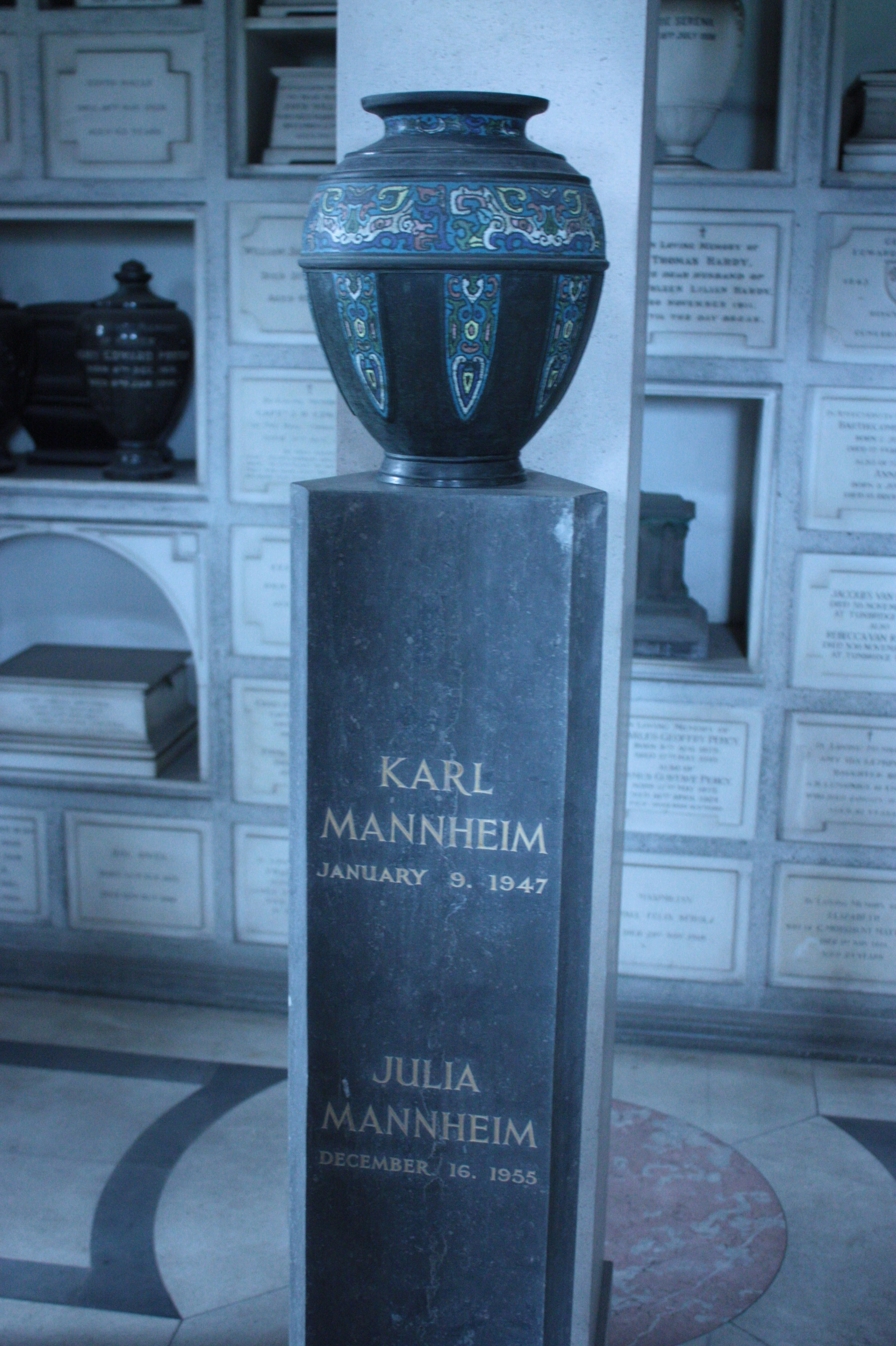
Monument to Karl Mannheim in Golders Green Columbarium, part of Golders Green Crematorium

Mannheim's life, one of intellectual and geographical migration, falls into three main phases: Hungarian (to 1919), German (1919–1933), British (1933–1947). He sought variously to synthesize elements derived from German historicism, Marxism, phenomenology, sociology, and Anglo-American pragmatism. Among his sources of inspiration were György Lukács, Oszkár Jászi, Georg Simmel, Martin Heidegger, Edmund Husserl, Karl Marx, Alfred and Max Weber, Max Scheler, and Wilhelm Dilthey.

=== Death ===
Mannheim died in London on January 9, 1947, at the age of 53 due to a congenitally weak heart. Shortly before his death, he was invited to be director of UNESCO, an offer he was unfortunately not able to accept. He was cremated at Golders Green Crematorium and his ashes were placed in the columbarium there in an urn, and later mixed with those of his wife. He was originally placed opposite Sigmund Freud as a planned pairing, but Freud was later relocated.

== Sociological work ==
=== Hungarian phase (1919) ===
Mannheim was a precocious scholar and an accepted member of several influential intellectual circles in Budapest. In the autumn of 1915, he was the youngest founding member of the Sonntagskreis (Sunday Circle) alongside Béla Balázs, Lajos Fülep, and György Lukács, where a wide range of literary and philosophical topics were discussed. Some discussion focused on the enthusiasms of German diagnosticians of cultural crisis, but also the novels of Fyodor Dostoyevsky and the writings of Søren Kierkegaard and the German mystics. He also participated in the Social Science Association, which was founded by Oszkár Jászi in 1919 and was interested above all in French and English sociological writings. Mannheim's Hungarian writings, notably his doctoral dissertation "Structural Analysis of Epistemology", anticipate his lifelong search for "synthesis" between these currents.

According to sociologist Brian Longhurst, the Sonntagskreis "rejected any 'positivist' or 'mechanist' understanding of society and was dissatisfied with the existing political arrangements in Hungary. The way forward was seen to be through the spiritual renewal entailed in a revolution in culture". The group members were discontented with the political and intellectual composition of Hungary, but "they rejected a materialist Marxist critique of this society. Hungary was to be changed by a spiritual renewal led by those who had reached a significant level of cultural awareness". Yet they did not exclude Marxist themes and Mannheim's work was influenced by Lukács's later turn to Marxism; for example, he credits Marx as a key source of the sociology of knowledge.

=== German phase (1919–1933) ===
In this second phase, Mannheim turned from philosophy to sociology, to inquire into the roots of culture. In the early part of his stay in Germany, Mannheim published his doctoral dissertation "Structural Epistemology of Knowledge", which discusses his theory of the structure of epistemology, the "relations between the knower, the known and the to be known... for Mannheim based on psychology, logic and ontology". Sociologist Brian Longhurst noted that Mannheim's work on epistemology represented the height of his early "idealist" phase and transition to hermeneutic "issues of interpretation within culture".

In this essay, Mannheim introduces "the hermeneutic problem of the relationship between the whole and the parts". He considers the differences between art, the natural sciences, and philosophy "with respect to truth claims", stating that science always tries to disprove one theory, where art never does this and can coexist in more than one worldview; philosophy falls in between the two extremes. Mannheim posits the "danger of relativism", in which the historical process yields cultural products: "if thought to be relative to a historical period, it may be unavailable to a historical period".

Mannheim's ambitious attempt to promote a comprehensive sociological analysis of the structures of knowledge was treated with suspicion by some members of the Frankfurt School, based in the Institute for Marxism directed by Max Horkheimer. They saw the rising popularity of the sociology of knowledge as neutralization and betrayal of Marxism. Arguments between Mannheim and Horkheimer played out in faculty forums, like the Kant Gesellschaft and Paul Tillich's Christian Socialist discussion group.

Horkheimer's Institute at the time was best known for the empirical work it encouraged, and several of Mannheim's doctoral students used its resources. While the conflict between Mannheim, Adorno and Horkheimer looms large in retrospect, Mannheim's most active contemporary competitors were in fact other academic sociologists, notably the proto-fascist Leipzig professor Hans Freyer, and the proponent of formal sociology and leading figure in the profession at the time, Leopold von Wiese.

==== Theory of the sociology and of knowledge, sociology of culture ====
Mannheim's theory on the sociology of knowledge is based on some of the epistemological discoveries of Immanuel Kant. Sociology of knowledge is known as a section of the greater field known as the sociology of culture. Sociology of culture is defined as study of the relationship between culture and society.

There are two main branches of sociology of culture: a moderate branch and a radical branch. The moderate branch is represented by Max Scheler, who believed that social conditions do not affect the content of knowledge. The radical branch, on the contrary, highlighted that society is determined by all aspects of culture. When it came to the sociology of knowledge, Mannheim believed that it established a dependence of knowledge on social reality. Though Mannheim was far from being a Marxist, sociology of knowledge was largely based on Marx's theories regarding classes.

Mannheim's central question of the sociology of knowledge, which tried to understand the relationship between society and knowledge, demonstrated his endeavors to solve the issue of "historical nature and unity of mind and life." Mannheim affirmed the sociology of knowledge as an "extrinsic interpretation and sets apart from the immanent interpretation of thought products." The immanent interpretation is based on one's understanding of intellectual content, which is limited to theoretical content of knowledge and the extrinsic interpretation is based on the capability to understand manifestations.

Knowing the difference between these two types of interpretations helped Mannheim create a place for the sociology of knowledge in the scientific system, thus leaving the sociology of knowledge to stand opposite of the traditional human sciences and to interpret knowledge through an exploration of social reality. Mannheim claimed that the sociology of knowledge has to be understood as the visionary expression of "historical experience which has social reality at its vital center."

In 1920, a series of his essays were published in Germany under the name Essays in Sociology of Knowledge. These essays focused on the search for the meaning behind social reality, the notion of "truth" and the role of the empirical intellectual in search for these truths. Another collection of his essays, Essays in Sociology of Culture, was posthumously published in 1956. It basically served to merge his concern with social reality and democracy. According to Mannheim, ideology was linked to a notion of reality, meanwhile culture focuses more so on the mind of the individual and how it perceives that reality, both, however, "still concerned with the role of the intelligentsia."

==== Ideology and Utopia (1929) ====
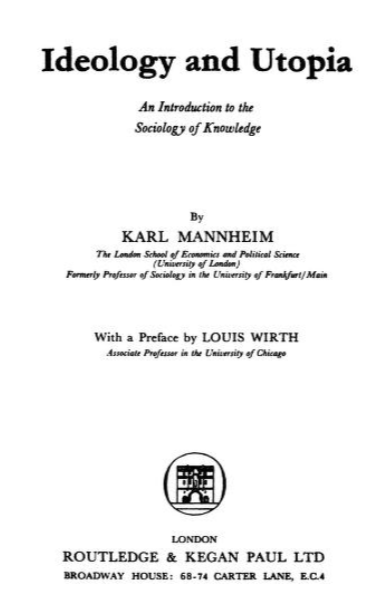
Title page for Ideology and Utopia

Ideology and Utopia (German: Ideologie und Utopia) is a 1929 book written by Karl Mannheim.

==== Mannheim and macro-sociology ====
Mannheim's work was written mostly through a macrosociological lens. While writing Ideology and Utopia Mannheim's fundamental questions were "why does man behave differently in the framework of different social group and class structures". In answering this question, his intellectual contribution to sociology was focused more on social problems than on sociological problems. The consolidation of his work focused on topics such as "social stability, social groups and the psychic differentials corresponding to social status or class cleavages". To Mannheim the public was essential and fundamental to a democratic society. Therefore, assuring that not one ideology dictate all of the public is vital for the preservation of democracy.

=== British phase (1933–1947) ===
In his British phase Mannheim attempted a comprehensive analysis of the structure of modern society by way of democratic social planning and education. Mannheim's first major work published during this period was Man and Society in an Age of Reconstruction 1935, in which he argues for a shift from the liberal order of laissez-faire capitalism, "founded on the unregulated trade cycle, unextended democracy, free competition and ideas of competitive individualism" to planned democracy.

In Diagnosis of Our Time, Mannheim expands on this argument and expresses concern for the transition from liberal order to planned democracy, according to Longhurst, arguing "...the embryonic planned democratic society can develop along democratic or dictatorial routes...as expressed in the totalitarian societies of Nazi Germany and the Soviet Union". His work was admired more by educators, social workers, and religious thinkers than it was by the small community of British sociologists. His books on planning nevertheless played an important part in the political debates of the immediate post-war years, both in the United States and in several European countries.

== Legacy ==
Mannheim's sociological theorizing has been the subject of numerous book-length studies, evidence of an international interest in his principal themes. Mannheim was not the author of any work he himself considered a finished book, but rather of some fifty major essays and treatises, most later published in book form. In Spain his theories were followed by Artur Juncosa Carbonell.

== Selected works ==
- Mannheim, K. ([1922-24] 1980) Structures of Thinking. London: Routledge & Kegan Paul.
- Mannheim, K. ([1925] 1986) Conservatism. A Contribution to the Sociology of Knowledge. London: Routledge & Kegan Paul.
- Mannheim, K. (1929), Ideologie und Utopie
- Mannheim, K. ([1930] 2001) Sociology as Political Education. New Brunswick, NJ. Transaction.
- Mannheim, K. (1935 (English 1940)) Man and Society in an Age of Reconstruction: Studies in Modern Structure. Translated by Edward Shils. London: Routledge. 1940 – via Internet Archive.
- Mannheim, K. (1936) Ideology and Utopia. London: Routledge.
- Mannheim, K. (1950) Freedom, Power, and Democratic Planning. Oxford University Press
- Mannheim, K. ([1971] 1993) From Karl Mannheim. New Brunswick, NJ. Transaction.

== See also ==
- History and Class Consciousness
- Theory of generations
