= Mezőszilas =

- Coat of arms

- Location of Mezőszilas in Hungary
- Coordinates: 46.81771°N 18.47437°E
- Country: Hungary
- Region: Central Transdanubia
- County: Fejér
- Subregion: Sárbogárd
- Rank: Village

Area
  - Total: 65.1 km^{2} (25.1 sq mi)

Population (2009)
  - Total: 2,157
  - Density: 33.1/km^{2} (85.8/sq mi)
- Time zone: UTC+1 (CET)
  - Summer (DST): UTC+2 (CEST)
- Postal code: 7017
- Area code: +36 25
- KSH code: 29036
- Website: http://mezoszilas.hu/

Mezőszilas is a village in Fejér County, Hungary.
