= Andrew Jaszi =

Andrew Oscar Jászi (Hungarian: Jászi András Oszkár; March 1, 1917 – June 22, 1998) was a Hungarian-born philosopher and literary scholar. He taught as professor of German at the University of California, Berkeley, from 1948 to 1984.

== Biography ==
Jászi was born in Budapest into a distinguished family of assimilated Jews. His father, Oszkár Jászi, was a sociologist, historian, and politician who served as Minister of Nationalities in Mihály Károlyi's cabinet during the Hungarian Democratic Republic of 1918–19 before moving to the United States in 1925 to join the faculty of Oberlin College as Professor of Political Science. Andrew Jászi’s mother, Anna Lesznai, was a well-known artist and writer.

After his parents’ divorce in 1919, Jászi moved with his mother and brother George (1915–1992) to Vienna, where he received his primary school education. This was followed by a return to Budapest in 1931 and enrollment in the Deutsche Oberschule (“German High School”). As was typical of those of his background, he was raised bilingual in Hungarian and German, though German remained the primary language of his intellectual work throughout his life.

He finished high school in 1935, then came to the United States to join his father at Oberlin where he earned his B.A. in German in 1938. From there, he went to Harvard to begin his doctoral studies. Drafted into the U.S. army in 1942, he was dispatched to serve as an intelligence officer with the occupation forces in Germany.

Jászi completed his Ph.D. in German at Harvard in 1947. He was hired the following year by the University of California, Berkeley, where he taught classes in German literature until his retirement in 1984. He died at his home in Oakland, California, in 1998.

== Academic career ==
Jászi enjoyed a campus-wide reputation as an outstanding teacher. Recognized as “one of the most respected critics of German literature in the United States” as well as “one of the most beloved professors of the University,” he developed an original style of teaching that was rigorous yet also accessible to the non-specialist. Methodologically, he favored what has been termed “an ontological approach”; pedagogically, he incorporated Socratic dialogue and what, for lack of a better word, may be called “lecture.” In all this, he brought to his classes, and was capable of eliciting from his students, an exceptional degree of personal engagement.

Among his former students who have credited his influence are W. Michael Blumenthal, U.S. Secretary of Treasury under President Jimmy Carter (and later, Director of the Jewish Museum, Berlin); and philosopher and Jungian theorist Wolfgang Giegerich. Jaszi’s effectiveness in the classroom also drew plaudits from his colleagues. Heinz Politzer, the internationally renowned Kafka scholar at Berkeley with whom Jaszi occasionally co-taught advanced seminars, compared him to Wittgenstein and Buber.

Jászi was a well-known authority on Goethe. Other authors he specialized in were Kleist, ETA Hoffmann, Rilke, Hugo von Hofmannsthal, and Kafka. His scholarly research also extended more broadly, leading to courses on nineteenth- and twentieth-century poetry and drama, fairy tales, and psychological approaches to literature (especially Jung).

In addition to teaching at Berkeley, Jászi held positions as visiting professor at the University of Washington (1959–60), Harvard (1960), University of Colorado (1963) and University of Michigan (1965).

In recognition of his achievements, he was awarded the Berkeley Citation, one of the campus’s highest honors, in 1984.

== Philosophical work ==
Alongside his career as Professor of German Literature, Jászi spent much of his adult life working on a massive philosophical project dealing with fundamental questions of being and knowing, especially—but not only—in the area of aesthetics. These investigations, phenomenological in nature and method, treat such concepts as being, consciousness, time and space, change and motion, identity and difference, subject and object, part and whole.

Portions of these investigations were published in essay form throughout the 1950s and 60s, followed by a book-length monograph in 1974. Titled Erkenntnis und Wirklichkeit. Grundlagenkritische Voruntersuchungen (“Knowledge and Reality: Foundationally Critical Preliminary Investigations”), it is a radical condensation of the first half of a manuscript of almost ten-thousand pages, his magnum opus. Left unfinished and unpublished at his death, it is presently in private hands.

Jaszi’s philosophical investigations garnered high praise from some of the most prominent scholars of his era, a small but distinguished coterie who knew his work well. Emil Staiger, speaking of Jaszi’s book Erkenntnis und Wirklichkeit, called it “one of the most essential contributions to ontology in the entire realm of German research [...] possibly the most significant work in this area since Kant.” Other superlatives, equally impressive, came from the likes of Wilhelm Emrich, Richard Brinkmann, and Erich Heller.

== Publications by Andrew Jászi ==
=== Books ===
- Erkenntnis und Wirklichkeit. Grundlagenkritische Voruntersuchungen. Tübingen: Max Niemeyer Verlag, 1974.
- Entzweiung und Vereinigung. Goethes symbolische Weltanschauung (“unter Mitarbeit von Michael Mann”). Heidelberg: Lothar Stiehm, 1973.

=== Articles in English ===
- “The Inexhaustible Object: Trying to Understand Die Wahlverwandschaften.” In Goethe Proceedings: Essays Commemorating the Goethe Sesquicentennial at the University of California, Davis. Ed. C. Bernd, T. Lulofs, G. Nerjes, Fr. Sammern-Frankenegg, P. Schäffer. Columbia: Camden House, 1984, 67-76.
- “Reflections on Goethe’s Faust: In Honor of Stuart Atkins.” In Soundings, Collections of the University Library, XIII (University of California, Santa Barbara, 1982), pp. 24–37.
- “Symbolism and the Linguistic Paradox: Reflections on Goethe’s World View.” In Literary Symbolism: A Symposium. Ed. by Helmut Rehder. Austin: University of Texas Press, 1965, 65-82.
- “In the Realm of Beauty and Anguish: Some Remarks on the Poetry of Aestheticism.” Chicago Review 15, No. 2 (Autumn, 1961), 57-70.
- “The Word and the World: Some Remarks on the Difference between Poetry and Prose.” In Dichtung und Deutung. Gedächtnisschrift für Hans M. Wolff. Ed. by Karl Guthke. Bern: Francke, 1961.
- In The Poem Itself. Ed. Stanley Burnshaw. New York: Simon and Schuster, 1960. (Reprint 1981):
  - “Hofmannstahl’s ‘Die Beiden’”, 134-135.
  - “Hofmannstahl’s ‘Ballade des äusseren Lebens’“, 136-137.
  - “Hofmannsthal’s ‘Der Jüngling in der Landschaft’“, 138-139.

=== Articles in German ===
- “Einige Anmerkungen über die Zeit und Faust.” Deutsche Vierteljahrsschrift, Stuttgart (DVLG). 56:1 (Mar 1982), 92-100.
- "Über Vergegenwärtigung: Versuch einer Grundlegung.” Literaturwissenschaft und Geistesgeschichte. Festschrift für Richard Brinkmann. Ed. by Jürgen Brummack, et al. Tübingen: Max Niemeyer Verlag, 1981, 824-836.
- “’Märchen sagt: – es war einmal’.” Austriaca: Beiträge zur österreichischen Literatur. Festschrift für Heinz Politzer. Ed. by Winfried Kudszus and Hinrich Seeba. Tübingen: Niemeyer, 1975, 469-480.
- “Das Wort in der Zeit und das Ding in Zeit und Raum.” Deutsche Vierteljahrsschrift für Literaturwissenschaft und Geistesgeshichte 19:3 (1963), 169-196.
- “Ästhetische Form in Zeit und Raum: Ein Versuch.” Deutsche Vierteljahrsschrift für Literaturwissenschaft und Geistesgeshichte (1955), 365-389.
- “Rilkes Duineser Elegien und die Einsamkeit.” University of California Publications in Modern Philology. 36:7 (1952), 185-192.

== Awards ==
- Guggenheim Foundation Fellowship, 1965
- The Berkeley Citation, 1984
