= Arnold Hauser (art historian) =

Hungarian art historian

- Born: 8 May 1892 Temesvár, Austria-Hungary
- Died: 28 January 1978 (aged 85) Budapest, Hungary
- Occupation: Art historian, sociologist
- Citizenship: Hungarian and German

Arnold Hauser (8 May 1892 – 28 January 1978) was a Hungarian-German art historian and sociologist who was perhaps the leading Marxist in the field. He wrote on the influence of change in social structures on art.

== Life and main works ==
Hauser studied history of art and literature in Budapest, Vienna, Berlin and Paris. Among his teachers were Max Dvořák in Vienna, Georg Simmel in Berlin, Henri Bergson and Gustave Lanson in Paris. After World War I he spent two years in Italy, familiarizing himself with Italian art. In 1921, he moved to Berlin, and in 1924 to Vienna. By that time he had concluded, in his own words, that “the problem of art and literature, in the solution of which our time is most eagerly engaged, are fundamentally sociological problems.”

Another crucial influence on Hauser was Hungarian philosopher Bernhard Alexander, which transmitted to Hauser an interest for both William Shakespeare and Immanuel Kant. This led to Hauser's systematic study of theater and, later, cinema as parts of the larger world of art.

He embraced Marxism by first reading the writings of György Lukács, then meeting him and becoming part of his Sonntagskreis in Budapest. It was in Budapest that Hauser published his first writings, between 1911 and 1918, including his doctoral dissertation about the problem of creating a systematic aesthetics, which appeared in the journal Athenaeum in 1918. He published very little in the next 33 years, devoting himself to research and travel.

His life's work, the four volume Social History of Art (1951), argued that art—which, after a Paleolithic period of naturalism, began as "flat, symbolic, formalized, abstract and concerned with spiritual beings"—became more realistic and naturalistic as societies became less hierarchical and authoritarian, and more mercantile and bourgeois (Harrington).

== Criticism ==
Hauser's Marxist approach was criticized by Ernst Gombrich as “social determinism” going too far. Gombrich wrote in his review of The Social History of Art that Hauser's “theoretical prejudices may have thwarted his sympathies. For to some extent they deny the very existence of what we call the ’humanities’. If all human beings, including ourselves, are completely conditioned by the economic and social circumstances of their existence then we really cannot understand the past by ordinary sympathy.”

Some scholars have argued that Gombrich saw Hauser as a typical exponent of Marxism, without appreciating his nuances and subtle critique of the most rigid forms of social determinism.

== Writings ==
- 1951: Sozialgeschichte der Kunst und Literatur (The Social History of Art and Literature)
- 1958: Philosophie der Kunstgeschichte (The Philosophy of Art History)
- 1964: Der Manierismus. Die Krise der Renaissance und der Ursprung der modernen Kunst (Mannerism: The Crisis of the Renaissance and the Origin of Modern Art)
- 1974: Soziologie der Kunst (The Sociology of Art)
- 1978: Im Gespräch mit Georg Lukács kleiner Sammelband mit drei Interviews und dem Essay „Variationen über das tertium datur bei Georg Lukács“
