= Robert Wuthnow =

American sociologist (born 1946)

- Born: Robert John Wuthnow; 1946 (age 79–80); Kansas, US

Academic background
- Education: University of Kansas; University of California, Berkeley
- Thesis: Consciousness and the Transformation of Society (1975)
- Influences: Robert N. Bellah

Academic work
- Discipline: Sociology
- Sub-discipline: Cultural sociology; sociology of religion
- Institutions: Princeton University
- Doctoral students: W. Bradford Wilcox

Robert Wuthnow (born 1946) is an American sociologist who is widely known for his work in the sociology of culture and sociology of religion. He is the Gerhard R. Andlinger Professor of Sociology Emeritus at Princeton University, where he is also a former chair of the Department of Sociology and a founding director of the Princeton University Center for the Study of Religion.

== Life and career ==
Wuthnow was born in Kansas in 1946. His father was a farmer and his mother was a teacher. He earned his Bachelor of Arts degree at the University of Kansas in 1968 and his Doctor of Philosophy degree in sociology at the University of California at Berkeley in 1975. His dissertation was Consciousness and the Transformation of Society. While at Berkeley, Wuthnow worked closely with Charles Glock, Neil Smelser, Robert Bellah, Guy Swanson, and Gertrude Selznick. Wuthnow's first years at Berkeley were during the widespread protests on campus around the US, which ultimately inspired his dissertation. Glock and Bellah received a grant to study the symbolic—especially the religious—dimensions of the counter-culture movement from the Institute for Religion and Social Change. This four-year project resulted in the edited volume The New Religious Consciousness in 1976. Wuthnow realized that the counter-culture movements were just the most prominent evidence of deeper changes in American culture and used data from the project to argue this in his dissertation, eventually published as The Consciousness Reformation in 1976.

After teaching at the University of Arizona from 1974 to 1976, he took a position in sociology at Princeton University where he continued until his retirement in 2021.

Wuthnow has published widely in the sociology of religion, culture, and civil society. His research and teaching has included work in the areas of social change, the sociology of belonging, community, rural sociology, religion and politics, and sociological theory.

At Princeton, Wuthnow supervised numerous graduate students' dissertations, directed numerous foundation grants on various aspects of American religion and philanthropy, was the recipient of a Guggenheim fellowship for his research on religion and diversity, served as president of the Society for the Scientific Study of Religion and the Eastern Sociological Society, and was general editor of The Encyclopedia of Politics and Religion. He is the recipient of numerous awards for his research and publications, including the Distinguished Book Award for Communities of Discourse: Ideology and Social Structure in the Reformation, the Enlightenment, and European Socialism from the Society for the Scientific Study of Religion, the Tufts University Civic Engagement Prize, the Warren J. Mitofsky Award for Excellence in Public Opinion Research from the board of directors of the Roper Center for Public Opinion Research at Cornell University, the Martin E. Marty Award for Public Understanding of Religion from the American Academy of Religion, the Mirra Kamarosky Best Book Award for America and the Challenges of Religious Diversity from the Eastern Sociological Society, the Coral Horton Tullis Memorial Prize for Rough Country: How Texas Became America's Most Powerful Bible-Belt State from the Texas State Historical Association, and the Lifetime Achievement Award from the Association for the Sociology of Religion. He is an elected fellow of the American Academy of Arts and Sciences and the American Philosophical Society.

== Books ==
- Adolescent Prejudice (with others, 1975)
- The Consciousness Reformation (1976)
- Experimentation in American Religion: The New Mysticisms and their Implications for the Churches (1978)
- Cultural Analysis: The Work of Peter L. Berger, Mary Douglas, Michel Foucault, and Jürgen Habermas (with others, 1984) Spanish translation (1988) Chinese translation (1994)
- Meaning and Moral Order: Explorations in Cultural Analysis (1987)
- The Restructuring of American Religion: Society and Faith and Since World War II (1988)
- Communities of Discourse: Ideology and Social Structure in The Reformation, The Enlightenment and European Socialism (1989)
- The Struggle for America's Soul (1989)
- Acts of Compassion: Caring for Others and Helping Ourselves (1990)
- Christianity in the 21st Century: Reflections on the Challenges Ahead (1993)
- God and Mammon in America (1994)
- Producing the Sacred: An Essay on Public Religion (1994)
- Sharing the Journey: Support Groups and America's New Quest for Community (1994)
- Learning to Care: Elementary Kindness in an Age of Indifference (1995)
- Christianity and Civil Society: The Contemporary Debate (1996)
- Poor Richard's Principle: Recovering the American Dream through the Moral Dimension of Work, Business, and Money (1996)
- The Crisis in the Churches: Spiritual Malaise, Fiscal Woe (1997)
- After Heaven: Spirituality in America Since the 1950s (1998)
- Loose Connections: Joining Together in America's Fragmented Communities (1998)
- Growing Up Religious: Christians and Jews and Their Journeys of Faith (1999)
- Creative Spirituality: The Way of the Artist (2001)
- All in Sync: How Music and Art are Revitalizing American Religion (2003)
- Rediscovering the Sacred (1992)
- Saving America? Faith-Based Services and the Future of Civil Society (2004)
- America and the Challenges of Religious Diversity (2005)
- American Mythos: Why Our Best Efforts to Be a Better Nation Fall Short (2006)
- Boundless Faith: The Global Outreach of American Churches (2009)
- Be Very Afraid: The Cultural Response to Terror, Pandemics, Environmental Devastation Nuclear Annihilation, and Other Threats (2010)
- Remaking the Heartland: Middle America Since the 1950s (2011)
- The God Problem: Expressing Faith and Being Reasonable (2012)
- Red State Religion: Faith and Politics in America's Heartland (2012)
- Small-Town America: Finding Community, Shaping the Future (2013)
- Rough Country: How Texas Became America's Most Powerful Bible Belt State (2014)
- In the Blood: Understanding America's Farm Families (2015)
- Inventing American Religion: Polls, Surveys, and the Tenuous Quest for a Nation's Faith (2015)
- American Misfits and the Making of Middle Class Respectability (2017)
- The Left Behind: Decline and Rage in Small-Town America (2018)
- What Happens When We Practice Religion? Textures of Devotion in Everyday Life (2020)
- Why Religion Is Good for American Democracy (2021)
- Religion's Power: What Makes It Work (2023)
- Faith Communities and the Fight for Racial Justice: What Has Worked, What Hasn't, and Lessons We Can Learn (2023)
- Nurturing Happiness: How Religion Shapes Emotional Practice (2025)
- The Religious Left: What It Does and How It Can Do Better (2026)

== See also ==
- Charles Y. Glock
- Robert N. Bellah
