= Sheilaism =

Academic shorthand for an individualized, eclectic system of religious belief

Sheilaism is a shorthand term for an individual's system of religious belief which co-opts strands of multiple religions chosen by the individual usually without much theological consideration, a kind of religious or spiritual eclecticism. The term derives from a woman named Sheila Larson, who is quoted by Robert N. Bellah et al. in their book Habits of the Heart as following her own "little voice" in a faith she calls "Sheilaism".

== History ==
In chapter 9 of their 1985 book Habits of the Heart, Robert N. Bellah, Richard Madsen, William M. Sullivan, Ann Swidler, and Steven M. Tipton discuss how religion in America has moved from being highly public and unified, as it was in colonial New England, to extremely private and diverse. To demonstrate the shift, they quote a young nurse, to whom they gave the name Sheila Larson:

I believe in God. I'm not a religious fanatic. I can't remember the last time I went to church. My faith has carried me a long way. It's Sheilaism. Just my own little voice ... It's just try to love yourself and be gentle with yourself. You know, I guess, take care of each other. I think He would want us to take care of each other.

Bellah et al. suggest that Sheilaism creates the logical possibility "of over 220 million American religions, one for each of us," and they see Sheilaism as "a perfectly natural expression of current American religious life". Oddrun M. H. Bråten wrote:

Radically individualistic religion like "Sheilaism" may seem very different from, for example, fundamentalist religion, which is also characteristic of our time, but they both emphasise personal religious experience (spirituality). "Sheilaism" is rooted in an attempt to transform external authority to internal meaning. Some may prefer to choose a religion of external authority (Bellah 1985: 235) for this purpose. That religion in principle is a choice, is a result of the religious freedom gained in the western world through secularization: a central trait of western modernity (Taylor 2004: 185, Taylor 2007, see also chapter 2).

The coinage quickly became a touchstone for sociologists of religion who repeatedly reference it. One sociologist summed it up as "spiritual bricolage". Sheilaism even has worked its way into more mainstream culture.

The columnist Don Kahle concluded that Sheila "has a code of ethics, but it's no longer connected to a sacred text or an observing deity. It's personal – and unpublished. Sheila abides by Sheilaism. Sheilaism is good for Sheila, but it doesn't build community. Nobody but Sheila knows what are the codes of Sheilaism. Often Sheila doesn't know herself until something 'doesn't feel right'."

== Criticism ==
Bellah et al. saw Sheilaism as a form of self-absorption that caused a disaffiliation with communities. Their perspective was very much in line with the prevailing view of sociologists since the 1960s who saw such highly individualized religious experience as proof of a larger decline in the importance of religion in the United States as a whole. In later comments, Bellah summed up the problem with Sheilaism: "she has made the inner trip and hasn't come back out again, so to speak."

The cultural critic Hal Niedzviecki juxtaposes Sheilaism with Judyism, the joke religion created by comedian Judy Tenuta. Whereas Tenuta is poking fun at the idea of an individualist religion, even titling a book The Power of Judyism, Niedzviecki laments the fact that Sheilaists take the idea seriously. "Sheilaism permeates our individualistic conformity and continues to demand that our institutions dramatically change to accept us as we want to be."

Recent scholarship has re-evaluated Sheilaism, noting that even those who claim a particular organized denomination and regularly attend church often have highly individualized perceptions of their faith.

== See also ==
- Baháʼí Faith and the unity of religion
- Cafeteria Christianity
- Cultural Christian
- Cultural Hindu
- Cultural Jew
- Cultural Mormon
- Cultural Muslim
- Ethical monotheism
- Human Potential Movement
- Ietsism
- Lapsed Catholic
- Liberal Christianity
- Liberal Judaism
- Liberal and progressive movements within Islam
- Moralistic therapeutic deism
- Natural religion
- New Age
- Non-denominational
- Omnism
- Religious naturalism
- Religious syncretism
- Secular Buddhism
- Self religion
- Spiritual but not religious
