= A Rumor of Angels: Modern Society and the Rediscovery of the Supernatural =

Book by Peter L. Berger

- Cover of the first edition
- Author: Peter L. Berger
- Language: English
- Subject: Sociology
- Publisher: Doubleday
- Publication date: 1969
- Publication place: United States
- Media type: Print

A Rumor of Angels: Modern Society and the Rediscovery of the Supernatural is a 1969 book about sociology by the sociologist Peter L. Berger. The book is one of Berger's most important works on the topic of the sociology of religion. A Rumor of Angels had a profound influence within the American religious establishment as well; his work is frequently cited in church sources.

== Contents ==
=== Marginalization of religion ===
In Berger's studies, religion was found to be increasingly marginalized by the increased influence of the trend of secularization. Berger identified secularization as happening not so much to social institutions, such as churches, due to the increase of the separation of church and state, but applying to "processes inside the human mind" producing "a secularization of consciousness."

Theoretically, Berger questioned the then current secularization/modernization scheme, suggesting important modifications to the secularization theory and pointed to the exceptional status of Europe in this regard.

=== Inductive reasons for faith ===
Berger notes that, even given the hegemonic dominance of secularization, inductive human experience provides signs of a divine presence through signals of transcendence. Starting with man and his nature, he advances arguments from order, from play, from hope, from damnation, and from humor. These signs of transcendence connect man's aspirations and fears.
