= Enclave (disambiguation) =

An enclave is any portion of a state that is entirely surrounded by the territory of one other state.

Enclave may also refer to:

== Entertainment ==
- The Enclave, a 2002 film
- Enclave (comics), a group of villains in Marvel Comics
- Enclave (video game), a third-person 3D action game from Starbreeze Studios
- The Enclave, the remnants of the pre-war United States government in the Fallout video game series
- Enclave (film), a 2015 Serbian film

== Other uses ==
- Enclave, a private region of computer memory in Software Guard Extensions
- Buick Enclave, an automobile
- Enclave (geology), an aggregate of minerals or rock found inside another larger rock body

== See also ==
- Pirate enclave, a speculative view of early forms of autonomous proto-anarchist societies
- Ethnic enclave, a physical space with high ethnic concentration
- Language island, also called a language enclave or linguistic enclave, an area where one language is spoken and another is spoken around it
- Lifestyle enclave, a sociological term coined by Robert N. Bellah for people who share some feature of private life
- Military enclave, an area at a civil airport allotted to the armed forces
- Civil enclave, an area at a military air base allotted to civil operators
- Canton of Valréas, France, also known as the enclave des Papes
