= Invitation to Sociology =

1963 book by Peter L. Berger

Invitation to Sociology: A Humanistic Perspective
- Cover of the first edition
- Author: Peter L. Berger
- Language: English
- Subject: Sociology
- Publisher: Doubleday
- Publication date: 1963
- Publication place: United States
- Media type: Print (Hardcover and Paperback)
- Pages: 191
- ISBN: 9780385065290

Invitation to Sociology: A Humanistic Perspective is a 1963 book about sociology by the sociologist Peter L. Berger, in which the author sets out the intellectual parameters and calling of the discipline of sociology.

== Summary ==
The book sets out to introduce the field of sociology to interested parties, especially potential students, and to highlight key concepts and themes in sociology.

It clarifies both what sociology is, and also what sociology is not (for example - by clearing up confusion with related terms such as social work).

Philosophical and historical reflections recur throughout this short book. For example, Berger addresses the complementary approaches to the study of society developed by Max Weber and Émile Durkheim. Also, which types of questions sociologists may seek to answer (such as the social consequences of religious belief) and those which they cannot address through sociology proper (for example, philosophical questions on the existence of God).

Berger emphasizes that sociology is a broad academic discipline; it is both a body of knowledge and a way of viewing the world, rather than being merely a prescriptive methodology for achieving certain social goals.

As his central theme, Berger advocates that sociology should emphasize its humanistic aspects, rather than adopting the image of positivistic scientism favored by the natural sciences. For example, Berger espouses a focus on historical processes and on the role of persons, their biographies, their concrete social situations, and the moral exercise of their agency, instead of an overly narrow focus on statistical analysis of data in an impersonal fashion.

The content is wide-ranging and engaging for beginners; among other topics, Berger alludes to Machiavellianism, Marxism, psychoanalysis, existentialism, the caste system and race, and Black pride, stating of the latter in 1963, that it is "building up a counter-formation of a black racism that is but a shadow of its white prototype."

The author also ends the book with an appeal to sociologists and students to exercise their moral awareness and a sense of responsibility to use sociology to advance humane causes, human freedom and human dignity.
