= Listed buildings in Hunsingore =

Hunsingore is a civil parish in the county of North Yorkshire, England. It contains five listed buildings that are recorded in the National Heritage List for England. All the listed buildings are designated at Grade II, the lowest of the three grades, which is applied to "buildings of national importance and special interest". The parish contains the village of Hunsingore and the surrounding area. The listed buildings consist of a house, a dovecote, a watermill converted into a house, and a church and its lychgate.

== Buildings ==
Name and location	Photograph	Date	Notes
Rose Cottage; 53.97621°N 1.34720°W	—	1672	The house was extended in the mid 19th century, and has a T-shaped plan and a blue slate roof. The earlier range to the left is in limestone, and has one storey and an attic, and two bays, with the gable end facing the street. It contains horizontally-sliding sash windows, one with a dated and initialled lintel. The later part is in brown brick, with two storeys and two bays. It contains a doorway with a gabled hood and sash windows.
Pigeon House; 53.97387°N 1.34634°W		Late 18th century	The dovecote is in red brick on a stone foundation, with dentilled and corniced eaves, and a stone slate roof. There is a square plan, it contains a stable door, and in the gable is a small rectangular opening. On the roof is a small wooden louvre.
The Corn Mill; 53.97175°N 1.34845°W		1809	The water corn mill, later converted into a house, is in limestone and gritstone, and has a Westmorland slate roof with shaped kneelers and gable coping. There are two storeys and an attic, and fronts of three and four bays. The north front is gabled, and contains a doorway and square windows. In the gable is a circular window with a datestone above. At the rear is the entrance to the wheelhouse, and on the right return are external steps to a doorway.
St John's Church; 53.97652°N 1.34809°W		1867–68	The church, designed by Charles Kirk, is in pink sandstone with a Westmorland slate roof. It consists of a nave, north and south aisles, a south porch, a chancel with a polygonal apse, and a west steeple. The steeple has a three-stage tower and a broach spire with lucarnes.
Lychgate, St John's Church; 53.97606°N 1.34765°W		1867–68	The lychgate at the entrance to the churchyard is in pink sandstone with a slate roof. It has a square plan and consists of an open-sided double-chamfered pointed arch with diagonal buttresses, and on the sides are coped gables. Inside, on the north side, is a stone bench, and the gate is in wrought iron, about 1.2 metres (3 ft 11 in) high, with pointed bars, short dog-bars, and bands of scroll ornament.
