= Consequences of religiosity =

Sociologists of religion have stated that religious behaviour may have a concrete impact on a person's life. These consequences of religiosity are thought to include emotional and physical health, spiritual well-being, personal, marital, and family happiness. Although a simple correlation between religiosity and well-being is repeatedly reported in the research literature, recent multivariate research (which controls for other predictors of well-being) suggests religiosity's contribution to happiness is minuscule and sometimes negative.

== Glock's religiosity measure ==
This term consequences as the result of one's religiosity first appeared in Charles Y. Glock's five-dimensional religiosity measure. In the 1960s, Glock attempted to categorize the components of religiosity. In his five-dimensional scheme "consequences" are listed as the final dimension of religiosity. Glock theorized that certain consequences in a person's life can be attributed to religious living. Consequences of religiosity may include emotional and physical health, spiritual well-being, personal, marital, and family happiness. This, however, does not preclude the possibility of these factors working in the reverse as health, happiness and the like may interact with and have an influence on one's level of religiosity.

== Criticism of the term ==
Glock's consequential dimension of religiosity was criticized by some sociologists as they saw Glock's final dimension as consequence of religiosity and not a dimension of it.

== See also ==
- Anthropology of religion
- Religious capital
- Wealth and religion
