= Old Corn Mill, Hunsingore =

Mill building in Hunsingore, North Yorkshire, England

Coordinates: 53°58′18″N 1°20′54″W

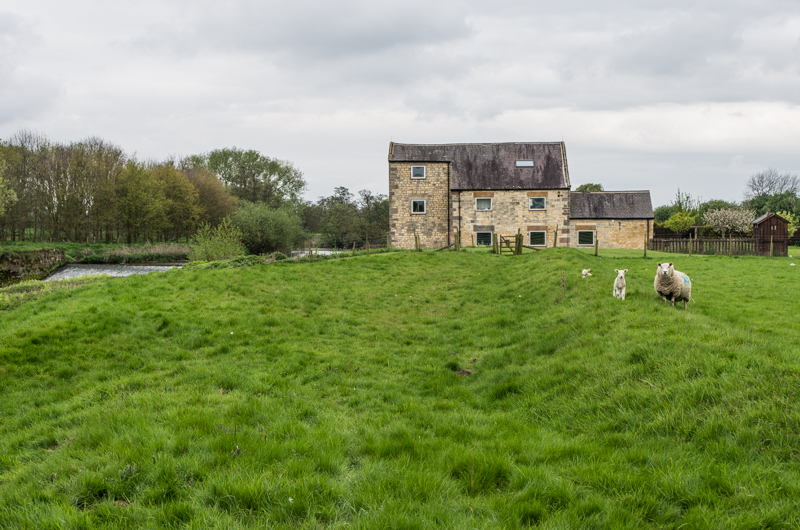
The building, in 2014

The Old Corn Mill is a historic building in Hunsingore, a village in North Yorkshire, in England.

The watermill lies on the north bank of the River Nidd and it was completed in 1809. It was used to grind corn, and had a breastshot water wheel. It was converted into a house in 1975, and the building was grade II listed in 1985.

The mill is built of limestone and gritstone, and has a Westmorland slate roof with shaped kneelers and gable coping. There are two storeys and an attic, and fronts of three and four bays. The north front is gabled, and contains a doorway and square windows. In the gable is a circular window with a datestone above. At the rear is the entrance to the wheelhouse, and on the right return are external steps to a doorway. Inside, the main roof timbers are visible, and the wheel shaft survives.

== See also ==
- Listed buildings in Hunsingore
