= Charles Y. Glock =

American sociologist (1919–2018)

- Born: October 17, 1919; The Bronx, New York, U.S.
- Died: October 19, 2018 (aged 99); Sandpoint, Idaho, U.S.
- Education: New York University; Boston University; Columbia University
- Scientific career
- Fields: Sociology, sociology of religion
- Workplaces: University of California
- Doctoral students: Earl Babbie; Armand Mauss; Rodney Stark; Robert Wuthnow

Charles Young Glock (October 17, 1919 – October 19, 2018) was an American sociologist whose work focuses on sociology of religion and survey research.

== Biography and academic background ==
Charles Glock was born in the Bronx, New York in 1919. He earned a B.S. degree in marketing at New York University in 1940 and a Master of Business Administration at Boston University in 1941. He served in the United States Army Air Forces from 1942 to 1946 where he became a major. After serving in the army, Glock earned a Ph.D. in sociology at Columbia University. Glock was professor of sociology at University of California, Berkeley, California. He was twice appointed chair of the department. Glock was a council member in the Religious Research Association in the early 1950s; president, American Association of Public Opinion Research, 1963–1964; one of the earliest members of the Society for the Scientific Study of Religion, and its president, 1967–1968; during 1978–1979, he served as vice-president of the American Sociological Association. Glock died on October 19, 2018, at the age of 99 in Sandpoint, Idaho.

== Measures of religiosity ==
Glock is probably best known for his five-dimensional scheme of the nature of religious commitment, which comprises belief, knowledge, experience, practice (sometimes subdivided into private and public ritual) and consequences. The first four dimensions have proved widely useful in research because generally, they are individually distinct and simple to measure; consequences, however, is a more complicated variable and difficult to isolate.

Glock's five-dimensional scheme inspired other sociologists to compose their own measures of religiosity. One of the more complex spin-offs was Mervin Verbit's twenty-four dimensional measure.

== Studies in prejudice and antisemitism ==
Aside from his accomplishments in sociology of religion, Glock's other important work concerns the sociological and cognitive sources of prejudice. His book "Christian Beliefs and Anti-Semitism" co-authored with Rodney Stark is based on surveys finding quantitative data in support of a theory tying Antisemitism to selective elements in Christian indoctrination.

== Books ==
- Glock, C. Y. (ed.) (1967). Survey research in the social sciences. New York: Russell Sage Foundation.
- Glock, C. Y. (ed.). (1973). Religion in Sociological Perspective. Belmont, CA: Wadsworth.
- Glock, C. Y., et al. (1975). Adolescent Prejudice. New York: Harper.
- Glock, C. Y. & Bellah, R. N. (1976). The new religious consciousness. Berkeley: University of California Press.
- Glock, C. Y. & Hammond, P.E. (1973). Beyond the classics? Essays in the scientific study of religion. Belmont CA: Wadsworth.
- Glock, C. Y. & Morris, G. (1981). A sociologist comments on getting, using, and making grants. Sanford NC: Microfilming Corporation of America.
- Glock, C. Y. & Quinley H. (1979). Anti-Semitism in America. New York: Free Press.
- Glock, C. Y. & Siegelman, E. (1969). Prejudice, U.S.A. New York: Praeger.
- Glock, C. Y. & Stark, R. (1965). Religion and Society in Tension. Chicago: Rand McNally.
- Glock, C. Y. & Stark, R. (1966). Christian beliefs and anti-Semitism. New York: Harper & Row.
- Glock, C. Y. & Stark, R. (1968). American Piety. Berkeley: University of California Press.
- Glock, C. Y. & Stark, R. (1971). Wayward Shepherds. New York: Harper.
- Glock, C. Y. & Stark, R. (1979). The northern California church member study. Ann Arbor: The Consortium.
- Glock, C. Y., Selznick, G. J. & J. L. Spaeth (1966). The apathetic majority: a study based on public responses to the Eichmann trial. New York: Harper & Row.
- Glock, C. Y., et al. (1967). To comfort and to challenge; a dilemma of the contemporary church. Berkeley: University of California Press.
- Stark, R. & Glock, C. Y. (1968). Patterns of religious commitment. Berkeley: University of California Press.
