= Robert N. Bellah =

American sociologist (1927–2013)

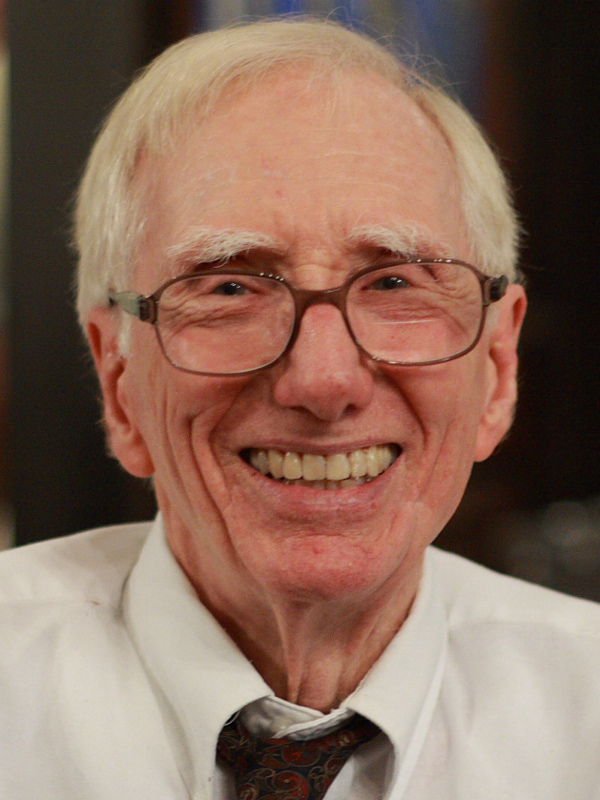
- Bellah in 2008
- Born: Robert Neelly Bellah; February 23, 1927; Altus, Oklahoma, U.S.
- Died: July 30, 2013 (aged 86); Oakland, California, U.S.
- Spouse: Melanie Hyman (m. 1948; died 2010)

Academic background
- Education: Harvard University (BA, PhD)
- Thesis: Religion and Society in Tokugawa Japan (1955)
- Doctoral advisor: Talcott Parsons; John Pelzel
- Other advisor: David Aberle
- Influences: Merlin Donald; Émile Durkheim; Karl Jaspers; Charles Taylor; Paul Tillich; Max Weber

Academic work
- Discipline: Sociology
- Sub-discipline: Sociology of religion
- School or tradition: Communitarianism
- Institutions: McGill University; University of California, Berkeley
- Doctoral students: Jeffrey C. Alexander
- Notable works: The Broken Covenant (1975); Habits of the Heart (1985); Religion in Human Evolution (2011)
- Notable ideas: American civil religion; lifestyle enclave; Sheilaism
- Influenced: Marc Andrus; Robert Wuthnow

Robert Neelly Bellah (February 23, 1927 – July 30, 2013) was an American sociologist and the Elliott Professor of Sociology at the University of California, Berkeley. He was internationally known for his work related to the sociology of religion.

== Education ==
Bellah graduated summa cum laude from Harvard College in 1950, receiving a Bachelor of Arts degree in social relations with a concentration in social anthropology. His undergraduate honors thesis won the Phi Beta Kappa Prize and was later published in 1952 with the title Apache Kinship Systems.

Bellah graduated from Harvard in a joint sociology and Far East languages program. Bellah first encountered the work of Talcott Parsons as an undergraduate when his senior honors thesis advisor was David Aberle, a former student of Parsons. Parsons was specially interested in Bellah's concept of religious evolution and the concept of "civil religion". He received his Doctor of Philosophy degree in 1955. His doctoral dissertation was titled Religion and Society in Tokugawa Japan and was an extension of Max Weber's Protestant ethic thesis to Japan. It was published as Tokugawa Religion in 1957.

While an undergraduate at Harvard, Bellah was a member of the Communist Party USA from 1947 to 1949 and a chairman of the John Reed Club, "a recognized student organization concerned with the study of Marxism". During the summer of 1954, Dean of the Faculty of Arts and Sciences at Harvard McGeorge Bundy, who later served as a national security adviser to John F. Kennedy and Lyndon B. Johnson, threatened to withdraw Bellah's graduate student fellowship if he did not provide the names of his former club associates. Bellah was also interrogated by the Boston office of the Federal Bureau of Investigation with the same purpose. As a result, Bellah and his family spent two years in Canada, where he was awarded a post-doctoral fellowship at the Islamic Institute in McGill University in Montreal. He returned to Harvard after McCarthyism declined due to the death of its main instigator senator Joseph McCarthy. Bellah afterwards wrote,

…I know from personal experience that Harvard did some terribly wrong things during the McCarthy period and that those things have never been publicly acknowledged. At its worst it came close to psychological terror against almost defenseless individuals. …The university and the secret police were in collusion to suppress political dissent and even to persecute dissenters who had changed their minds if they were not willing to become part of the persecution.

== Career ==
Bellah's magnum opus, Religion in Human Evolution (2011), traces the biological and cultural origins of religion and the interplay between the two. The sociologist and philosopher Jürgen Habermas wrote of the work: "This great book is the intellectual harvest of the rich academic life of a leading social theorist who has assimilated a vast range of biological, anthropological, and historical literature in the pursuit of a breathtaking project… In this field I do not know of an equally ambitious and comprehensive study." The book won the Distinguished Book Award of the American Sociological Association's Section on Sociology of Religion.

Bellah's most famous book, 'Habits of the Heart,' was published in 1985 and explored the role of religion in American society. He argued that Americans are torn between individualism and a desire for community, and that this tension is reflected in their religious beliefs.

Bellah is best known for his 1985 book Habits of the Heart, which discusses how religion contributes to and detracts from America's common good, and for his studies of religious and moral issues and their connection to society. Bellah was perhaps best known for his work related to American civil religion, a term which he coined in a 1967 article that has since gained widespread attention among scholars. Bellah argues that contemporary American religion is not limited to churches but also includes a trans-denominational civil religion. By analysing presidential speeches, he reveals the central role of references to God in public discourse. According to Bellah, although there is a formal separation between church and state, politics and social life are still shaped by religious forms and influences.

He served in various positions at Harvard from 1955 to 1967 when he took the position of Ford Professor of Sociology at the University of California at Berkeley. He spent the remainder of his career at Berkeley. His views are often classified as communitarian. A full biography of Robert Bellah, "the world's most widely read sociologist of religion", written by sociologist Matteo Bortolini, titled A Joyfully Serious Man. The Life of Robert Bellah, has been published by Princeton University Press in the fall of 2021.

== Nomination at Princeton ==
In 1972 Carl Kaysen and Clifford Geertz nominated Robert Bellah as a candidate for a permanent faculty position at the Institute for Advanced Study (IAS). (Bellah was at the IAS as a temporary member for the academic year 1972–1973.) On January 15, 1973, at an IAS faculty meeting, the IAS faculty voted against Bellah by thirteen to eight with three abstentions. All of the mathematicians and half of the historians voted against the nomination. All of the physicists voted in favor of the nomination. After the vote, Kaysen said that he intended to recommend Bellah's nomination to the IAS's trustees despite the vote. The faculty members who voted against Bellah were outraged. The dispute became extremely acrimonious, but in April 1973, Bellah's eldest daughter committed suicide and he, in grief, withdrew from consideration.

== Personal life ==
Bellah was born in Altus, Oklahoma, on February 23, 1927. His father was a newspaper editor and publisher who committed suicide when Bellah was three years old. His mother Lillian moved the family to Los Angeles, where she had relatives. Bellah grew up in Los Angeles and attended Los Angeles High School, where he and his future wife, Melanie Hyman, were editors of the student newspaper. They married in 1948 after she graduated from Stanford University, and he began studying at Harvard University after serving in the US Army. Bellah's wife died in 2010.

In 1977, Bellah conducted an affair with William M. Sullivan.

Bellah died July 30, 2013, at an Oakland, California, hospital from complications after heart surgery. He was 86 and was survived by his daughters Jennifer Bellah Maguire and Hally Bellah-Guther; a sister, Hallie Reynolds; and five grandchildren. Robert and Melanie Bellah's eldest daughter committed suicide in 1973. Their third daughter died at age 17 in 1976 in an automobile accident. Raised as a Presbyterian, he converted to Episcopalianism in the Anglo-Catholic tradition.

== Works ==
Robert Bellah is the author, editor, co-author, or co-editor of the following books:

- Tokugawa Religion: The Values of Pre-Industrial Japan (1957)
- Religion and Progress in Modern Asia (1965)
- Beyond Belief: Essays on Religion in a Post-Traditional World (1970)
- Emile Durkheim on Morality and Society (1973)
- The Broken Covenant: American Civil Religion in Time of Trial (1975)
- The New Religious Consciousness (1976)
- Varieties of Civil Religion (1980)
- Habits of the Heart: Individualism and Commitment in American Life (1985)
- Uncivil Religion: Interreligious Hostility in America (1987)
- The Good Society (1991)
- Imagining Japan: The Japanese Tradition and Its Modern Interpretation (2003)
- The Robert Bellah Reader (2006)
- Religion in Human Evolution: From the Paleolithic to the Axial Age (2011)
- The Axial Age and Its Consequences (2012)

== Awards and honors ==
Bellah was elected a Fellow of the American Academy of Arts and Sciences in 1967. In 1996, he was elected to the American Philosophical Society. He received the National Humanities Medal in 2000 from President Bill Clinton, in part for "his efforts to illuminate the importance of community in American society." In 2007, he received the American Academy of Religion Martin E. Marty Award for the Public Understanding of Religion. In 2008, he received the honorary doctorate of the Max Weber Centre of the University of Erfurt.

== See also ==
- American exceptionalism
- Lifestyle enclave
- Political religion
- Sheilaism
