= Michael Plekon =

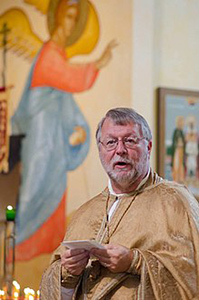
- Plekon preaching
- Born: April 3, 1948 (age 78); Yonkers, New York, U.S.
- Occupations: Professor; priest; sociologist; theologian
- Known for: Religious traditions, theology, sociology, anthropology, philosophy

Academic background
- Education: Rutgers University; Catholic University of America

Michael Plekon (born April 3, 1948) is an American priest, professor, author, sociologist and theologian. He has published more than a dozen books, as well as hundreds of journal papers, book chapters and reviews on faith and holiness. His works include religious social history, social theory and its connections with theology, the works of Søren Kierkegaard, contemporary Eastern Orthodox theology and theologians of the Russian emigration and saints. Living Icons, (UNDP, 2002) was one look at persons of faith in the Eastern Church. His research and publications have continued to explore persons of faith, seeking identity and God in their spiritual journeys. These volumes include Hidden Holiness (UNDP, 2009), Saints as They Really Are (UNDP, 2012), and The World as Sacrament (Liturgical Press, 2017) These studies examine persons of faith struggling for social justice and for ways of rediscovering holiness in ordinary life. He is especially interested in the encounter with God in the everyday.

Plekon's efforts to describe what holiness looks like in our time, the distinctive characteristics of women and men of faith, have been praised by colleagues. They see this work as an important "new hagiography" or writing about saints who are our contemporaries, like Dorothy Day, Mother Teresa, Thomas Merton or Daniel Berrigan.

Plekon has had a long career as an academic, theologian and clergy member. Since 1977, Plekon taught at Baruch College, first as an assistant professor, and eventually as a professor within the Weissman School of Arts and Sciences since 1998. He retired in 2017 and is an emeritus professor. In addition to his academic work, he has served as an associate priest at several parishes since being ordained in 1983. He has been a priest in both the Western and Eastern Churches, currently in The Episcopal Church. He has served parishes alongside teaching, research and writing. He continues writing about his pastoral experiences and is examining the importance of community, not only for church but for meaning in one's life in The Church Has Left the Building (Cascade, 2017) and Community as Church, Church as Community (Cascade, 2021). This work also deals with our need, in a diverse and conflicted America, to encounter other cultures and religious traditions with respect, learning from them and becoming deeper persons of faith from such experiences. This was something he experienced in his own family's ecumenical sensitivity.

Plekon's book, Uncommon Prayer: Prayer in Everyday Experience, was named by Spirituality and Practice as one of the best spiritual books of 2016 and was the Gold Winner of the 2016 Foreword INDIES book of the Year Award in the Adult Nonfiction, Religion category. He published Ministry Matters: Pastors, Their Life and Work Today (Cascade) in 2024, and his latest book, Communion and Community (Cascade) appears in 2026.

== Biography ==
Plekon's interest in studying religion began early on when he chose to pursue a bachelor's degree in Sociology and Philosophy from the Catholic University of America in Washington, D.C., in 1970. He later obtained a master's degree and a doctorate in Sociology and Religion from Rutgers University in New Jersey. Plekon's doctoral advisor was the late renowned sociologist of religion and theologian Peter L. Berger, who mentions Plekon in his memoir among his students of interest as an "expert in the Orthodox (Christian) diaspora in the West.". Under several fellowships, including from the NEH, Lutheran World Federation, Fulbright and ACLS, he did advanced research in the Theology Faculty of the University of Copenhagen, focusing on Kierkegaard's social criticism and theology.

Plekon met his wife Jeanne through a long-time friend while she was pursuing a master's in art history and museum studies at The Clark Institute, Williams College. They have been married since 1976 and have two children, Paul and Hannah, and several grandchildren.

== Awards and honors ==
Plekon has received more than twenty research awards in his years at Baruch College of the city University of New York, including annual PSC-CUNY Faculty Research Awards, several Baruch Faculty Fellowships for a year of study and other research grants.

- Ecumenical advisor, Lutheran Forum, 1996–2007
- Nominee, Excellence in Teaching Award, Baruch College, 1981, 1983, 1985, 1987, 1998
- Election as President of the Board of Lutheran Ministries in Higher Education, 1982–87
- Associate member, Columbia University Seminar in Religious Studies, 1982–87
- Honoree, City University of New York Salute to Scholars, 1981
- National Endowment for the Humanities Fellow, honorary Fulbright, American Scandinavian Institute and Lutheran World Federation Fellow at the University of Copenhagen's Institute for Systematic Theology

== Sources ==
- Academia.edu page with CV and texts of more than 60 articles
- Faculty Page at Baruch College
- Author interviews at Eastern Christian Books website
- College Talk with Weissman School of Arts and Sciences Dean Aldemaro Romero Jr. Romero video
- College talk with Dean Romero article
- Online interview at AFR
- The Liturgy of Life: Alexander Schmemann by Michael Plekon
- Adventures of an Accidental Sociologist: How to Explain the World Without Becoming a Bore
