= Kathleen Gough =

British anthropologist

- Born: 16 August 1925
- Died: 8 September 1990 (aged 65)

Academic background
- Education: Cambridge University

Academic work
- Discipline: Anthropologist

Eleanor Kathleen Gough Aberle (16 August 1925 – 8 September 1990) was a British anthropologist and feminist who was known for her work in South Asia and South-East Asia. As a part of her doctorate work, she did field research in Malabar district from 1947 to 1949. She did further research in Tanjore district from 1950 to 1953 and again in 1976, and in Vietnam in 1976 and 1982. In addition, some of her work included campaign for nuclear disarmament, the civil rights movement, women's rights, the third world and the end of the Vietnam War. She was known for her Marxist leanings and was on an FBI watchlist.

== Early life and education ==
Kathleen Gough was born on 16 August 1925 in Hunsingore, a village near Wetherby in Yorkshire, England, that then had a population of 100, no electricity and no piped water. She had a brother and a half-sister. Her father, Albert, was a blacksmith who became involved in the introduction of agricultural machinery to the area and has been described by David Price as being a "working-class radical".

She was educated at the church school in Hunsingore, from where she obtained a scholarship to King James's Grammar School, Knaresborough and then, in 1943, to Girton College, Cambridge. She excelled in anthropology at Girton and pursued postgraduate research there, receiving her degree in 1950. In July 1947, while undertaking that research, she married Eric John Miller, who was also a student. The couple undertook anthropological fieldwork in Kerala. Gough initially was supervised by J. H. Hutton, whose work on caste in India was informed by early twentieth-century anthropological concerns about the origins of social institutions. After Hutton's retirement, British social anthropologist, Meyer Fortes, whose theoretical interests emphasised social structure, oversaw her work. Gough and Miller found the strain of fieldwork impacted on their marriage and they divorced amicably in 1950. She completed her doctorate in anthropology from Cambridge University in the same year and returned to India alone to pursue further fieldwork. She later, married fellow anthropologist David Aberle in 1955.

== Career ==
Gough's research in India were primarily in the Malabar district from 1947 to 1949 and in the Tanjore district from 1950 to 1953. Her efforts were groundbreaking and she published five papers in the 1950s. She contributed over half of the content published as Matrilineal Kinship in 1961, of which Heike Moser and Paul Younger say that "Her analysis is a brilliant example of the structural-functionalist anthropology associated with Britain in her day, and everyone since has begun from her explanations or matriliny of marumukatayam as descent through the female line.... The debates that raged about matriliny, marriage ceremonies, hypergamy, and polyandry after these definitive studies were complex."

She returned to India in 1976 and it was after this visit that most of her research work on India was published. She visited Vietnam in the same year and again in 1982.

Gough was employed in teaching positions at Brandeis University from 1961 to 1963, the University of Oregon from 1963 to 1967 and Simon Fraser University from 1967 to 1970. She was an Honorary Research Associate at the University of British Columbia from 1974 until her death. Gough also taught and conducted research at Harvard, Manchester, Berkeley, University of Michigan, Wayne State, Toronto, and British Columbia.

== Politics ==
Gough was a Marxist and the responses of some university administrations to her leftist leanings sometimes landed her in trouble. She supported Cuba during the Cuban Missile Crisis and was outspoken in her condemnation of police brutalities. As a result, most of the stipulated pay hikes during her teaching career were cancelled. Moreover, Gough's membership in the Johnson-Forest Tendency and her work for civil rights and against the war in Vietnam triggered the interest of the FBI, who placed her and her husband on their watchlist. In addition, Gough was active in peace movements within Brandeis campus, specifically from 1961 to 1963. Gough and her husband left the United States in 1967 to work in Canada. She explained the decision in the April 1968 Monthly Review article "Anthropology and Imperialism.", writing "...we were unwilling to allow the academic grades that we gave our male students in their university classes to be used by draft bodies, under the Selective Service system, as a criterion of whether or they should be conscripted for military service in Vietnam."

Gough promoted the welfare of lower castes in India, hoping to bring them closer to the principles of Communism. Gough also strongly opposed upper castes who generally supported right-wing politics and anti-Marxism.

== Works ==
Some of Gough's more important works include Ten More Beautiful: The Rebuilding of Vietnam (1978), Rural Society in Southeast India (1981), Rural Change in Southeast India, 1950s–1980s (1989) and Political Economy in Vietnam (1990).

- The Traditional Kinship System of the Nayars of Malabar. Harvard University. 1954.
- "The Social Structure of a Tanjore Village," In Village India: Studies in the Little Community, ed. by McKim Marriott. American Anthropological Association Memoir No. 843, pp. 36–52.
- "Brahman Kinship in a Tamil Village," American Anthropologist vol. 58: 826-53.
- Cult of the dead among the Nayars. 1958.
- Anthropology and Imperialism. Radical Education Project. 1960.
- Nayar: Central Kerala. University of California Press. 1961.
- David Murray Schneider; Kathleen Gough (1961). Matrilineal Kinship. University of California.
- The Decline of the State and the Coming of World Society: An Optimist's View of the Future. Correspondence Publishing Company. 1962.
- "Caste in a Tanjore Village." In Aspects of Caste in South India, Ceylon and North-West Pakistan. ed. by E. R. Leach. Cambridge: Cambridge University Press, pp. 11–60.
- Female Initiation Rites on the Malabar Coast. 1965.
- John Rankin Goody, ed. (1968). Literacy in Traditional Societies. University Press.
- "Anthropology and Imperialism." Monthly Review 12:12-27.
- Caste in a Tanjore Village. Department of Archaeology and Anthropology at the University Press. 1969.
- The Struggle at Simon Fraser University. Thurston Taylor. 1970.
- Kathleen Gough; Hari P. Sharma, eds. (1973). Imperialism and Revolution in South Asia. Monthly Review Press. ISBN 978-0-85345-273-7.
- The Origin of the Family. New Hogtown Press. 1973.
- Class developments in South India. Centre for Developing-Area Studies, McGill University. 1975.
- Ten times more beautiful:The Rebuilding of Vietnam. Monthly Review Press. 1978. ISBN 978-0-85345-464-9.
- Dravidian Kinship and Modes of Production. Indian Council of Social Science Research. 1978.
- Rural Society in Southeast India. Cambridge University Press. 1981. ISBN 978-0-521-04019-8.
- Southeast Asia: Facing the Challenge of Socialist Construction. Synthesis Publications. 1986.
- Rural Change in Southeast India: 1950s to 1980s. Oxford University Press. 1989. ISBN 978-0-19-562276-8.
- Political Economy in Vietnam. Folklore Institute. 1990.
- Saghir Ahmed (1977). Class and Power in a Punjabi Village (Introduction). Monthly Review Press. ISBN 978-0-85345-385-7.

== Death ==
She died from cancer in Vancouver on 8 September 1990 after a four-month illness. She was buried on 13 September 1990 at Capilano View cemetery.
