= David Aberle =

American anthropologist (1918–2004)

- David Aberle
- Born: David Friend Aberle; November 23, 1918; Saint Paul, Minnesota, US
- Died: September 23, 2004 (aged 85); Vancouver, British Columbia, Canada
- Spouse: Kathleen Gough (m. 1955)

Academic background
- Education: Harvard University; Columbia University
- Thesis: The Reconciliation of Divergent Views of Hopi Culture Through the Analysis of Life-History Material (1950)
- Doctoral advisor: Ruth Benedict

Academic work
- Discipline: Anthropology
- Sub-discipline: Cultural anthropology
- Institutions: University of Michigan; Brandeis University; University of Oregon; University of British Columbia
- Notable students: Robert N. Bellah

David Friend Aberle (1918–2004) was an American anthropologist. He was well renowned for his work with the American Southwestern culture of the Navaho.

== Early life and education ==
Aberle was born on November 23, 1918, in Saint Paul, Minnesota. He received his undergraduate degree from Harvard University, graduating summa cum laude and had attended three field schools in the summer at the University of New Mexico. These field schools consisted of two archaeological expeditions, and one ethnographic expedition. In the fall of 1940, Aberle began graduate work in anthropology at Columbia University. Like many others, Aberle's graduate work was interrupted by the Second World War. Aberle spent three and a half years in the United States Army; most of his time was as a chief clerk in the outpatient psychiatric service performing psychological interviewing and testing for patients in his clinic. Once Aberle finished his stint in the army, he resumed his studies. Aberle finished his dissertation at Columbia in 1947 titled The Reconciliation of Divergent Views of Hopi Culture Through the Analysis of Life-History Material with Ruth Benedict as chair of his dissertation committee. Aberle received his PhD in 1950.

== Marriage and career ==
After Aberle completed both his undergraduate and graduate work at Harvard and Columbia University, he began to study in more detail the culture of the Navaho, which he had been deeply interested in since his fieldwork with the University of New Mexico. Aberle also took on several teaching positions at universities, including Harvard, Johns Hopkins, Michigan, Brandeis, Oregon, and beginning in 1967 until his retirement in 1983, the University of British Columbia. In the year 1954, Aberle met fellow anthropologist Kathleen Gough; they married in 1955, and had a son, Stephen Aberle, in 1956. Aberle and Gough both held interests in kinship, social Movements, and social justice. One interest that they did not share was the area which they would conduct their research. While Aberle was interested in the American Southwest, Gough was interested in South Asia. Both Gough and Aberle sought to resolve conflict, and promote social justice and tolerance in various areas of the world. In the 1950s and 1960s they were active in the movements for civil rights and against the Cold War and the war in Vietnam in the United States; they continued their work after moving to Canada in 1967. Aberle wrote and published his work concerning Navaho religion, cultural practices, and kinship, titled The Peyote Religion Among the Navaho in 1967 and his second publication regarding the kinship system of the Athapaskan-speaking communities, Lexical Reconstruction: The Case of the Proto-Athapaskan Kinship System in 1974. In the late 1960s to the early 1980s, Aberle supervised many students who completed dissertations and theses that had topics related to Athapaskan speakers. Aberle had also taken part in several research projects that held relevance to the kinship practices of Proto-Athapaskan speech communities.

== Thought ==
Aberle was commonly looked upon as an experienced cultural anthropologist who studied the American Southwest, which is represented by his work The Peyote Religion Among the Navaho. Aberle examined kinship and religious practices among the Navaho and Proto-Athapaskan speaking communities of Alaska. Aberle's work The Peyote Religion Among the Navaho shows how the economic and political forces at play in the Navaho culture reflects the everyday operation of cultural practices, religion, and ways in each Navaho community. These factors represent the different religious movements at play during his research time within this cultural community. This book also helped outline his subject community's cultural beliefs and practices in more detail than previously available. In Lexical Reconstruction: The Case of the Proto-Athapaskan Kinship System Aberle defines the focus of his study on kinship systems in relation to proto-language which could have existed as far back as 1500 years in Western Canada, Alaska, Southwestern United States, and within Oklahoma:

Anthropologists are interested in reconstructing the kinship system as it might have existed at the time of a proto-language. A kinship system can be regarded as composed of two correlated systems: a system of kinship terminology and a set of behaviors that are patterned in relation to the terminological system. We know of no way in which we can rigorously infer the kinds of behavior directly, but it is generally regarded as possible to reconstruct the terminology at least in part. If rigor can be introduced in the procedure of reconstructing kinship terminology, then a generalization of that rigorous procedure is lexical reconstruction.

Lexical Reconstruction consisted of over twenty years of collaboration with linguist Isidore Dyen. During this study, Aberle contributed his cultural knowledge of Athapaskan communities and linguist Dyen contributed his linguistic skills to reconstruct historical kinship patterns of these communities. They also looked at the origins of matriliny in these cultures. This book was best known for information on matriliny and for its wealth of information regarding Athapaskan speaking communities.

== Works ==
- Aberle, David (1951). The Psychosocial Analysis of a Hopi Life-History. University of California Press.
- Aberle, David (1953). The Kinship System of the Kalmuk Mongols. University of New Mexico Press.
- Aberle, David (1957). Navaho and Ute Peyotism: A Chronological and Distributional Study. University of Colorado Press.
- Aberle, David (1962). Chahar and Dagor Mongol Bureaucratic Administration: 1912-1945. HRAF Press.
- Aberle, David (1967). The Peyote Religion Among the Navaho. Aldine Publishing Co.
- Aberle, David (1969). A Plan for Navajo Economic Development. US GPO.
- Aberle, David (1974). Lexical Reconstruction: The Case of the Proto-Athapaskan Kinship System. Cambridge University Press.
