= St John the Baptist's Church, Hunsingore =

Church in Hunsingore, North Yorkshire, England

Coordinates: 53°58′35″N 1°20′53″W

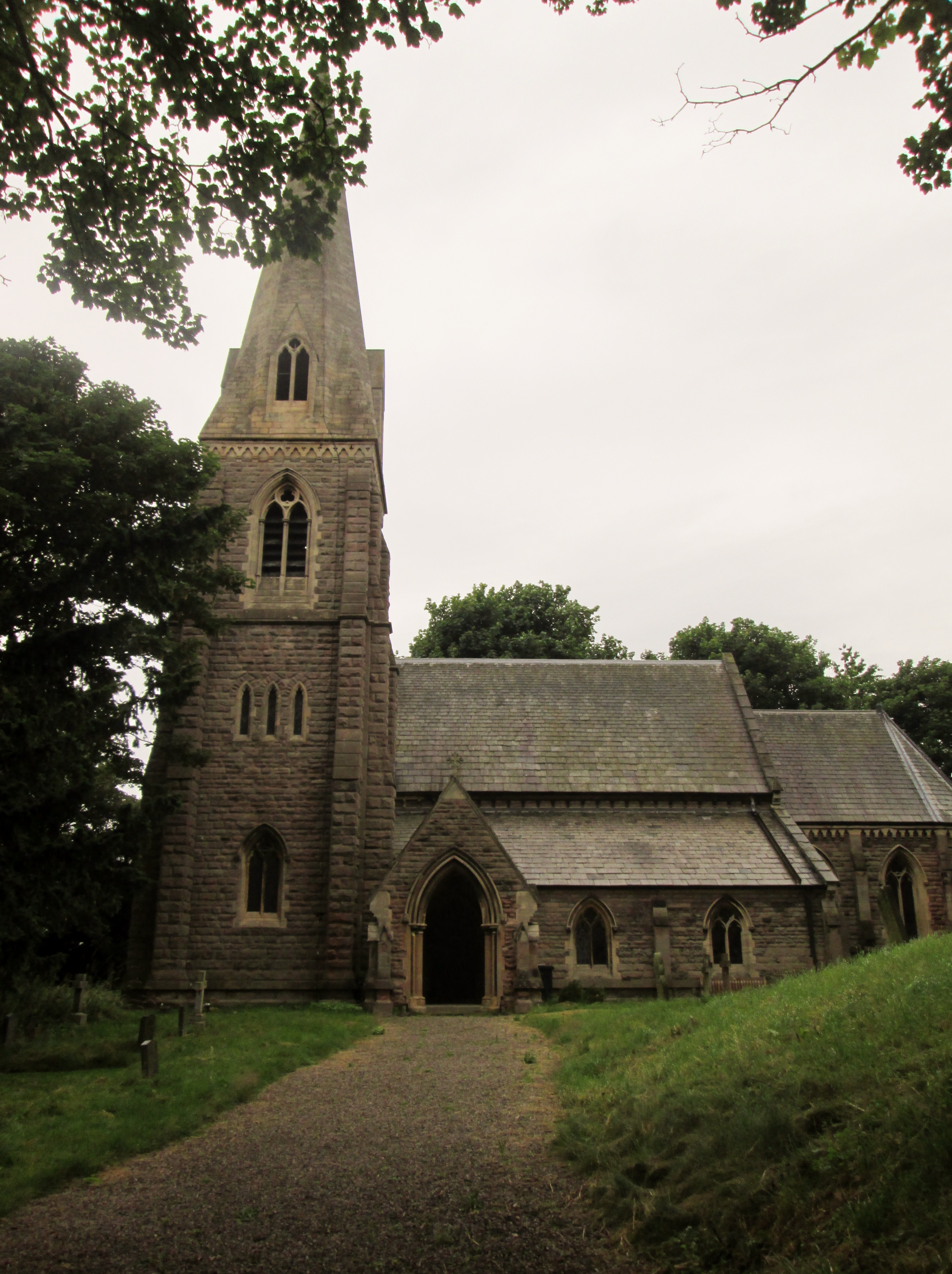
The church, in 2016

St John the Baptist's Church is the parish church of Hunsingore, a village in North Yorkshire, in England.

There was a church in Hunsingore from the mediaeval period, which in 1848 was described as "an ancient structure, with a tower". By 1867, it was in poor condition, so it was demolished, and a new church constructed on the same site. It was commissioned by John Dent, and designed by Charles Kirk. It is in the Geometric Gothic style, and was completed in 1868. The building was grade II listed in 1985.

The church is built of pink sandstone with a Westmorland slate roof. It consists of a nave, north and south aisles, a south porch, a chancel with a polygonal apse, and a west steeple. The steeple has a three-stage tower and a broach spire with lucarnes. The porch has two carved faces at the ends of its hood mould, which may represent Queen Victoria and John Dent. The door has decorative wrought iron hinges. Inside, original fittings include the font, pulpit, organ, reredos and lighting. The windows are of two or three lights and have tracery, the west end having stained glass by Franz Mayer of Munich, while the east end has glass by Ward and Hughes.

== See also ==
- Listed buildings in Hunsingore
