= Hunsingore =

Village and civil parish in North Yorkshire, England

Coordinates: 53°58′32″N 1°20′51″W

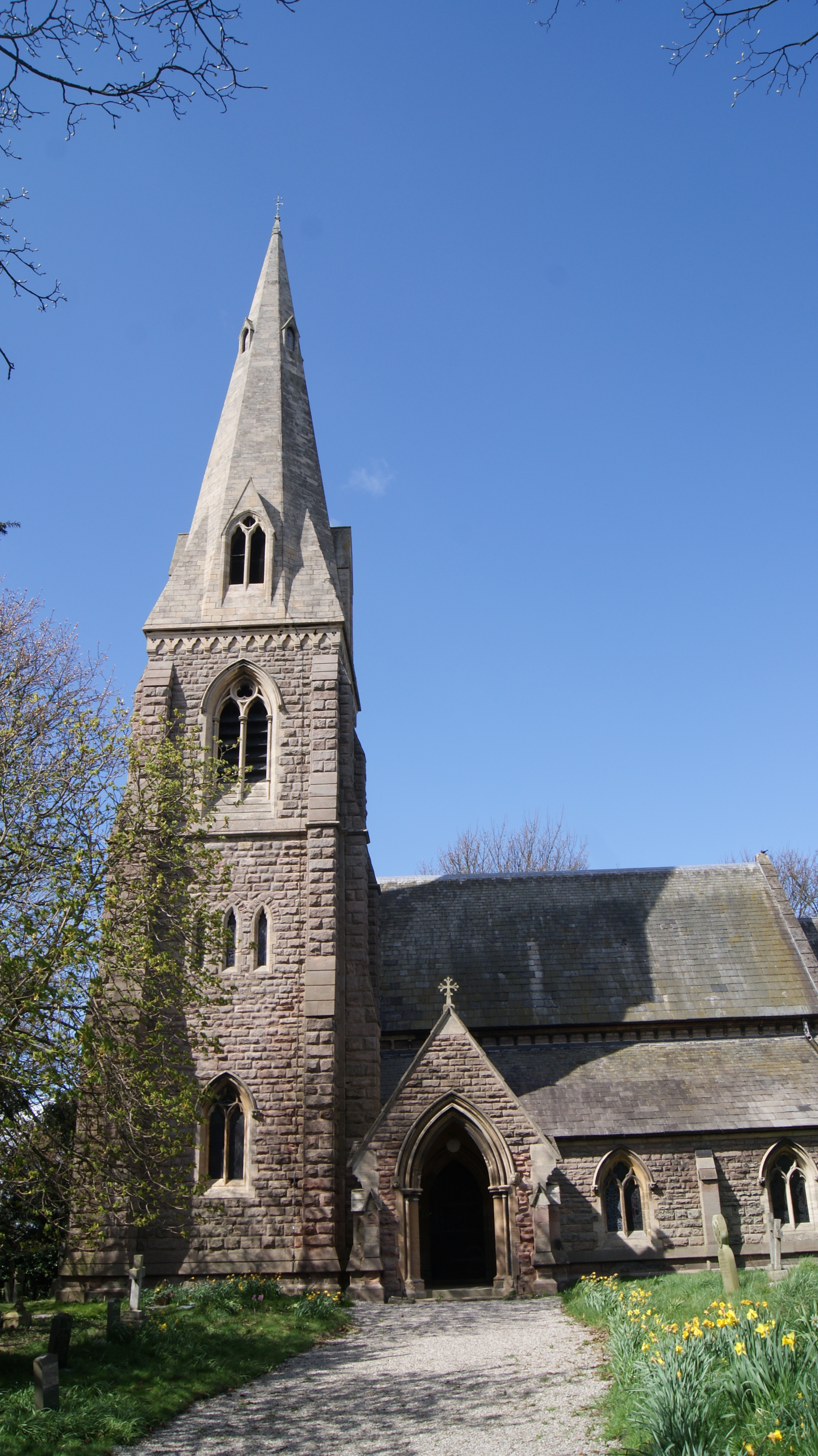
- St John the Baptist Church

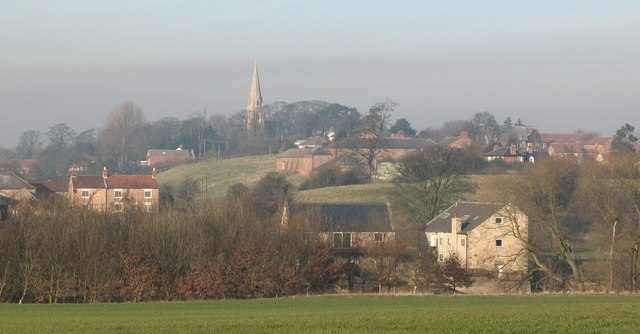
- Looking across the fields to Hunsingore

- Location within North Yorkshire
- Population: 129 (2011 census)
- OS grid reference: SE429534
- Civil parish: Hunsingore
- Unitary authority: North Yorkshire
- Ceremonial county: North Yorkshire
- Region: Yorkshire and the Humber
- Country: England
- Sovereign state: United Kingdom
- Post town: WETHERBY
- Postcode district: LS22
- Police: North Yorkshire
- Fire: North Yorkshire
- Ambulance: Yorkshire

Hunsingore is a village and civil parish in the county of North Yorkshire, England. It is situated near the River Nidd and the A1(M) motorway, about 14 miles (23 km) west of York, and 4 miles (6.4 km) north east of Wetherby.

== History ==
Hunsingore translates as "ofer or ridge of Hunsinge’s people". In the Domesday Book of 1086, the village is listed as Hulsingovre. The Goodricke family owned lots of land in the area and they lived in New House in Hunsingore rather than Ribston Hall. New House was believed to have been destroyed by Cromwell after the Battle of Marston Moor in 1644.

Originally Hunsingore was in the Claro Wapentake of the West Riding of Yorkshire. Since the county boundary shake up of 1974, it has been in North Yorkshire. From 1974 to 2023 it was part of the Borough of Harrogate, it is now administered by the unitary North Yorkshire Council.

The Old Corn Mill, a former water-powered corn mill, is on the River Nidd by the weir. The weir is still on the river, but the mill has been converted into housing.

There used to be a primary school in the village, but it was closed down due to low numbers. Children from Cowthorpe used to come across from the south bank of the Nidd via a footbridge to attend school here.

St John the Baptist's Church, Hunsingore, was designed in 1868 in a High Victorian Gothic style, including an unusual and fanciful covered entrance to the churchyard. The architect was Charles Kirk of Sleaford. The church is now in the Lower Nidderdale Parish.

== Transport ==
The nearest railway station is Cattal which is 2.5 mi (4 km) by road. The bus service through the village runs twice daily and is a Demand Responsive Service (IE must be booked in advance) to Wetherby.

The village is bounded to the west by the A1(M), but access must be gained by going on the A168 to the next junction in either direction. The A59 passes just north of Cattal and gives access to York and Harrogate.

== People associated with Hunsingore ==
- John Goodricke (astronomer) – buried here
- Kathleen Gough (anthropologist) – born here

== See also ==
- Listed buildings in Hunsingore
