= Religious capital =

Concept in sociology of religion

In sociology of religion, religious capital is the investment an individual makes into their religious faith. The investment is the time and physical work involved with the religious faith, as well as the personal investment in ideology, doctrine, and practice.

Rodney Stark has defined it as "(the) degree of mastery of and attachment to a particular religious culture", and has used this theory to explain conversion experiences in a number of his books, notably The Victory of Reason: How Christianity Led to Freedom, Capitalism, and Western Success and The Rise of Christianity: How the Obscure, Marginal Jesus Movement Became the Dominant Religious Force.

Within the realm of conversion, religious capital theory predicts that individuals will attempt to conserve their religious capital. "Although the concepts of social, cultural, and religious capital are widely used in the social sciences, they have rarely been applied to the specific phenomenon of religious conversion." Large doctrinal or behavioral changes lose more religious capital than small ones, thus an Episcopalian is more likely to become Catholic than Seventh-day Adventist or Lutheran, or Moslem to Christian. More recent work is inclined to define the concept in terms of Bourdieu's conception of 'capital' in relation to a particular (religious) field.
