= Lifestyle enclave =

Sociology term for people who share a feature of private life

Lifestyle enclave is a sociological term first used by Robert N. Bellah et al. in their 1985 book, Habits of the Heart: Individualism and Commitment in American Life. In the glossary of the book, they provide the following definition: "A lifestyle enclave is formed by people who share some feature of private life. Members of a lifestyle enclave express their identity through shared patterns of appearance, consumption, and leisure activities, which often serve to differentiate them sharply from those with other lifestyles." This term is contrasted with community, which Bellah et al. claim is characterized by social interdependence, shared history, and shared participation in politics.

The concept of lifestyle enclave has been used to analyse, for example, youth subcultures and the relationship between leisure and democracy.
