= Peter L. Berger =

American sociologist (1929–2017)

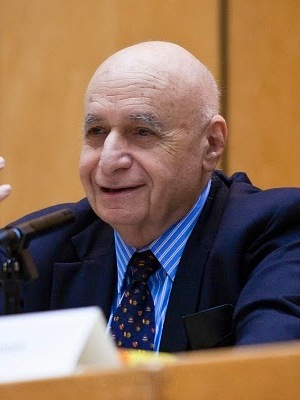
- Berger in 2010
- Born: Peter Ludwig Berger; March 17, 1929; Vienna, Austria
- Died: June 27, 2017 (aged 88); Brookline, Massachusetts, U.S.
- Spouse: Brigitte Kellner (m. 1959; died 2015)

Academic background
- Education: Wagner College (BA); The New School (MA, PhD)
- Influences: Alfred Schütz; Max Weber

Academic work
- Discipline: Sociology; theology
- Sub-discipline: Sociology of knowledge; sociology of religion
- Institutions: The New School for Social Research; Rutgers University; Boston College; Boston University
- Doctoral students: Os Guinness; James Davison Hunter; Michael Plekon; Uwe Siemon-Netto
- Notable students: Chaim I. Waxman
- Notable works: The Social Construction of Reality (1966); Invitation to Sociology: A Humanistic Perspective (1963); A Rumor of Angels: Modern Society and the Rediscovery of the Supernatural (1969)

Peter Ludwig Berger (Note: Pronounced /ˈbɜːrɡər/.) (17 March 1929 – 27 June 2017) was an Austrian-born American sociologist and Protestant theologian. Berger became known for his work in the sociology of knowledge, the sociology of religion, study of modernization, and contributions to sociological theory.

Berger is arguably best known for his book, co-authored with Thomas Luckmann, The Social Construction of Reality: A Treatise in the Sociology of Knowledge (New York, 1966), which is considered one of the most influential texts in the sociology of knowledge and played a central role in the development of social constructionism. In 1998 the International Sociological Association named this book as the fifth most-influential book written in the field of sociology during the 20th century. In addition to this book, some of the other books that Berger has written include: Invitation to Sociology: A Humanistic Perspective (1963); A Rumor of Angels: Modern Society and the Rediscovery of the Supernatural (1969); and The Sacred Canopy: Elements of a Sociological Theory of Religion (1967).

Berger spent most of his career teaching at The New School for Social Research, at Rutgers University, and at Boston University. Before retiring, Berger had been at Boston University since 1981 and was the director of the Institute for the Study of Economic Culture.

== Biography ==
=== Family life ===
Peter Ludwig Berger was born on March 17, 1929, in Vienna, Austria, to George William and Jelka (Loew) Berger, who were Jewish converts to Christianity. He emigrated to the United States shortly after World War II in 1946 at the age of 17 and in 1952 he became a naturalized citizen. He died on June 27, 2017, in his Brookline, Massachusetts, home after a prolonged illness.

On September 28, 1959, he married Brigitte Kellner, herself an eminent sociologist who was on the faculty at Wellesley College and Boston University where she was the chair of the sociology department at both schools. Brigitte was born in Eastern Germany in 1928. She moved to the United States in the mid-1950s. She was a sociologist who focused on the sociology of the family, arguing that the nuclear family was one of the main causes of modernization. Although she studied traditional families, she supported same-sex relationships. She was on the faculties of Hunter College of the City University of New York, Long Island University, Wellesley College, and Boston University. Additionally, she was author of Societies in Change (1971), The Homeless Mind (1974), The War over the Family (1984), and The Family in the Modern Age (2002). Brigitte Kellner Berger died May 28, 2015.

They had two sons, Thomas Ulrich Berger and Michael George Berger. Thomas is himself a scholar of international relations, now a professor at the Pardee School of Global Studies at Boston University and author of War, Guilt and World Politics After World War II (2012) and Cultures of Antimilitarism: National Security in Germany and Japan (2003).

=== Education and career ===
After the Nazi takeover of Austria in 1938, Berger and his family emigrated to Palestine, then under British rule. He attended a British high school, St. Luke's. Following the German bombings of Haifa, he was evacuated to Mount Carmel, where he developed his life-long interest in religion. Berger became acquainted with the Bahá'í community in Haifa around 1945. This early encounter preceded his doctoral dissertation, From Sect to Church: A Sociological Interpretation of the Bahá'í Movement (1954), which was an early pioneering sociological study of the Bábí and Bahá'í religions. Drawing on Max Weber's concept of the routinization of charisma, Berger examined the transformation of the Bábí and Bahá'í movements into an independent religion. In 1947 Berger and his family emigrated again, this time to the United States, where they settled in New York City. Berger attended Wagner College for his Bachelor of Arts and received his MA and PhD from the New School for Social Research in New York in 1954. Berger, in his memoir, described himself as an "accidental sociologist", enrolling here in an effort to learn about American society and help become a Lutheran minister, and learning under Alfred Schütz. In 1955 and 1956 he worked at the Evangelische Akademie in Bad Boll, West Germany. From 1956 to 1958 Berger was an assistant professor at the University of North Carolina at Greensboro; from 1958 to 1963 he was an associate professor at Hartford Theological Seminary. The next stations in his career were professorships at the New School for Social Research, Rutgers University, and Boston College. Starting in 1981, Berger was the University Professor of Sociology and Theology at Boston University. He retired from BU in 2009. In 1985 he founded the Institute for the Study of Economic Culture, which later transformed into the Institute on Culture, Religion and World Affairs (CURA), and is now part of the Boston University Pardee School of Global Studies. He remained the Director of CURA from 1985 to 2010.

The original Peter L. Berger Papers are deposited in the Social Science Archive Konstanz.

== CURA ==
Berger founded the Institute on Culture, Religion, and World Affairs at Boston University in 1985. It is a world-center for research, education, and public scholarship on religion and world affairs. Some of the questions it attempts to answer are: How do religion and values affect political, economic, and public ethical developments around the world? Defying earlier forecasts, why have religious actors and ideas become more rather than less globally powerful in recent years? And in a world of increasing religious and ethical diversity, what are the implications of the revival of public religion for citizenship, democracy, and civil coexistence? CURA has over 140 projects in 40 countries.

== Religious views ==
Berger was a moderate Christian Lutheran conservative whose work in theology, secularization, and modernity at times has challenged the views of contemporary mainstream sociology, which tends to lean away from any right-wing political thinking. Ultimately, however, Berger's approach to sociology was humanist with special emphasis on "value-free" analysis.

== Sociological perspective ==
=== The social construction of reality ===
As explained in Berger's and Thomas Luckmann's book The Social Construction of Reality (1966), human beings construct a shared social reality. This reality includes things ranging from ordinary language to large-scale institutions. Our lives are governed by the knowledge about the world that we have and we use the information that is relevant to our lives. We take into account typificatory schemes, which are general assumptions about society. As one encounters a new scheme, one must compare it to the ones that are already established in one's mind and determine whether to keep those schemes or replace the old ones with new ones. Social structure is the total of all these typificatory schemes. While Alfred Schutz (1899–1959) did not elaborate a sociology of knowledge, Berger and Luckmann acknowledge the centrality of Schutz for their understanding of what theoretical ingredients ought to be added.

==== The reality of everyday life ====
Berger and Luckmann present "the reality of everyday life" as the sphere of reality that impinges upon human existence most intensely and immediately. Everyday life contrasts with other spheres of reality – dreamworlds, theatre – and is considered by a person to be objective, intersubjective (shared with others) and self-evident. Life is ordered spatially and temporally. Spatial ordering allows interaction with other people and objects; the human ability to manipulate zones of space can intersect with another's ability.

The reality of everyday life is taken for granted as reality. It does not require additional verification over and beyond its simple presence. It is simply there, as self-evident and compelling facticity.

Social interactions in everyday life favour personal, face-to-face encounters as the best scenarios where human beings can actually connect with each other through interactions. Humans perceive the other in these interactions as more real than they would themselves; we can place a person in everyday life by seeing them, yet we need to contemplate our own placement in the world, as it is not so concrete. Berger believes that although you know yourself on a much deeper scale than you would the other person, they are more real to you because they are constantly making "What he is" available to you. It is difficult to recognize "What I am" without separating oneself from the conversation and reflecting on it. Even then, that self-reflection is caused by the other person's interactions leading to that self contemplation.

Language is imperative to the understanding of everyday life. People understand knowledge through language. The knowledge relevant to us is the only necessary knowledge to our survival, but humans interact through sharing and connecting the relevant structures of our lives with each other. Language helps create shared symbols and stocks of knowledge, and participation in these things inherently makes us participate in society.

==== Social reality on two levels ====
Social reality exists at both the subjective and objective levels. At the subjective level, people find reality personally meaningful and created by human beings in aspects such as personal friendships. At the objective level, people find reality in aspects such as government bureaucracies and large corporations, where reality is seen as more out of one's control.

==== Society as objective and subjective ====
Objectively, social order is a product of our social enterprise: it is an ongoing process that results from human activity. Institutions are a product of the historicity and need to control human habitualization (the repeated behaviours or patterns). The shared nature of these experiences and their commonality results in sedimentation, meaning they lose their memorability. Many behaviours lose sedimented institutional meanings. Institutional order involves specified roles for people to play. These roles are seen as performing as this objective figure – an employee is not judged as a human but by that role they have taken.

The process of building a socially-constructed reality takes place in three phases:

- Externalization is the first step in which humans pour out meaning (both mental and physical) into their reality, thus creating things through language. In externalization, social actors create their social worlds and it is seen through action.
- Following that, reality becomes established by the products of externalization through the course of objectivation (things and ideas "harden" in a sense). People see either a social practice or institution as an objective reality that cannot be changed, such as something like language.
- Lastly, this newly made and man-made reality (or society) has an effect on humans themselves. In this third phase, internalization, the external, objective world to a person becomes part of their internal, subjective world. As social actors we internalize norms and values, accepting them as givens, and make them our reality.

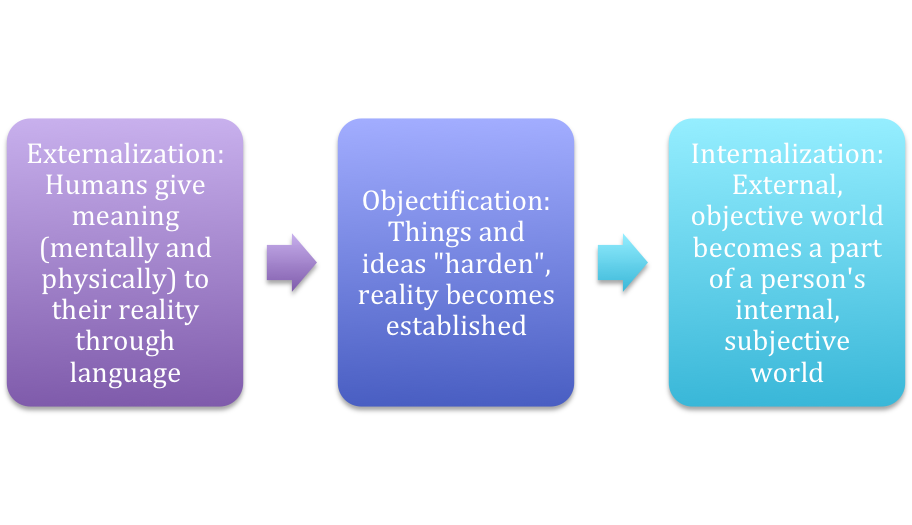
The social construction of reality

==== Levels of socialization ====
Subjectively, we experience first and second socializations into society. Firstly, family members and friends socialize one into the world during one's childhood. Secondly, during one's adulthood, one internalizes institutional "sub worlds" put in various positions in the economy. We maintain our subjective world through reaffirmation with social interactions with others. Our identity and our society are seen as dialectically related: our identity is formed by social processes, which are in turn ordered by our society. Berger and Luckmann see socialization as very powerful and able to influence things such as sexual and nutritional choices. People have the ability to do whatever they want in these spheres, but socialization causes people to only choose certain sexual partners or certain foods to eat to satisfy biological needs.

=== Humanistic perspective ===
The humanistic perspective is generally outside of mainstream, contemporary sociology. It is considered as a view that relates more to the humanities – literature, philosophy – than to social science. Its ultimate purpose lies in freeing society of illusions to help make it more humane. In this sense, we are the "puppets of society", but sociology allows us to see the strings that we are attached to, which helps to free ourselves. Berger's Invitation to Sociology outlines his approach to the field of sociology in these humanistic terms. Methodologically, sociologists should attempt to understand and observe human behaviour outside the context of its social setting and free from whatever influence a sociologist's personal biases or feelings might be. The study of sociology, Berger posits, should be value-free. Research should be accrued in the same manner as the scientific method, using observation, hypothesis, testing, data, analysis and generalization. The meaning derived from the results of research should be contextualized with historical, cultural, environmental, or other important data.

=== View of sociology ===
Berger saw the field of sociology as not only just a way to help people and the community, but sociological insights are also important to all people interested in instilling action in society. Sociologists are a part of a multitude of fields, not just social work. Berger stated that sociology is not a practice, but an attempt to understand the social world. These understandings could be used by people in any field for whatever purpose and with whatever moral implications. He believed that sociologists, even if their values varied greatly, should at the very least have scientific integrity. Sociologists are only humans and will still have to deal with things such as convictions, emotions, and prejudices, but being trained in sociology should learn to understand and control these things and try to eliminate them from their work. A sociologist's job is to accurately report on a certain social terrain. Sociology is a science, and its findings are found through observation of certain rules of evidence that allow people to repeat and continue to develop the findings.

== Religion and society ==
=== Religion and the human problems of modernity ===
Berger believed that society is made aware of what he referred to as the nomos, or the patterns a particular society wants its members to see as objectively right and to internalize. The nomos is all the society's knowledge about how things are, and all of its values and ways of living. This is upheld through legitimacy, either giving special meaning to these behaviors or by creating a structure of knowledge that enhances the plausibility of the nomos. The existence of an eternal cosmic entity that legitimizes a nomos makes the nomos itself eternal; an individual's actions within its set society are all based on a universal and orderly pattern based on their beliefs.

Modern pluralization, which has stemmed from the Protestant Reformation in the 16th century, set forth a new set of values, including: separation of the religious and secular spheres of life, a person's wealth as a determinant of value, maximizing freedom to enhance wealth, increasing prediction and control to increase wealth, and identifying oneself as a member of a nation-state. This, in turn, spread capitalism and its ideals and beliefs of individualism and rationalization and separated Christians from their God. With globalization, even more beliefs and cultures were confronted with this.

Berger believed that modernity – technological production paradigms of thinking and bureaucracy, namely – alienated the individual from primary institutions and forced individuals to create separate spheres of public and private life. There is no plausibility structure for any system of beliefs in the modern world; people are made to choose their own with no anchors to our own perceptions of reality. This lowers feelings of belonging and forces our own subjectivities onto themselves. Berger called this a "homelessness of the mind." It is the product of the modern world, he believed, as it has transformed the technology of production into our consciousness, making our cognition componential, always searching for a "means to an end." Ideas and beliefs are varied in the modern world, and an individual, not sharing their system of beliefs with the public whole, relegates any behaviors that are contingent on it to their private life. Certain beliefs that an individual has that may not be widely accepted by society as a whole, are then kept to one's self and may only be seen within one's private life and are not seen by society.

The socialist myth, a non-pejorative term of Berger's, actually arises from intellectual leftism masking a need to resolve the lacking sense of community in the modern world through the promise to destroy the oppression of capitalism. Berger believed resolving community in modern society needs to emphasize the role of "mediating structures" in their lives to counter the alienation of modernity. Human existence in the age of modernity requires there to be structures like church, neighbourhood, and family to help establish a sense of belonging rooted in a commitment to values or beliefs. This builds a sense of community and belonging in an individual. In addition, these structures can serve a role in addressing larger social problems without the alienation that larger society creates. The role of mediating structures in civil society is both private and public, in this sense.

=== Pluralism ===
The general meaning of pluralism is the coexistence, generally peaceful, of different religions, worldviews, and value systems within the same society. Berger believes pluralism exists in two ways. The first being that many religions and worldviews coexist in the same society. The second is the coexistence of the secular discourse with all these religious discourses. Some people avoid pluralism by only operating within their own secular or religious discourse, meaning they do not interact with others outside of their beliefs.

A feature of pluralism generally today is that it is globalized. Berger sees benefits in pluralism. One is that very rarely is there complete consensus in beliefs; this allows people to form and hold their own differing beliefs: society is such that people do not all try to hold and conform to the same beliefs. This ties into a second benefit: that pluralism gives freedom and allows people free decisions.

A third benefit is that – if pluralism is connected to religious freedom – then religious institutions now become voluntary associations. Lastly, pluralism influences individual believers and religious communities to define the core of their faith separately from its less central elements. This allows people to pick and choose between certain aspects of their chosen form of belief – that they may or may not agree with – while still remaining true to the central parts of it.

=== Transcendence ===
In daily life, people experience symbols and glimpses of existence beyond empirical order and of transcendent existence. Berger calls these "rumours of angels". People feel in times of great joy, in never-ending pursuit of order against chaos, in the existence of objective evil, and in the sense of hope that there exists some supernatural reality beyond that of human existence. People who choose to believe in the existence of a supernatural other require faith – a wager of belief against doubt – in the modern rationalised world. Knowledge can no longer sufficiently ground human belief in the pluralized world, forcing people to wager their own beliefs against the current of doubt in our society.

=== Secularization theory ===
Like most other sociologists of religion of his day, Berger once predicted the all-encompassing secularization of the world. He has admitted to his own miscalculations about secularization, concluding that the existence of resurgent religiosity in the modernised world has proven otherwise. In The Desecularization of the World, he cites both Western academia and Western Europe itself as exceptions to the triumphant desecularization hypothesis: that these cultures have remained highly secularized despite the resurgence of religion in the rest of the world. Berger finds that his and most sociologists' misconsensus about secularization may have been the result of their own bias as members of academia, which is a largely atheist concentration of people.

== Theoretical contributions ==
In Making Sense of Modern Times: Peter L. Berger and the Vision of Interpretive Sociology, James Davison Hunter and Stephen C. Ainlay build upon the social theories of Berger's. Hunter and Ainlay use Berger's ideologies as a foundation and framework for this particular book. Nicholas Abercrombie begins by examining his reformation of the sociology of knowledge. Shifting his focus on the subjective reality of everyday life, Berger enters a dialogue with traditional sociologies of knowledge – more specific, those of Karl Marx and Karl Mannheim. Abercrombie digs deeper into this dialogue Berger brings up, and he considers ways in which Berger goes beyond these figures. Stephen Ainlay then pursues the notable influence on Berger's work.

In the field of sociology, Berger has been somewhat excluded from the mainstream; his humanistic perspective was denounced by much of the intellectual elite in the field, though it sold well over a million copies. Berger's leftist criticisms do not help him much in that regard either. Berger's theories on religion have held considerable weight in contemporary neoconservative and theological fields of thinking, however.

In 1987 Berger argued about the emergence of a new social class he called the "knowledge class". He views it as a result of what was known as the middle class into two groups: the "old middle class" of those who produce material goods and services and the "knowledge class" whose occupations relate to the production and distribution of "symbolic knowledge." He followed Helmut Schelsky's definition of Sinn- und Hellsvermittler, "agents (intemediaries) of meanings and purposes".

== Influences ==
Berger's work was notably influenced by Max Weber. Weber focused on the empirical realities of rationality as a characteristic of action and rationalization. In comparison, Berger proposed the usage of the word 'options' rather than freedom as an empirical concept. Therefore, much of the empirical work of Berger and Weber have revolved around the relationship between modern rationalization and options for social action. Weber argued that rationalism can mean a variety of things at the subjective level of consciousness and at the objective level of social institutions. The connection between Berger's analysis of the sociology of religion in modern society and Max Weber's The Protestant Ethic and the Spirit of Capitalism aligns. Weber saw capitalism as a result of the Protestant secularization of work ethic and morality in amassing wealth, which Berger integrates into his analysis about the effects of losing the non-secular foundations for belief about life's ultimate meaning.

Berger's own experiences teaching in North Carolina in the 1950s showed the shocking American prejudice of that era's Southern culture and influenced his humanistic perspective as a way to reveal the ideological forces from which it stemmed.

== Honors ==
Berger was elected a Fellow of the American Academy of Arts and Sciences in 1982. He was doctor honoris causa of Loyola University Chicago, Wagner College, the College of the Holy Cross, the University of Notre Dame, the University of Geneva, and LMU Munich, and an honorary member of many scientific associations.

In 2010, he was awarded the Dr. Leopold Lucas Prize by the University of Tübingen.

== Works ==
- The Precarious Vision: A Sociologist Looks at Social Fictions and Christian Faith (1961)
- The Noise of Solemn Assemblies (1961)
- Invitation to Sociology: A Humanistic Perspective (1963)
- The Social Construction of Reality: A Treatise in the Sociology of Knowledge (1966) with Thomas Luckmann. New York : Doubleday.
- The Sacred Canopy: Elements of a Sociological Theory of Religion (1967)
- A Rumor of Angels: Modern Society and the Rediscovery of the Supernatural (1969)
- Movement and Revolution (1970) with Richard John Neuhaus
- Sociology (1972) with Brigitte Berger. Basic Books. – Dutch translation: Sociologie (1972). Basisboeken
- The Homeless Mind: Modernization and Consciousness (1973) with Brigitte Berger and Hansfried Kellner. Random House
- Pyramids of Sacrifice: Political Ethics and Social Change (1974)
- Facing Up to Modernity: Excursions in Society, Politics and Religion (1979)
- The Heretical Imperative: Contemporary Possibilities of Religious Affirmation (1979)
- Sociology Reinterpreted, (with Hansfried Kellner) (1981)
- The Other Side of God: A Polarity in World Religions (editor, 1981)
- The War Over the Family: Capturing the Middle Ground (1983) with Brigitte Berger
- The Capitalist Revolution (1986) New York: Basic Books
- The Capitalist Spirit: Toward a Religious Ethic of Wealth Creation (editor, 1990)
- A Far Glory: The Quest for Faith in an Age of Credulity (1992)
- Redeeming Laughter: The Comic Dimension of Human Experience (1997)
- Four Faces of Global Culture (The National Interest, Fall 1997)
- The Limits of Social Cohesion: Conflict and Mediation in Pluralist Societies: A Report of the Bertelsmann Foundation to the Club of Rome (1998)
- The Desecularization of the World: Resurgent Religion and World Politics (editor, et al., 1999)
- Peter Berger and the Study of Religion (edited by Linda Woodhead et al., 2001; includes a Postscript by Berger)
- Many Globalizations: Cultural Diversity in the Contemporary World (2002) with Samuel P. Huntington. Oxford University Press
- Questions of Faith: A Skeptical Affirmation of Christianity (2003). Blackwell Publishing
- Religious America, Secular Europe? (with Grace Davie and Effie Fokas) (2008)
- In Praise of Doubt: How to Have Convictions Without Becoming a Fanatic (2009) with Anton Zijderveld. HarperOne
- Dialogue Between Religious Traditions in an Age of Relativity (2011) Mohr Siebeck
- The Many Altars of Modernity. Towards a Paradigm for Religion in a Pluralist Age (2014)
- Adventures of an Accidental Sociologist: How to Explain the World Without Becoming a Bore (2011) Prometheus Books
- Worldview Magazine (1972–1981)
