= Sociology of religion =

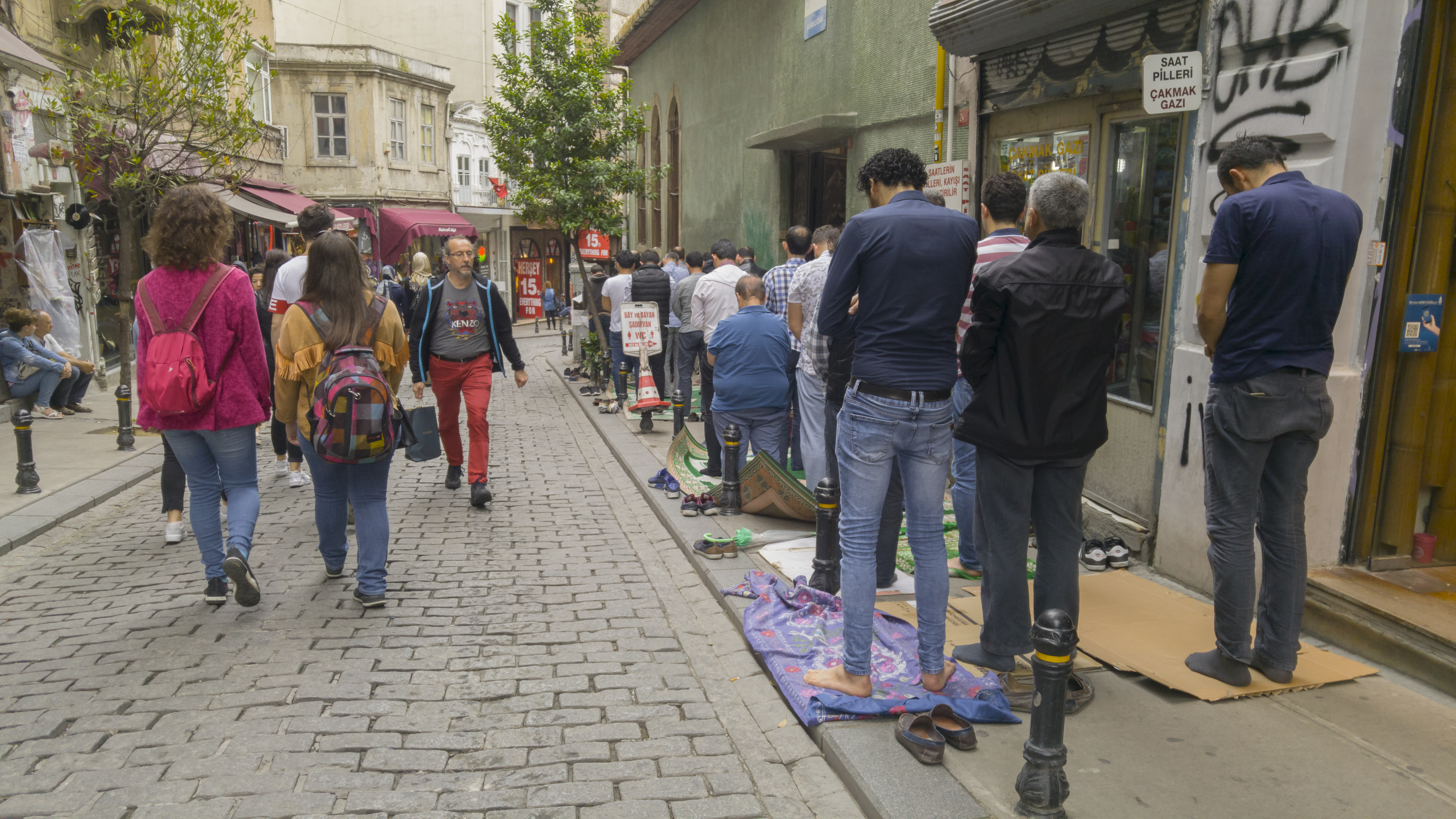
Muslims praying in the streets of Istanbul

Sociology of religion is the study of the beliefs, practices and organizational forms of religion using the tools and methods of the discipline of sociology. This objective investigation may include the use both of quantitative methods (surveys, polls, demographic and census analysis) and of qualitative approaches (such as participant observation, interviewing, and analysis of archival, historical and documentary materials).

Modern sociology as an academic discipline began with the analysis of religion in Émile Durkheim's 1897 study of suicide rates among Catholic and Protestant populations, a foundational work of social research which served to distinguish sociology from other disciplines, such as psychology. The works of Karl Marx (1818–1883) and Max Weber (1864–1920) emphasized the relationship between religion and the economic or social structure of society. Contemporary debates have centered on issues such as secularization, civil religion, and the cohesiveness of religion in the context of globalization and multiculturalism. Contemporary sociology of religion may also encompass the sociology of irreligion (for instance, in the analysis of secular-humanist belief systems).

The sociology of religion is distinguished from the philosophy of religion in that it does not set out to assess the validity of religious beliefs. The process of comparing multiple conflicting dogmas may require what Peter L. Berger has described as inherent "methodological atheism". Whereas the sociology of religion broadly differs from theology in assuming indifference to the supernatural, theorists tend to acknowledge socio-cultural reification of religious practice.

== Classical sociology ==
Classical, seminal sociological theorists of the late 19th and early 20th century such as Émile Durkheim, Max Weber, and Karl Marx were greatly interested in religion and its effects on society. Like those of Plato and Aristotle from ancient Greece, and Enlightenment philosophers from the 17th through 19th centuries, the ideas posited by these sociologists continue to be examined today. Durkheim, Marx, and Weber had very complex and developed theories about the nature and effects of religion. Of these, Durkheim and Weber are often more difficult to understand, especially in light of the lack of context and examples in their primary texts. Religion was considered to be an extremely important social variable in the work of all three.

=== Karl Marx ===
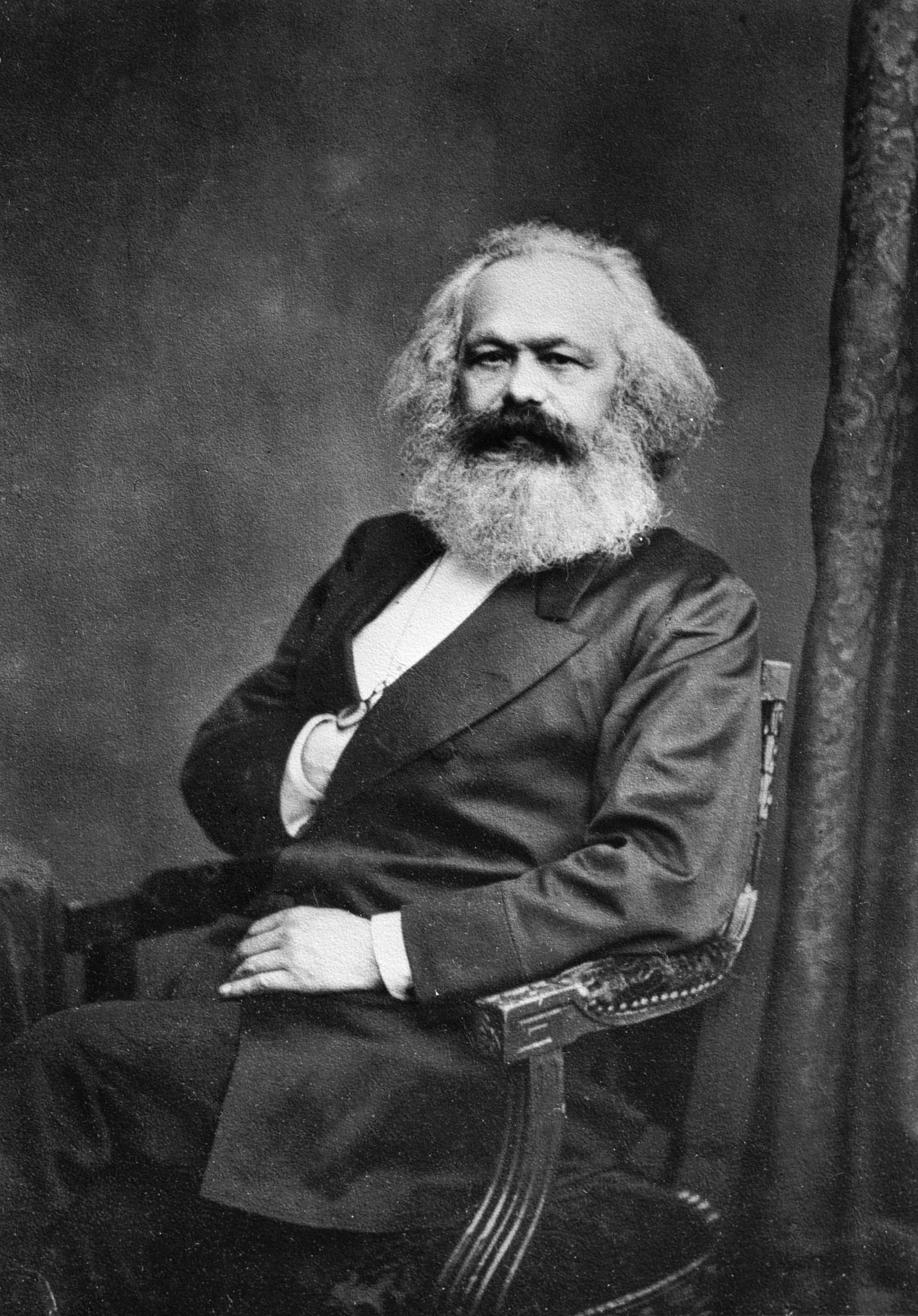
Karl Marx

According to Kevin J. Christiano, "Marx was the product of the Enlightenment, embracing its call to replace faith by reason and religion by science." But he "did not believe in science for science's sake … he believed that he was also advancing a theory that would … be a useful tool … [in] effecting a revolutionary upheaval of the capitalist system in favor of socialism."

As such, the crux of his arguments was that humans are best guided by reason. Religion, Marx held, was a significant hindrance to reason, inherently masking the truth and misguiding followers. Marx viewed alienation as the heart of social inequality. The antithesis to this alienation is freedom. Thus, to propagate freedom means to present individuals with the truth and give them a choice to accept or deny it. In this, "Marx never suggested that religion ought to be prohibited."

Central to Marx's theories was the oppressive economic situation in which he dwelt. With the rise of European industrialism, Marx and his colleague Friedrich Engels witnessed and responded to the growth of what he called "surplus value". Marx's view of capitalism saw rich capitalists getting richer and their workers getting poorer (the gap, the exploitation, was the "surplus value"). Not only were workers getting exploited, but in the process they were being further detached from the products they helped create. By simply selling their work for wages, "workers simultaneously lose connection with the object of labor and become objects themselves. Workers are devalued to the level of a commodity – a thing …" From this objectification comes alienation. The common worker is led to believe that he or she is a replaceable tool, and is alienated to the point of extreme discontent. Here, in Marx's eyes, religion enters. Capitalism utilizes our tendency towards religion as a tool or ideological state apparatus to justify this alienation. Christianity teaches that those who gather up riches and power in this life will almost certainly not be rewarded in the next ("it is harder for a rich man to enter the Kingdom of Heaven than it is for a camel to pass through the eye of a needle …") while those who suffer oppression and poverty in this life while cultivating their spiritual wealth will be rewarded in the Kingdom of God. Hence Marx's famous line – "religion is the opium of the people", as it soothes them and dulls their senses to the pain of oppression. Some scholars have recently noted that this is a contradictory (or dialectical) metaphor, referring to religion as both an expression of suffering and a protest against suffering.

Émile Durkheim

=== Émile Durkheim ===
Émile Durkheim placed himself in the positivist tradition, meaning that he thought of his study of society as dispassionate and scientific. He was deeply interested in the problem of what held complex modern societies together. Religion, he argued, was an expression of social cohesion.

In the field work that led to his famous Elementary Forms of Religious Life, Durkheim, a secular Frenchman, looked at anthropological data of Indigenous Australians. His underlying interest was to understand the basic forms of religious life for all societies. In Elementary Forms, Durkheim argues that the totems the Aborigines venerate are actually expressions of their own conceptions of society itself. This is true not only for the Aborigines, he argues, but for all societies.

Religion, for Durkheim, was not "imaginary", although he did deprive it of what many believers find essential. Religion is very real; it is an expression of society itself, and indeed, there is no society that does not have religion. We perceive as individuals a force greater than ourselves, which is our social life, and give that perception a supernatural face. We then express ourselves religiously in groups, which for Durkheim makes the symbolic power greater. Religion is an expression of our collective consciousness, which is the fusion of all of our individual consciousnesses, which then creates a reality of its own.

It follows, then, that less complex societies, such as the Australian Aborigines, have less complex religious systems, involving totems associated with particular clans. The more complex a particular society, the more complex the religious system is. As societies come in contact with other societies, there is a tendency for religious systems to emphasize universalism to a greater and greater extent. However, as the division of labour makes the individual seem more important (a subject that Durkheim treats extensively in his famous The Division of Labour in Society), religious systems increasingly focus on individual salvation and conscience.

Durkheim's definition of religion, from Elementary Forms, is as follows: "A religion is a unified system of beliefs and practices relative to sacred things, that is to say, things set apart and forbidden – beliefs and practices which unite into one single moral community called a Church, all those who adhere to them." This is a functional definition of religion, meaning that it explains what religion does in social life: essentially, it unites societies. Durkheim defined religion as a clear distinction between the sacred and the profane, in effect this can be paralleled with the distinction between God and humans.

This definition also does not stipulate what exactly may be considered sacred. Thus later sociologists of religion (notably Robert Neelly Bellah) have extended Durkheimian insights to talk about notions of civil religion, or the religion of a state. American civil religion, for example, might be said to have its own set of sacred "things": the flag of the United States, Abraham Lincoln, Martin Luther King Jr., etc. Other sociologists have taken Durkheim's concept of what religion is in the direction of the religion of professional sports, the military, or of rock music.

=== Max Weber ===
Max Weber published four major texts on religion in a context of economic sociology and his rationalization thesis: The Protestant Ethic and the Spirit of Capitalism (1905), The Religion of China: Confucianism and Taoism (1915), The Religion of India: The Sociology of Hinduism and Buddhism (1915), and Ancient Judaism (1920).

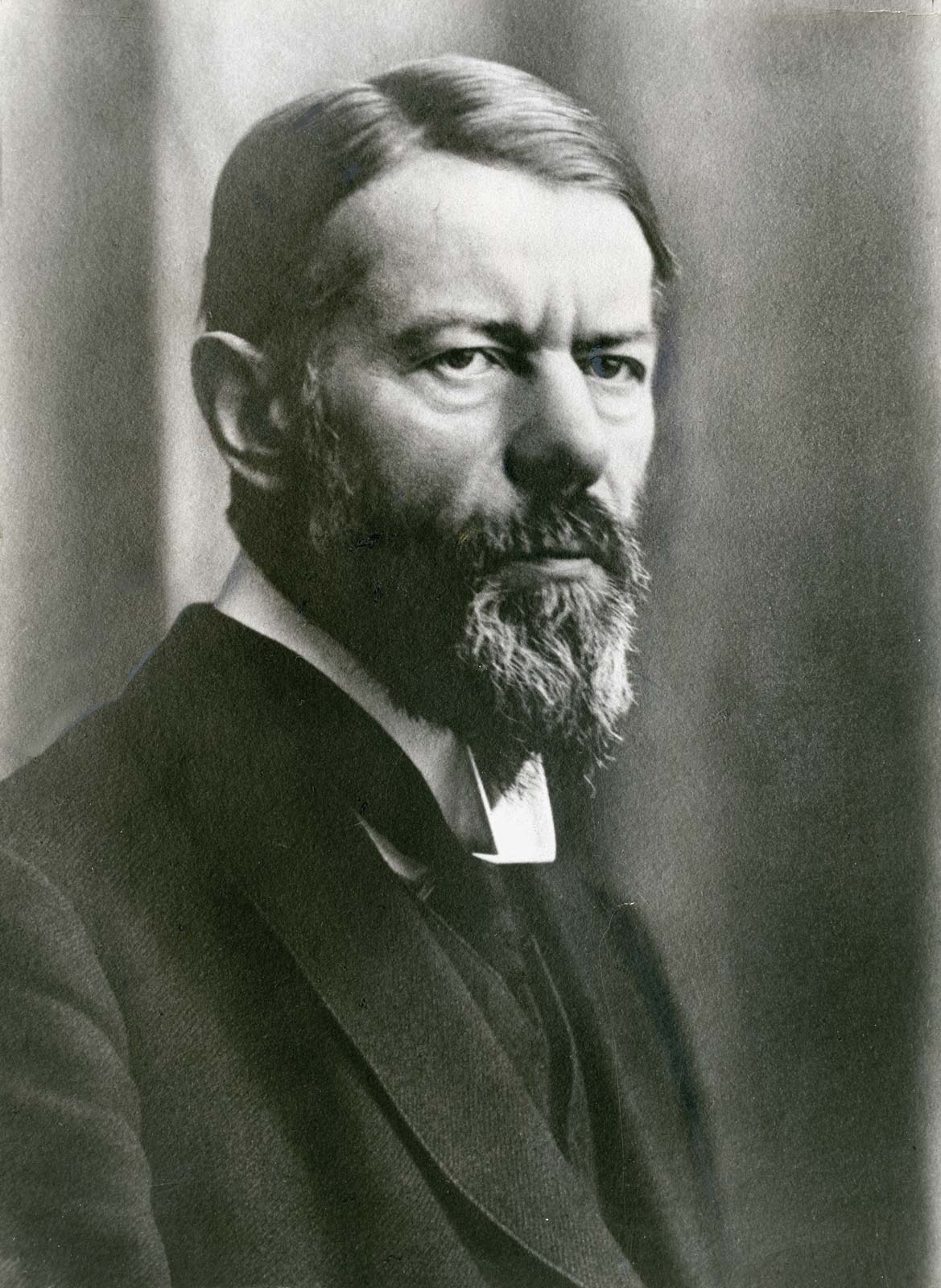
Max Weber

In his sociology, Weber uses the German term "Verstehen" to describe his method of interpretation of the intention and context of human action. Weber is not a positivist; he does not believe we can find out "facts" in sociology that can be causally linked. Although he believes some generalized statements about social life can be made, he is not interested in hard positivist claims, but instead in linkages and sequences, in historical narratives and particular cases.

Weber argues for making sense of religious action on its own terms. A religious group or individual is influenced by all kinds of things, he says, but if they claim to be acting in the name of religion, we should attempt to understand their perspective on religious grounds first. Weber gives religion credit for shaping a person's image of the world, and this image of the world can affect their view of their interests, and ultimately how they decide to take action.

For Weber, religion is best understood as it responds to the human need for theodicy and soteriology. Human beings are troubled, he says, with the question of theodicy – the question of how the extraordinary power of a divine god may be reconciled with the imperfection of the world that he has created and rules over. People need to know, for example, why there is undeserved good fortune and suffering in the world. Religion offers people soteriological answers, or answers that provide opportunities for salvation – relief from suffering, and reassuring meaning. The pursuit of salvation, like the pursuit of wealth, becomes a part of human motivation.

Because religion helps to define motivation, Weber believed that religion (and specifically Calvinism) actually helped to give rise to modern capitalism, as he asserted in his most famous and controversial work, The Protestant Ethic and the Spirit of Capitalism.

In The Protestant Ethic, Weber argues that capitalism arose in Europe in part because of how the belief in predestination was interpreted by everyday English Puritans. Puritan theology was based on the Calvinist notion that not everyone would be saved; there was only a specific number of the elect who would avoid damnation, and this was based sheerly on God's predetermined will and not on any action you could perform in this life. Official doctrine held that one could not ever really know whether one was among the elect.

Practically, Weber noted, this was difficult psychologically: people were (understandably) anxious to know whether they would be eternally damned or not. Thus Puritan leaders began assuring members that if they began doing well financially in their businesses, this would be one unofficial sign they had God's approval and were among the saved – but only if they used the fruits of their labour well. This along with the rationalism implied by monotheism led to the development of rational bookkeeping and the calculated pursuit of financial success beyond what one needed simply to live – and this is the "spirit of capitalism". Over time, the habits associated with the spirit of capitalism lost their religious significance, and the rational pursuit of profit became an aim in its own right.

The Protestant Ethic thesis has been much critiqued, refined, and disputed, but is still a lively source of theoretical debate in sociology of religion. Weber also did considerable work on world religions, including Hinduism and Buddhism.

In his magnum opus Economy and Society Weber distinguished three ideal types of religious attitudes:

1. world-flying mysticism
2. world-rejecting asceticism
3. inner-worldly asceticism.

He also separated magic as pre-religious activity.

== Theoretical perspectives ==
=== Symbolic anthropology and phenomenology ===
Symbolic anthropology and some versions of phenomenology argue that all humans require reassurance that the world is safe and ordered place – that is, they have a need for ontological security. Therefore, all societies have forms of knowledge that perform this psychological task. The inability of science to offer psychological and emotional comfort explains the presence and influence of non-scientific knowledge in human lives, even in rational world.

=== Functionalism ===
As scientific and evidence based research emerged, scholars began examining the function of religion as acts or movements within societies. Thus, functionalism points to the benefits for social organization which non-scientific belief systems explain and scientific knowledge fails to deliver. From this perspective, belief systems are seen as encouraging social order and social stability in ways that rationally based knowledge cannot.

From a functionalist perspective, societal contexts plays an important role in determining the purposes of religion and religious acts. By framing belief systems and acts as religious, the classification alone can influence societal views and actions. Therefore, the functionalist perspective also seeks to determine whose interests are benefited (and disadvantaged) from religious activities, revealing the wider social implications and incentives.

Another important aspect of the functionalist view is how religion unites individuals with shared interests and values, fostering support and community. For instance, religious organizations often host communal social events that bring people together. Recent studies further extend this idea to large-scale communities, indicating that religion promotes social capital across societies by encouraging prosocial behaviors and a sense of collectivity.

=== Rationalism ===
Rationalists object to the phenomenological and functionalist approaches, arguing that these approaches fail to understand why believers in systems of non-scientific knowledge think that their ideas are right, even when science has shown them to be wrong. Rationalists say that one cannot explain forms of knowledge in terms of the beneficial psychological or societal effects that an outside observer may see them as producing and emphasize the importance of looking at the point of view of those who believe in them. People do not believe in God, practice magic, or think that witches cause misfortune because they think they are providing themselves with psychological reassurance, or to achieve greater social cohesion for their social groups.

Rationalists see the history of modern societies as the rise of scientific knowledge and the subsequent decline of non-rational belief. Some of these beliefs, such as magic and witchcraft, had disappeared, while others, such as religion, had become marginalized. This rationalist perspective has led to secularization theories of various kinds.

== Typology of religious groups ==
A diagram of the church-sect typology continuum including church, denomination, sect, cult, new religious movement, and institutionalized sect

One common typology among sociologists, religious groups are classified as ecclesias, denominations, sects, or cults (now more commonly referred to in scholarship as new religious movements). The church-sect typology has its origins in the work of Max Weber. There is a basic premise continuum along which religions fall, ranging from the protest-like orientation of sects to the equilibrium maintaining churches. This continuum includes several additional types. Note that sociologists give these words precise definitions which differ from how they are commonly used. In particular, sociologists use the words 'cult' and 'sect' without negative connotations, even though the popular use of these words is often pejorative.

Churches are the religious bodies that coexist in a relatively low state of tension with their social surrounding. They have mainstream "safe" beliefs and practices relative to those of the general population. This type of religious bodies are more world affirming, so they try to peacefully coexist with the secular world and are low-tension organizations.

Sects are high-tension organizations that don't fit well within the existing social environment. They are usually most attractive to society's least privileged- outcasts, minorities, or the poor- because they downplay worldly pleasure by stressing otherworldly promises. When church leaders become too involved in secular issues, sects start to splinter off the existing church. They may end up forming their own sect and if over time the sect picks up a significant following, it almost inevitably transforms into its own church, ultimately becoming part of the mainstream.

A cult is a religious movement that makes some new claim about the supernatural and therefore does not easily fit within the sect-church cycle. All religions began as cults, and their leaders offer new insights, claiming that they are the word of God. They are often high-tension movements that antagonize their social world and/or are antagonized by it.

Denomination lies between the church and the sect on the continuum. They come into existence when churches lose their religious monopoly in a society. When churches or sects become denominations, there are also some changes in their characteristics.

== Religiosity ==
Some sociologists of religion explore the theoretical analysis of the sociological dimensions of religiosity. For example, Charles Y. Glock is best known for his five-dimensional scheme of the nature of religious commitment. His list consist of the following variables: belief, knowledge, experience, practice (sometimes subdivided into private and public ritual) and consequences. Glock's first four dimensions have proved widely useful in research, because generally, they are simple to measure survey research. Similarly, Mervin F. Verbit's contribution was a twenty four-dimensional religiosity measure which includes measuring religiosity through six different "components" of religiosity: ritual, doctrine, emotion, knowledge, ethics, community, and along four dimensions: content, frequency, intensity, centrality.

== Secularization and civil religion ==
Secularism is the general movement away from religiosity and spiritual belief towards a rational, scientific, orientation, a trend observed in Muslim and Christian industrialized nations alike. In the United States of America, many politicians, court systems, schools, and businesses embrace secularism. In relation to the processes of rationalization associated with the development of modernity, it was predicted in the works of many classical sociologists that religion would decline. They claimed that there would be a separation of religion from the institutions such as the state, economy, and family. Despite the claims of many classical theorists and sociologists immediately after World War II, many contemporary theorists have critiqued secularization thesis, arguing that religion has continued to play a vital role in the lives of individuals worldwide. In the United States, in particular, church attendance has remained relatively stable in the past 40 years. In Africa, the emergence of Christianity has occurred at a high rate. While Africa could claim roughly 10 million Christians in 1900, recent estimates put that number closer to 200 million. The rise of Islam as a major world religion, especially its new-found influence in the West, is another significant development. Peter Berger, an American sociologist, considers secularization is the result of a larger sociostructural crisis in religion is caused by pluralism. Pluralism is the presence and engaged coexistence of numerous distinct groups in one society. The United States is both highly religious and pluralistic, standing out among other industrialized and wealthy nations in this regard. In short, presupposed secularization as a decline in religiosity might seem to be a myth, depending on its definition and the definition of its scope. For instance, some sociologists have argued that steady church attendance and personal religious belief may coexist with a decline in the influence of religious authorities on social or political issues. Additionally, regular attendance or affiliation do not necessarily translate into a behavior according to their doctrinal teachings.

=== Religious economy ===
According to Rodney Stark, David Martin was the first contemporary sociologist to reject the secularization theory outright. Martin even proposed that the concept of secularization be eliminated from social scientific discourse, on the grounds that it had only served ideological purposes and because there was no evidence of any general shift from a religious period in human affairs to a secular period. Stark is well known for pioneering, with William Sims Bainbridge, a theory of religious economy, according to which societies that restrict supply of religion, either through an imposed state religious monopoly or through state-sponsored secularization, are the main causes of drops in religiosity. Correspondingly, the more religions a society has, the more likely the population is to be religious. This contradicts the older view of secularization which states that if a liberal religious community is tolerant of a wide array of belief, then the population is less likely to hold certain beliefs in common, so nothing can be shared and reified in a community context, leading to a reduction in religious observance. The religious economy model sparked a lively debate among sociologists of religion on whether market models fit religious practices and on the extents to which this model of religious behavior is specific to the United States.

=== Peter Berger ===
Peter Berger observed that while researchers supporting the secularization theory have long maintained that religion must inevitably decline in the modern world, today, much of the world is as religious as ever. This points to the falsity of the secularization theory. On the other hand, Berger also notes that secularization may be indeed have taken hold in Europe, while the United States and other regions have continued to remain religious despite the increased modernity. Dr. Berger suggested that the reason for this may have to do with the education system; in Europe, teachers are sent by the educational authorities and European parents would have to put up with secular teaching, while in the United States, schools were for much of the time under local authorities, and American parents, however unenlightened, could fire their teachers. Berger also notes that unlike Europe, America has seen the rise of Evangelical Protestantism, or "born-again Christians".

=== Bryan Wilson ===
Bryan R. Wilson a writer on secularization, explores life in societies dominated by scientific knowledge. His work follows Max Weber's view that modern societies prioritize rationality, focusing on technical efficiency and practical solutions over existential questions, leading to a disenchanted world. Wilson argues that non-scientific systems, especially religions, have seen an irreversible decline in influence. While some dispute the secularization thesis, claiming that traditional religions have been replaced by new sects, individual spirituality, or functional alternatives like nationalism, Wilson views the rise in diverse non-scientific belief systems as evidence of religion's diminished central role in modern society.

=== Ernest Gellner ===
Unlike Wilson and Weber, Ernest Gellner (1974) acknowledges that there are drawbacks to living in a world whose main form of knowledge is confined to facts we can do nothing about and that provide us with no guidelines on how to live and how to organize ourselves. In this regard, we are worse off than pre-modern people, whose knowledge, while incorrect, at least provided them with prescriptions for living. However, Gellner insists that these disadvantages are far outweighed by the huge technological advances modern societies have experienced as a result of the application of scientific knowledge.

Gellner doesn't claim that non-scientific knowledge is in the process of dying out. For example, he accepts that religions in various forms continue to attract adherents. He also acknowledges that other forms of belief and meaning, such as those provided by art, music, literature, popular culture (a specifically modern phenomenon), drug taking, political protest, and so on are important for many people. Nevertheless, he rejects the relativist interpretation of this situation – that in modernity, scientific knowledge is just one of many accounts of existence, all of which have equal validity. This is because, for Gellner, such alternatives to science are profoundly insignificant since they are technically impotent, as opposed to science. He sees that modern preoccupations with meaning and being as a self-indulgence that is only possible because scientific knowledge has enabled our world to advance so far. Unlike those in pre-modern times, whose overriding priority is to get hold of scientific knowledge in order to begin to develop, we can afford to sit back in the luxury of our well-appointed world and ponder upon such questions because we can take for granted the kind of world science has constructed for us.

=== Michel Foucault ===
Michel Foucault was a post-structuralist who saw human existence as being dependent on forms of knowledge – discourses – that work like languages. Languages/discourses define reality for us. In order to think at all, we are obliged to use these definitions. The knowledge we have about the world is provided for us by the languages and discourses we encounter in the times and places in which we live our lives. Thus, who we are, what we know to be true, and what we think are discursively constructed.

Foucault defined history as the rise and fall of discourses. Social change is about changes in prevailing forms of knowledge. The job of the historian is to chart these changes and identify the reasons for them. Unlike rationalists, however, Foucault saw no element of progress in this process. To Foucault, what is distinctive about modernity is the emergence of discourses concerned with the control and regulation of the body. According to Foucault, the rise of body-centered discourses necessarily involved a process of secularization. Pre-modern discourses were dominated by religion, where things were defined as good and evil, and social life was centered around these concepts. With the emergence of modern urban societies, scientific discourses took over, and medical science was a crucial element of this new knowledge. Modern life became increasingly subject to medical control – the medical gaze, as Foucault called it.

The rise to power of science, and of medicine in particular, coincided with a progressive reduction of the power of religious forms of knowledge. For example, normality and deviance became more of a matter of health and illness than of good and evil, and the physician took over from the priest the role of defining, promoting, and healing deviance.

=== Other perspectives ===
BBC News reported on a study by physicists and mathematicians that attempted to use mathematical modelling (nonlinear dynamics) to predict future religious orientations of populations. The study suggests that religion is headed towards "extinction" in various nations where it has been on the decline: Australia, Austria, Canada, the Czech Republic, Finland, Ireland, the Netherlands, New Zealand and Switzerland. The model considers not only the changing number of people with certain beliefs, but also attempts to assign utility values of a belief in each nation.

Thomas Luckmann maintains that the sociology of religion should cease preoccupations with the traditional and institutionalized forms of religion. Luckmann points instead to the "religious problem" which is the "problem of individual existence." This is the case as with the advent of modernity, religious meaning making has shifted more into the individual domain.

== Globalization ==
The sociology of religion continues to grow throughout the world, attempting to understand the relationship between religion and globalization. Two older approaches to globalization include modernization theory, a functionalist derivative, and world-systems theory, a Marxist approach. One of the differences between these theories is whether they view capitalism as positive or problematic. However, both assumed that modernization and capitalism would diminish the hold of religion.

To the contrary, as globalization intensified many different cultures started to look into different religions and incorporate different beliefs into society. New interpretations emerged that recognize the tensions. For example, according to Paul James and Peter Mandaville:

Religion and globalization have been intertwined with each other since the early empires attempted to extend their reach across what they perceived to be world-space. Processes of globalization carried religious cosmologies – including traditional conceptions of universalism – to the corners of the world, while these cosmologies legitimated processes of globalization. This dynamic of inter-relation has continued to the present, but with changing and sometimes new and intensifying contradictions.

== Latin American Sociology of Religion ==
Olga Odgers notes that in recent decades, there have been important developments in Latin American writing within the subspecialty of the sociology of religion, as the field itself has also shifted from "sociology about Latin American religion" to a "Latin American sociology of religion", taking contemporary Latin American forms of religiosity as an empirical referent, then goes even further to propose interpretive frameworks and new methodologies that contribute to the understanding of religious phenomena at a global level.

Roberto Blancarte, according to Odgers, identifies three main periods in the development of a Latin American sociology of religion:

1. First Period (From the birth of the sociology of religion until World War II): Religion, especially Catholicism, was viewed as a traditional cultural aspect that would eventually fade away. Scholars considered it a subject better suited for historians or anthropologists rather than sociologists. The primary focus was on Catholicism due to its formal dominance and special relationship with the state across Latin America.
2. Second Period (1970s to Early 21st Century): This period saw a significant shift due to the increasing religious diversity in the region, termed the "explosion of pluralism." Scholars began moving away from classical paradigms, such as the secularization thesis, and sought new frameworks that could more accurately capture the complex religious landscape of Latin America.
3. Third Period (Early 21st Century Onwards): Marked by a surge of interest from a new generation of sociologists, this period involved innovative approaches and research methods that moved beyond past theories. Scholars began producing original data, interpretations, and theoretical perspectives that not only advanced the study of religion in Latin America but also contributed to understanding global religious transformations.

Due to its complex nature, several studies demonstrated growing interest in understanding the religious context in relation to the multiple global processes playing out across the subcontinent, such as marginalization, ethnicity, migration, aging, and education.

== Religion and the social landscape ==
Not only does religion shape large-scale social institutions such as government and social movements, it plays a part in families, race, gender, class, and age – things involved in everyday lives.

=== Families ===
One of the biggest indicators of religiosity in adulthood is the religious atmosphere within families and upbringing, given that religious beliefs and practices are passed on from generation to generation. Depending on the type of religion in the family, it can involve a different familial structure. For example, practising Catholics tend to have larger families since the Catholic church is opposed to both contraception and abortion.

Children receive a religious legacy from their parents and from the society immediately surrounding them, through instruction and (intentionally or unintentionally) through the power of example that is shaped by values, personality, and interests. Their religious legacy may include induction into organizations and into civic or secular religions.

Their religious legacy is among the factors that condition people throughout their lives, although people as individuals have diverse reactions to their legacies. To outsiders who know them, people are identified in part by their religious legacy. For example, people born and raised in Hindu, Jewish, or American families have identities as Hindus, Jews, or Americans, independently of their beliefs or actions. People who do not embrace their religious legacy retain it nonetheless, and are characterized by terms such as lapsed, not observant, or unpatriotic. People who actually separate themselves from their religious legacy are termed apostates or traitors and may be subject to punishment.

=== Religion and gender ===
Research reports presented that women are universally more religious across all religions and cultures based largely on the fact that researchers are studying Western religions and cultures. In United States, Women are 60% likely to claim that " religion is very important in their lives ", while men are reported only 47%. Women attend religious services at least once a week are 12% higher than men in United States.

This phenomenon is explained by the Nature argument, Nurture argument and Role identity. According to the Nature arguments, rational choice theorists argue that higher level of religiosity among women derives from risk-aversion. Rational choice theory argues that people naturally minimise costs and maximise benefits for themselves. Women are " typically risk-averse", therefore they will be more inclined towards practicing religion. According to the Nurture argument, Marta Trzebiatowska and Steve Bruce claimed that "nothing in the biological make-up of men and women explains the gendered difference in religiosity", the difference are better explained by a range of socialisation process. Example used are women's major role in family, childbirth, and death. These events keeps them "closer to religion than man".

Marta Trzebiatowska and Steve Bruce argued there has been a time lag in how secularisation has affected men and women. As more and more women enter the work force, the religious gender gap is expected to disappear. Persuasive evidence across countries suggests that the gender gap can be explained in part by male and female identified role inside and outside of family and work. Women who work are more likely to feel they need to conform to the dominant secular ethos. Women who are at home focus on raising children and caring for sick and elderly family members which encourages stronger religious commitment.

Some religions are gendered social institution. Traditionalist evangelicals present that wifely submission- wives should defer their husbands in family decision-making. Evangelical women, rather, claimed the weakness in men proves that both wife and husband should hold mutual submission.Both spouses follow Christ's model of self-sacrifice and an orientation to the other person in family decision-making.

== See also ==
- Economics of religion
- List of religious populations
- Religion in politics
- Religious capital
- Religious conversion
- Secular religion
- State religion
