= Lifeworld =

Epistemological concept

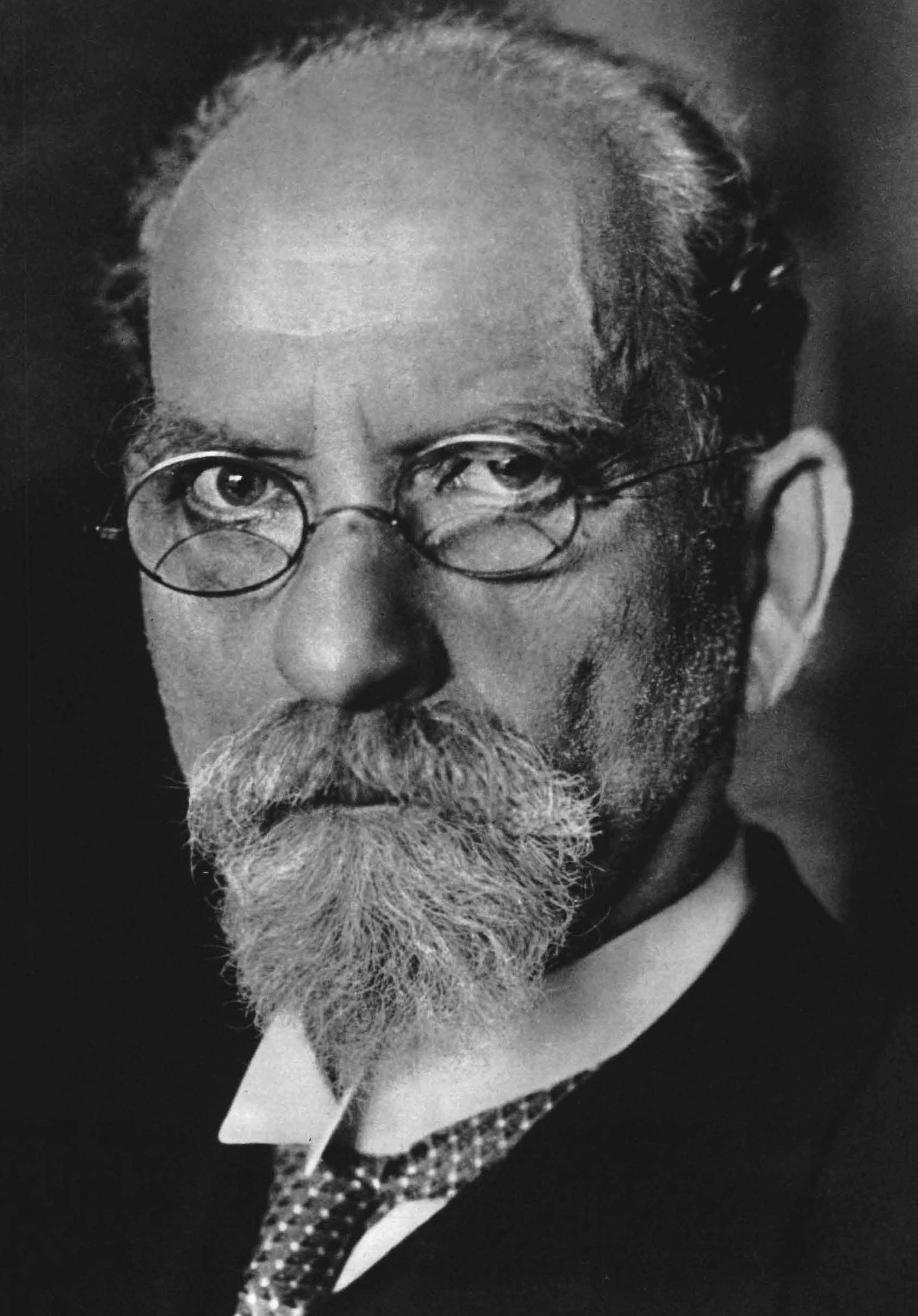
Edmund Husserl introduced the concept of lifeworld

Lifeworld (or life-world; German: Lebenswelt) may be conceived as a universe of what is self-evident or given, a world that subjects may experience together. The concept was popularized by Edmund Husserl, who emphasized its role as the ground of all knowledge in lived experience. It has its origin in biology and cultural Protestantism.

The lifeworld concept is used in philosophy and in some social sciences, particularly sociology, human geography, and anthropology. The concept emphasizes a state of affairs in which the world is experienced, the world is lived (German erlebt). The lifeworld is a pre-epistemological stepping stone for phenomenological analysis in the Husserlian tradition.

== Phenomenology ==
Edmund Husserl introduced the concept of the lifeworld in his The Crisis of European Sciences and Transcendental Phenomenology (1936):

In whatever way we may be conscious of the world as universal horizon, as coherent universe of existing objects, we, each "I-the-man" and all of us together, belong to the world as living with one another in the world; and the world is our world, valid for our consciousness as existing precisely through this 'living together.' We, as living in wakeful world-consciousness, are constantly active on the basis of our passive having of the world... Obviously this is true not only for me, the individual ego; rather we, in living together, have the world pre-given in this together, belong, the world as world for all, pre-given with this ontic meaning... The we-subjectivity... [is] constantly functioning.

This collective inter-subjective pool of perceiving, Husserl explains, is both universally present and, for humanity's purposes, capable of arriving at 'objective truth,' or at least as close to objectivity as possible. The 'lifeworld' is a grand theatre of objects variously arranged in space and time relative to perceiving subjects, is already-always there, and is the "ground" for all shared human experience. Husserl's formulation of the lifeworld was also influenced by Wilhelm Dilthey's "life-nexus" (German Lebenszusammenhang) and Martin Heidegger's Being-in-the-world (German In-der-Welt-Sein). The concept was further developed by students of Husserl such as Maurice Merleau-Ponty, Jan Patočka, and Alfred Schütz. The lifeworld can be thought of as the horizon of all our experiences, in the sense that it is that background on which all things appear as themselves and meaningful. The lifeworld cannot, however, be understood in a purely static manner; it is not an unchangeable background, but rather a dynamic horizon in which we live, and which "lives with us" in the sense that nothing can appear in our lifeworld except as lived.

The concept represented a turning point in Husserl's phenomenology from the tradition of Descartes and Kant. Up until then, Husserl had been focused on finding, elucidating, and explaining an absolute foundation of philosophy in consciousness, without any presuppositions except what can be found through the reflective analysis of consciousness and what is immediately present to it. Originally, all judgments of the real were to be "bracketed" or suspended, and then analyzed to bring to light the role of consciousness in constituting or constructing them. With the concept of the lifeworld, however, Husserl embarked on a different path, which recognizes that, even at its deepest level, consciousness is already embedded in and operating in a world of meanings and pre-judgements that are socially, culturally, and historically constituted. Phenomenology thereby became the study not just of the pure consciousness and meanings of a transcendental ego, as in Husserl's earlier work, but of consciousness and meaning in context. The lifeworld is one of the more complicated concepts in phenomenology, mainly because of its status as both personal and intersubjective.

Even if a person's historicity is intimately tied up with his lifeworld, and each person thus has a lifeworld, this doesn't necessarily mean that the lifeworld is a purely individual phenomenon. In keeping with the phenomenological notion of intersubjectivity, the lifeworld can be intersubjective even though each individual necessarily carries his own "personal" lifeworld ("homeworld"); meaning is intersubjectively accessible, and can be communicated (shared by one's "homecomrades"). However, a homeworld is also always limited by an alienworld. The internal "meanings" of this alienworld can be communicated, but can never be apprehended as alien; the alien can only be appropriated or assimilated into the lifeworld, and only understood on the background of the lifeworld.

== Sociology ==
The Husserlian elucidation of lifeworld provided a starting point for the phenomenological sociology of Alfred Schütz, who tried to synthesize Husserl's phenomenology of consciousness, meaning, and the life-world with Max Weber's sociology and its focus on subjectively meaningful action. Jürgen Habermas has further developed the concept of the lifeworld in his social theory. For Habermas, the lifeworld is more or less the "background" environment of competences, practices, and attitudes representable in terms of one's cognitive horizon. Compared to Husserl with his focus on consciousness, however, Habermas, whose social theory is grounded in communication, focuses on the lifeworld as consisting of socially and culturally sedimented linguistic meanings. It is the lived realm of informal, culturally-grounded understandings and mutual accommodations. Rationalization and colonization of the lifeworld by the instrumental rationality of bureaucracies and market-forces is a primary concern of Habermas's two-volume Theory of Communicative Action.

For Habermas, communicative action is governed by practical rationality—ideas of social importance are mediated through the process of linguistic communication according to the rules of practical rationality. By contrast, technical rationality governs systems of instrumentality, like industries, or on a larger scale, the capitalist economy or the democratic political government. Ideas of instrumental importance to a system are mediated according to the rules of that system (the most obvious example is the capitalist economy's use of currency). Self-deception, and thus systematically distorted communication, is possible only when the lifeworld has been 'colonized' by instrumental rationality, so some social norm comes into existence and enjoys legitimate power even though it is not justifiable. This occurs when means of mediating instrumental ideas gains communicative power—as when someone pays a group of people to stay quiet during a public debate, or if financial or administrative resources are used to advertise some social viewpoint. When people take the resulting consensus as normatively relevant, the lifeworld has been colonized and communication has been systematically distorted. The 'colonization' metaphor is used because the use of steering media to arrive at social consensus is not native to the lifeworld—the decision-making processes of the systems world must encroach on the lifeworld in a way that is in a sense imperialistic:

When stripped of their ideological veils, the imperatives of autonomous subsystems make their way into the lifeworld from the outside—like colonial masters coming into a tribal society—and force a process of assimilation upon it. The diffused perspectives of the local culture cannot be sufficiently coordinated to permit the play of the metropolis and the world market to be grasped from the periphery.

The fragmentation of consciousness associated with the two Marxist concepts of alienation and false consciousness illustrates why, in Habermas's perspective, they are merely special cases of the more general phenomenon of lifeworld colonization.

Social coordination and systemic regulation occur by means of shared practices, beliefs, values, and structures of communicative interaction, which may be institutionally based. We are inevitably lifeworldly, such that individuals and interactions draw from custom and cultural traditions to construct identities, define situations, coordinate action, and create social solidarity. Ideally this occurs by communicatively coming to understanding (German Verstehen), but it also occurs through pragmatic negotiations (compare: Seidman, 1997:197).

The lifeworld is related to further concepts such as Pierre Bourdieu's notion of habitus and to the sociological notion of everyday life.

== Epistemology ==
In the course of recent constructivist discourses a discussion about the term lifeworld took place as well. Björn Kraus' relational-constructivist version of the term lifeworld considers its phenomenological roots (Husserl and Schütz), but expands it within the range of epistemological constructivist theory building. In consequence, a new approach is created, which is not only focusing on the individual perspective upon the lifeworld term, but is also taking account of social and material environmental conditions and their relevance as emphasized for example by Habermas. Essential therefore is Kraus' basic assumption that cognitive development depends on two determining factors. On the one hand a person's own reality is her subjective construct. On the other hand this construct—in spite of all subjectivity—is not random: Since a person is still linked to her environment, her own reality is influenced by the conditions of this environment (German Grundsätzliche Doppelbindung menschlicher Strukturentwicklung).

Building up on this point of view, a separation of individual perception and the social and material environmental conditions is made possible. Kraus accordingly picks up the lifeworld term, adds the term life conditions (German Lebenslage) and opposes the two terms to each other.

By this means, lifeworld describes a person's subjectively experienced world, whereas life conditions describe the person's actual circumstances in life. Accordingly, it could be said that a person's lifeworld is built depending on their particular life conditions. More precisely, the life conditions include the material and immaterial living circumstances as for example employment situation, availability of material resources, housing conditions, social environment (friends, foes, acquaintances, relatives, etc.) as well as the persons physical condition (fat/thin, tall/small, female/male, healthy/sick, etc.). The lifeworld, in contrast, describes the subjective perception of these conditions.

Kraus uses the epistemological distinction between subjective reality and objective reality. Thus, a person's lifeworld correlates with the person's life conditions in the same way than subjective reality correlates with objective reality. The one is the insurmountable, subjective construct built depending on the other one's conditions.

Kraus defined lifeworld and life conditions as follows:

"Life conditions mean a person's material and immaterial circumstances of life.

Lifeworld means a person's subjective construction of reality, which he or she forms under the condition of his or her life circumstances."

This contrasting comparison provides a conceptual specification, enabling in the first step the distinction between a subjectively experienced world and its material and social conditions and allowing in the second step to focus on these conditions' relevance for the subjective construction of reality.

With this in mind, Manfred Ferdinand, who is reviewing the lifeworld terms used by Alfred Schütz, Edmund Husserl, Björn Kraus and Ludwig Wittgenstein, concludes: Kraus' "thoughts on a constructivist comprehension of lifeworlds contours the integration of micro-, meso- and macroscopic approaches, as it is demanded by Invernizzi and Butterwege: This integration is not only necessary in order to relate the subjective perspectives and the objective frame conditions to each other but also because the objective frame conditions obtain their relevance for the subjective lifeworlds not before they are perceived and assessed."

== See also ==
- Umwelt
- Phaneron
