= Björn Kraus =

German philosopher, epistemologist, and systemic therapist

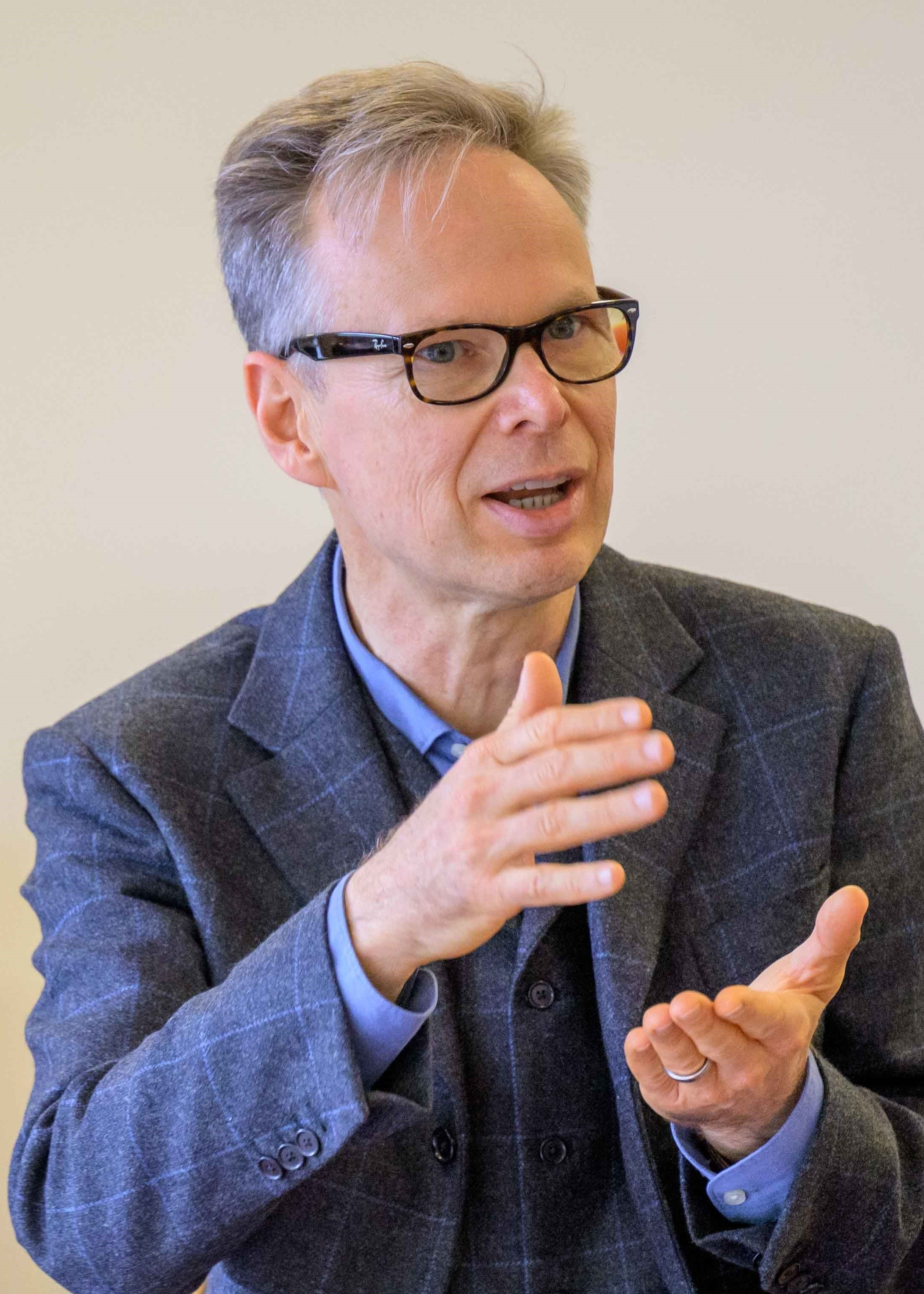

Björn Kraus (born 1969) is a German philosopher (epistemologist and social scientist). Since the end of the 1990s he has been one of the key protagonists of constructivist theory formation. His work on epistemological and social science led to the development of relational constructivism. He therefore picks up on the doubt about the possibilities of human perception. He thus stands in tradition of a skepticism as for example defined by Immanuel Kant and Ernst von Glasersfeld. Based on the subjectivity of human reality constructions, Björn Kraus focuses on the relational conditions of human being in general and cognitive processes in particular.

== Biography ==
Kraus studied social work in Ludwigshafen, educational science in Landau (diploma in social pedagogy) and education management (M.A.) in Freiburg. He received a doctor's degree in philosophy (Dr. Phil.) at Heidelberg University, Germany. In the environment of the "Heidelberger Schule," he obtained further education as systemic therapist, coach and clinical supervisor. The "constructivist turn", which had taken place in the early 1980s in this field, gets obvious in his fundamental theory work. Since 2005, he is a professor of social work sciences at the Protestant University of Applied Sciences in Freiburg, Germany. Note that in Germany the title "protestant", although referring to the Protestant Church's sponsorship, does not influence the tuition or scientific content taught at this institution. In this context, clerically managed universities do not differ from state-run universities. His research priorities are epistemology, communication and power, professional decision-making and responsibility as well as systemic anthropology and methodology.

== Work ==
Kraus has set up the foundation of an epistemology-based theory of interaction and the social constitution of subjective reality in several monographs, anthologies and essays. Coming from his perspective of an epistemological constructivism the relational constructivism, he first developed a theory of communication and power and, based on that, discussed questions about professional decision-making.

He focuses on the socio-scientific important questions about the possibilities of perception, knowledge and decision-making. Also on the condition of communication, power, help and kontroll. He analyses them regarding limits and possibilities, which remain in spite of the assumed self-referentiality or result from it at the first place.

The keystones of his (epistemology-based) theory of interaction and the relational constitution of subjective reality are communication, lifeworld and power.

=== Epistemological constructivism / Relational constructivism ===
Björn Kraus developed an epistemological constructivism named relational constructivism. His ideas are based on the notion that cognitive development depends on two determining factors. On the one hand side cognitive development is dependent on a person's own, individual cognitive structures. On the other hand, side it relies on the person's environmental conditions (German: Grundsätzliche Doppelbindung menschlicher Strukturentwicklung). Accordingly, his main focus is placed on the relationship between the social and material environment of a person (objective reality or life conditions/German Lebenslage) and, in contrast, its individual perception (subjective experience or lifeworld/German Lebenswelt). This perspective becomes obvious, when Kraus reformulates Husserl's lifeworld concept in a systemic, constructivist way: In opposing the terms lifeworld (subjective reality) and life conditions (objective reality) to each other, he is able to review their interrelation. For Kraus, the lifeworld is a person's subjective construct, which is neither random, nor manipulable from the outside. Apart from the field of social work, the terms lifeworld and life condition, which were constructivistically reformulated by Kraus, are used in the field of educational science (education, special education and community pedagogy) as well as in the field of sociology.

Kraus defined "lifeworld" and "life conditions" as follows:

"Life conditions mean a person's material and immaterial circumstances of life.

Lifeworld means a person's subjective construction of reality, which he or she forms under the condition of his or her life circumstances."

This contrasting comparison provides a conceptual specification, enabling in the first step the distinction between a subjectively experienced world and its material and social conditions and allowing in the second step to focus on these conditions' relevance for the subjective construction of reality.

With this in mind, Manfred Ferdinand, who is reviewing the lifeworld terms used by Alfred Schütz, Edmund Husserl, Björn Kraus and Ludwig Wittgenstein, concludes: Kraus' "thoughts on a constructivist comprehension of lifeworlds contours the integration of micro-, meso- and macroscopic approaches, as it is demanded by Invernizzi and Butterwege: This integration is not only necessary in order to relate the subjective perspectives and the objective frame conditions to each other but also because the objective frame conditions obtain their relevance for the subjective lifeworlds not before they are perceived and assessed."

=== Constructivist theory of power ===
Regarding the question about possibilities of interpersonal influence, Kraus develops a special form of constructivism, which deals with the epistemological perspective upon power (German: Machtanalytischer Konstruktivismus). Instead of focusing on the valuation and distribution of power, he asks first and foremost what the term can describe at all. Coming from Max Weber's definition of power, he realizes that the term of power has to be split into instructive power and destructive power.

More precisely, instructive power means the chance to determine the actions and thoughts of another person, whereas destructive power means the chance to diminish the opportunities of another person. How significant this distinction really is, becomes evident by looking at the possibilities of rejecting power attempts: Rejecting instructive power is possible – rejecting destructive power isn't. By using this distinction, proportions of power can be analyzed in a more sophisticated way, helping to sufficiently reflect on matters of responsibility.

Kraus defined "instructive power" and "destructive power" as follows:

"Instructive power means the chance to determine a human's thinking or behaviour.

(Instructive power as chance for instructive interaction is dependent on the instructed person's own will, which ultimately can refuse instructive power.)

Destructive power means the chance to restrict a human's possibilities.

(Destructive power as chance for destructive interaction is independent of the instructed person's own will, which can't refuse destructive power.)"

This perspective permits to get over an "either-or-position" (either there is power, or there isn't), which is common especially in epistemological discourses about power theories, and to introduce the possibility of an "as well as-position".

== English-language texts ==
- Kraus, Björn (2019): Relational constructivism and relational social work. In: Webb, Stephen, A. (edt.) The Routledge Handbook of Critical Social Work. Routledge international Handbooks. London and New York: Taylor & Francis Ltd.
- Kraus, Björn (2015): The Life We Live and the Life We Experience: Introducing the Epistemological Difference between "Lifeworld" (Lebenswelt) and "Life Conditions" (Lebenslage). In: Social Work and Society. International Online Journal. Retrieved 27 August 2018 (http://www.socwork.net/sws/article/view/438)
- Kraus, Björn (2014): Introducing a model for analyzing the possibilities of power, help and control. In: Social Work and Society. International Online Journal. Retrieved 3 April 2019 (http://www.socwork.net/sws/article/view/393)
