= Relational constructivism =

Relational constructivism can be perceived as a relational consequence of radical constructivism. In contrast to social constructivism, it picks up the epistemological threads and maintains the radical constructivist idea that humans cannot overcome their limited conditions of reception (i.e. self-referentially operating cognition). Therefore, humans are not able to come to objective conclusions about the world.

In spite of the subjectivity of human constructions of reality, relational constructivism focusses on the relational conditions applying to human perceptional processes. According to Björn Kraus:

It is substantial for relational constructivism that it basically originates from an epistemological point of view, thus from the subject and its construction processes. Coming from this perspective it then focusses on the (not only social, but also material) relations under which these cognitive construction processes are performed. Consequently, it's not only about social construction processes, but about cognitive construction processes performed under certain relational conditions.

== Lifeworld and life conditions as relational constructions ==
In the course of recent constructivist discourses, a discussion about the term lifeworld took place. Björn Kraus' relational-constructivist version of the lifeworld term considers its phenomenological roots (Husserl and Schütz), but expands it within the range of epistemological constructivist theory building.

In consequence, a new approach is created, which focusses on the individual perspective upon the lifeworld term and takes account of social and material environmental conditions and their relevance, as emphasized, for example, by Jürgen Habermas. Essential therefore is Kraus' basic assumption that cognitive development depends on two determining factors. A person's own reality is their subjective construct, but this construct—in spite of all subjectivity—is not random: because a person is still linked to their environment, their own reality is influenced by the conditions of this environment (German: Grundsätzliche Doppelbindung menschlicher Strukturentwicklung).

Building up on this point of view, a separation of individual perception and the social and material environmental conditions is made possible. Kraus accordingly picks up the term lifeworld, adds the term "life conditions" (German: Lebenslage; originally introduced by philosophers Otto Neurath in 1931 as well as Gerhard Weisser in 1956) and opposes the two terms to each other.

By this means, lifeworld describes a person's subjectively experienced world, whereas life conditions describe the person's actual circumstances in life. Accordingly, it could be said a person's lifeworld is built depending on their particular life conditions. More precisely, the life conditions include the material and immaterial living circumstances as for example employment situation, availability of material resources, housing conditions, social environment as well as the person's physical condition. The lifeworld, in contrast, describes the subjective perception of these conditions.

Kraus uses the epistemological distinction between subjective reality and objective reality. Thus, a person's lifeworld correlates with the person's life conditions in the same way that subjective reality correlates with objective reality. One is the insurmountable, subjective construct built depending on the other one's conditions.

Kraus defined lifeworld and life conditions as follows:

Life conditions mean a person's material and immaterial circumstances of life. Lifeworld means a person's subjective construction of reality, which he or she forms under the condition of his or her life circumstances.

This contrasting comparison provides a conceptual specification, enabling in the first step the distinction between a subjectively experienced world and its material and social conditions and allowing in the second step to focus on these conditions' relevance for the subjective construction of reality. With this in mind, Manfred Ferdinand, who is reviewing the lifeworld terms used by Alfred Schütz, Edmund Husserl, Björn Kraus and Ludwig Wittgenstein, concludes: "Kraus' thoughts on a constructivist comprehension of lifeworlds contours the integration of micro-, meso- and macroscopic approaches, as it is demanded by Invernizzi and Butterwege: This integration is not only necessary in order to relate the subjective perspectives and the objective frame conditions to each other but also because the objective frame conditions obtain their relevance for the subjective lifeworlds not before they are perceived and assessed."

== Theory of power ==
Björn Kraus deals with the epistemological perspective upon power regarding the question about possibilities of interpersonal influence by developing a special form of constructivism ("Machtanalytischer Konstruktivismus").

Instead of focussing on the valuation and distribution of power, he asks what the term can describe at all. Coming from Max Weber's definition of power, he realizes the term of power has to be split into "instructive power" and "destructive power". More precisely, instructive power means the chance to determine the actions and thoughts of another person, whereas destructive power means the chance to diminish the opportunities of another person.

Kraus defined "instructive power" and "destructive power" as follows:

"Instructive power" means the chance to determine a human's thinking or behaviour. (Instructive power as chance for instructive interaction is dependent on the instructed person's own will, which ultimately can refuse instructive power.) "Destructive power" means the chance to restrict a human's possibilities. (Destructive power as chance for destructive interaction is independent of the instructed person's own will, which can't refuse destructive power.)

It is possible to reject instructive power, but it is not possible to reject destructive power. This perspective permits one to get over an "either-or-position" (either there is power, or there isn't), which is common especially in epistemological discourses about power theories, and to introduce the possibility of an "as well as-position".

According to Wolf Ritscher, it is Björn Kraus who "has reflected on the topic of power as a substantial aspect of social existence in a constructivist manner and has shown that constructivism can also be used in terms of social theory".

== Systems ==
It is central to relational constructivism that social conditions cannot be recognized as allegedly objective, but are described from an observer position in social relationships on the basis of determined criteria. In this sense, for example, power is not seen as objectively recognizable, but as a relational phenomenon. Its description depends on the observers point of view.

As with Weber, the definition of instructive power and destructive power focuses on the "opportunity within a social relation to put through one's own will, also against reluctance". Here, the category of power is not conceived as a per se existing but rather as a social phenomenon. In this respect, the terms instructive power and destructive power do not describe any observer-independent, existing units that a person has or attributes that are inherent in a person, but rather assertion potential in social relations.

The same applies to the relational-constructivist understanding of lifeworlds and living conditions: Although a person's living conditions seem to be much more accessible than a person's lifeworld by observation, both categories are always subject to the ever differing perspective of an observer. Nevertheless, it remains easier to describe life conditions than lifeworlds. While living conditions actually can be observed, statements about lifeworlds always refer to speculated cognitive constructs that cannot be accessed by observation.

For Kraus, it is important that systems cannot be defined as independent from an observer. This is the reason he names criteria allowing distinction between a system and its surrounding environment:

A system is a set of elements, which are determined as cohesive from an observer's perspective. Their relations to each other differ quantitatively and/or qualitatively from those to other entities. These observed differences allow to constitute a system border, distinguishing the system from its environment.

He concludes that it depends on these criteria and the observations made by the observing persons, whether systems can be identified or not.

== Criticism and counter-criticism ==
Constructivist positions are accused with being "blind to the difference between truth and lies." It is problematized that truths only seem to exist in the plural and that the associated task of distinguishing between lies and truth is "dangerous on the one hand and inappropriate on the other".

Kraus takes a detailed look at this problem at various points and, using recourse to philosophical discourses of truth, clarifies that a distinction must first be made between "truth" and "truthfulness" and that the opposite of "truth" is not the "lie" but the "Falsehood". The counterpart of "truthfulness", on the other hand, is the category of "lies".

So there are the following comparisons: truth - falsehood and truthfulness - lie. Based on this, Kraus defines lie as a contradiction to the subjective belief that it is true.

A person's statement is considered a lie if it contradicts their own thinking of it as true.

Then he differentiates between lies (as deliberate false statements) and errors (as subjective thinking of something as true that is judged as not true or false). He also clarifies that it can only be decided from observer positions whether a statement is true or false, but that these decisions cannot be made arbitrarily, but must be reasonably justified.

In this respect, there can be no objective truth from the perspective of a constructivist epistemology, but it is still possible to justify when a statement should be considered true in terms of consensus and/or coherence.

Kraus claims that with this approach, it is also constructivistically possible to make a well-founded decision about the difference between news and fake news.

== Literature ==
- Kraus, Björn (2014): Introducing a model for analyzing the possibilities of power, help and control. In: Social Work and Society. International Online Journal. Retrieved 3 April 2019. (http://www.socwork.net/sws/article/view/393)
- Kraus, Björn (2015): The Life We Live and the Life We Experience: Introducing the Epistemological Difference between "Lifeworld" (Lebenswelt) and "Life Conditions" (Lebenslage). In: Social Work and Society. International Online Journal. Retrieved 27 August 2018.(http://www.socwork.net/sws/article/view/438)
- Kraus, Björn (2017): Plädoyer für den Relationalen Konstruktivismus und eine Relationale Soziale Arbeit. (Forum Sozial, 1/2017). (https://www.pedocs.de/frontdoor.php?source_opus=15381)
- Kraus, Björn (2019): Relational constructivism and relational social work. In: Webb, Stephen, A. (edt.) The Routledge Handbook of Critical Social Work. Routledge international Handbooks. London and New York: Taylor & Francis Ltd.
- Kraus, Björn (2019): Relationaler Konstruktivismus – Relationale Soziale Arbeit. Von der systemisch-konstruktivistischen Lebensweltorientierung zu einer relationalen Theorie der Sozialen Arbeit. Weinheim, München: Beltz, Juventa.
