= Mitterer =

Mitterer is a German surname. Notable people with the surname include:

- Erika Mitterer (1906–2001), Austrian writer
- Holger Mitterer (born 1973), German cognitive scientist and linguist
- Josef Mitterer (born 1948), Austrian philosopher
- Peter Mitterer (1946–2013), Austrian politician
- Peter Mitterer (archer) (born 1947), Austrian archer
- Wolfgang Mitterer (born 1958), Austrian composer and musician
