= Horst Dreier =

German jurist and legal philosopher

- Born: 7 September 1954 (age 71); Hannover, Lower Saxony
- Education: University of Würzburg; University of Hannover
- Scientific career
- Fields: Legal studies, legal philosophy
- Workplaces: University of Würzburg
- Doctoral advisor: Hasso Hofmann

Horst Dreier (born 7 September 1954) is a German jurist and legal philosopher. He currently holds a chair at the University of Würzburg. In 2008 he was the initial candidate to replace Winfried Hassemer at the Federal Constitutional Court of Germany, but his nomination was opposed by the CDU for his controversial positions regarding torture and stem cell research, and eventually withdrawn in favor of Andreas Voßkuhle.

A native of Hannover, Lower Saxony, Dreier attended the University of Hannover, where he received his Staatsexamen in 1981. He went on to earn his Doctor of Laws from the University of Würzburg in 1985, under supervision of Hasso Hofmann.

Horst Dreier received several awards for his work; in 2000, the "Award for Excellence in Teaching" from the Bavarian State Minister for Science, Research and the Arts and in 2002 he was awarded the Austrian Decoration for Science and Art by the Federal President of the Republic of Austria.

In 2003 Dreier was elected as a member of the Philosophy and History Class of the Bavarian Academy of Sciences and in 2007 he was inducted into the German Academy of Sciences Leopoldina. He is the doctoral supervisor of Frauke Brosius-Gersdorf.

== Selected publications ==
English language publications only

- ——— (1999), "The Essence of Democracy – Hans Kelsen and Carl Schmitt Juxtaposed", in Diner, Dan; Stolleis, Michael (eds.), Hans Kelsen and Carl Schmitt. A Juxtaposition, Gerlingen: Bleicher, pp. 71–79, ISBN 3-88350-466-1.
- ——— (2004), "Does Cloning Violate the Basic Law's Guarantee of Human Dignity?", in Vöneky, Silja; Wolfrum, Rüdiger (eds.), Human Dignity and Human Cloning, Leiden: Brill, pp. 77–85, ISBN 90-04-14233-9.
