= Josef Mitterer =

Austrian philosopher (born 1948)

Josef Mitterer in Innsbruck, 2016

Josef Mitterer (born 1948) is an Austrian philosopher, and a retired professor at the University of Klagenfurt Department of Philosophy.

Mitterer studied psychology and sociology in Innsbruck and Linz and philosophy in Graz. His studies also took him to the London School of Economics (Imre Lakatos), to Heidelberg University (Richard Rorty), IUC Dubrovnik (Michael Dummett, Willard Van Orman Quine) and in 1976 to Berkeley where he studied with Paul Feyerabend. Mitterer received his doctorate at the University of Graz in 1978. He then worked as a Tour Director in Europe and Asia and as a Management Consultant for the Travel Industry in the USA. Since 1990 Mitterer has been teaching philosophy at the University of Klagenfurt; he held guest lectureships at the universities of Innsbruck, Linz, Ljubljana, and Siegen.

In his book Das Jenseits der Philosophie (The Beyond of Philosophy), based on his dissertation, he developed a Non-dualizing Philosophy of Change, which foregoes the categorical distinction between language and language-distinct reality. In Die Flucht aus der Beliebigkeit (The Flight from Contingency) (2001) he critically examines the epistemological goal of truth. His critically acclaimed books have been translated into Polish and the A&HCI-Journal Constructivist Foundations has published two special issues on Mitterer's philosophy, The Non-dualizing Philosophy of Josef Mitterer (2008) and Non-dualism: A Conceptual Revision? (2013).

Josef Mitterer is a member of the scientific advisory board of the European Forum Alpbach, of the board of the Austrian Ludwig Wittgenstein Society, of the advisory board of the Karl Popper Foundation and is one of the literary executors of Ernst von Glasersfeld. He was co-organizer of the 38th International Wittgenstein Symposium "Realism – Relativism – Constructivism". In 2018 Mitterer delivered the Heinz von Foerster Lecture at the University of Vienna.

== Non-dualizing Philosophy of Change ==
The Non-dualizing Philosophy of Change develops an alternative to three common features of reasoning which, according to Josef Mitterer, can be found in all major philosophical traditions. These three fundamental agreements are:

- a dichotomic distinction between language and language-distinct reality, between descriptions and description-distinct objects, between talking about the world and the world itself, etc. – regardless of whether language depicts or constructs reality, whether the relationship between sign and referent is arbitrary or not.
- the truth-orientation of philosophy. The search for truth and knowledge is a search for agreement between the two sides of this dichotomy: an agreement between language and reality, between description and object, between metalanguage and object language – regardless whether this agreement is called "true" or "adequate" with reference to an independent reality or if it is considered as viable in a constructed reality.
- The direction of thinking is directed towards the objects of thought, whatever may serve as such an object: the world, reality, an element of an object-language. Our cognitive efforts are directed towards the objects of cognition.

According to Mitterer these three commonalities are not only prevalent in realistic philosophies; they can also be found at least as residuals or minimal ontologies in post-structuralist, relativist or (radical) constructivist theories of knowledge. He sums up the various philosophical traditions in a simple statement:

Either: There are distinctions and therefore we make them (realism) or: We make distinctions and therefore they are (idealism, constructivism).

In Das Jenseits der Philosophie (The Beyond of Philosophy) Josef Mitterer developed an alternative way of thinking which foregoes the dichotomy between language and reality. A description of an object does not refer to the object, but rather starts from the object. The object of a description relates to the description of the object like a description so far to a description from now on. A new description of the object changes the object into a new object of further description(s). Mitterer does not want to deny or overcome the distinctions between language and reality, word and object, between what we talk and what we talk about. He is rather interested in when, how and why these distinctions are introduced into our discourse.

An English translation of Mitterer's books, The Beyond of Philosophy and The Flight from Contingency, is being published on Richard Marshall's philosophy website 3:16 am.

== Bibliography ==
=== Primary ===
- Das Jenseits der Philosophie. Wider das dualistische Erkenntnisprinzip. Passagen-Verlag, Wien 1992. ISBN 3-85165-016-6.
- Die Flucht aus der Beliebigkeit. Fischer Taschenbuch Verlag Nr. 14929, Frankfurt/M. 2001. ISBN 3-596-14929-0.

=== Secondary ===
- Riegler, Alexander & Weber, Stefan (Eds.) (2008): The Non-dualizing Philosophy of Josef Mitterer. Special Issue of Constructivist Foundations, 3 (3).
- Riegler, Alexander & Weber, Stefan (Eds.) (2010): Die Dritte Philosophie. Kritische Beiträge zu Josef Mitterers Non-Dualismus. Weilerswist: Velbrück Wissenschaft.
- Riegler, Alexander & Weber, Stefan (Eds.) (2013): Non-dualism: A Conceptual Revision? Special Issue of Constructivist Foundations, 8 (2).
- Kletzl, Sebastian (2015): Edifying non-dualism: Richard Rorty meets Josef Mitterer. In: Kanzian C., Mitterer J. & Neges K. (Eds.), Realism – relativism – constructivism: Contributions of the 38th International Wittgenstein Symposium. Austrian Ludwig Wittgenstein Society, Kirchberg am Wechsel: 160–162.
- Weber, Stefan (2018): What is new in non-dualism? Advancement and criticism between 2013 and 2018. Constructivist Foundations, 13 (3).
- Weber, Stefan (2020): Why Josef Mitterer's non-dualism is inconsistent. Constructivist Foundations, 15 (2).

== Honours and awards ==
- 2017: Honorary Citizen, University of Innsbruck
- 2022: Austrian Cross of Honour for Science and Art, First Class
