= Stefan Weber =

Stefan Weber may refer to:

- Stefan Weber (media researcher) (born 1970), Austrian scientist
- Stefan Weber (musician) (1946–2018), Austrian musician and composer
- Stefan Weber (Orientalist) (born 1967), German Islamicist

== See also ==
- Steven Weber (born 1961), American actor
