= Frauke Brosius-Gersdorf =

German legal scientist and university professor of Public law

Frauke Brosius-Gersdorf in 2026

Frauke Brosius-Gersdorf (born 15 June 1971, in Hamburg, née Frauke Brosius) is a German jurist and university professor of Public law at the University of Potsdam.

== Biography ==
Brosius-Gersdorf studied legal science at the University of Hamburg, and in 1995, she completed her studies by taking the First State Examination in Law. Afterwards, she worked at the University of Hamburg as a research assistant for Jürgen Schwabe. Supervised by Horst Dreier, Brosius-Gersdorf obtained a Doctor in Law in 1997. After a research stay at the University of Edinburgh, she earned a Master of Laws from there in 1998. Upon returning to Germany, she completed her legal clerkship (Referendariat) in Hamburg, where she passed the Second State Examination in 2000. Then, Brosius-Gersdorf worked as a lawyer in Bonn and Berlin until 2004, before returning to academia and working for Hartmut Bauer at TU Dresden. In 2005, she followed Bauer as his research assistant at the University of Potsdam, where she completed her Habilitation in 2010, specializing in public law, administrative law, and social law.

=== Planned election as constitutional judge 2025 ===
In 2025, Brosius-Gersdorf and Ann-Katrin Kaufhold were nominated by the SPD as candidates to succeed Doris König and Ulrich Maidowski, judges of the Federal Constitutional Court. In the Bundestag's Judicial Election Committee, Brosius-Gersdorf received approval, including from the CDU/CSU.

Brosius-Gersdorf was scheduled to be elected as a Federal Constitutional Court judge on 11 July 2025, along with Kaufhold and Günter Spinner. Activist blogger Thomas Laschyk of the platform "Volksverpetzer" claimed two weeks later that Brosius-Gersdorf had shown no controversial views prior to the nomination, and that her positions were not much different than those of other judges on the court. He pointed out that even the CDU/CSU, with Chancellor Friedrich Merz and leader of CDU/CSU parliamentary group Jens Spahn, had spoken out in her favor.

Due to various objections from members of the CDU/CSU regarding her as a candidate, the judge election in the German Bundestag, originally scheduled for 11 July 2025, was postponed.

After the election had been postponed, Jens Spahn attempted to downplay the public criticism of the dissenters' behavior. He defended those who had mobilized against Brosius-Gersdorf with "life protection" arguments. However, Volksverpetzer-activists did not focus on the CDU MPs' conscientious decisions, but focused on a disinformation campaign, that apparently fell on fertile ground and took hold of the parliamentary group. SPD MP Matthias Miersch saw an online "smear campaign" against Brosius-Gersdorf. A program broadcast by public-service television broadcaster ZDF, that attempted to show Brosius-Gersdorf election was prevented by a right-wing campaign only, included several false claims that had to be retracted later.

On 7 August 2025 Brosius-Gersdorf withdrew her candidature for the constitutional court, citing talks with CDU/CSU parliamentarians who allegedly told her that elements within their parties would not support her election.

== Positions ==
She also holds these positions on the three issues addressed by the criticism campaign:

- In the debate about mandatory vaccination in Germany, she would have considered it constitutional.
- Brosius-Gersdorf believes a ban on the right-wing AfD party would be sensible "if there is sufficient evidence". This position is in agreement with the Basic Law, which explicitly allows for well-founded party bans.
- Brosius-Gersdorf was a member of an expert commission examining the issue of abortion in Germany at the Scholz government. She recommended that abortion should not be criminalized, and should be regulated outside of criminal law. As of July 2025, abortion remains listed in Germany's criminal code, but is not punishable during the first twelve weeks following fertilisation if certain additional conditions are met, or if the pregnant woman's life or health are at severe risk.

Various representatives of the Catholic Church sharply criticized that she should become federal judge because of the Catholic Church's stance on abortion. Brosius-Gersdorf was labeled as left activist by conservative commentators, regarding her compulsory women's quota, as well as her support for public servants to wear a headscarf while on duty if they want to. Journalists and observers saw the criticized positions to have been deliberately misinterpretated or taken out of context.

== Criticism of Brosius-Gersdorf before her planned election ==
Later in her election campaign, she was confronted by accusations of plagiarism, which she denied by publishing an expertise to exonerate her academic work. Plagiarism hunter Stefan Weber on the other hand kept pointing out various irregularities, including Brosius-Gersdorf and her husband Hubertus Gersdorf using identical phrasing in their works and occasionally even making the same quotation mistakes. With lawyers making public statements and neither the universities of Hamburg or Potsdam, nor the SPD commenting on Webers allegations, journalist Harald Neuber by mid August 2025 saw the credibility of the German academic system at stake. Only in late July 2026 the university of Hamburg published a short statement, informing that the deparments tasked with investigating the accusations of scientific misconduct found them unjustified.

The right wing media coverage reflected several AfD positions, and, according to observers, was intended to frame Brosius-Gersdorf as "very left-leaning". In that case, she would be unelectable for conservative CDU and CSU MP representatives.

Following the plagiarism allegations, CDU MP Saskia Ludwig demanded that Brosius-Gersdorf temporarily suspend her teaching position at the University of Potsdam. The plagiarism allegations were made shortly before the planned election, and were refuted by her.

Beatrix von Storch (AfD) had stated during a debate in the Bundestag on 9 July 2025 that Brosius-Gersdorf did not grant a 9 month old fetus, 2 minutes before birth, human dignity and confronted Chancellor Merz by asking him, if he can reconcile to vote for such a person with his conscience. Journalist Patrick Bahners commented that Chancellor Merz accepted this insinuation by von Storch without objection, and that even the SPD failed to defend Brosius-Gersdorf.

As one of Germany's most renowned legal scholars, Ekkehart Reimer edited the article about Frauke Brosius-Gersdorf on the German Wikipedia before her election. He had added her position on abortion, but incorrectly. He initially wrote that the judge wanted to allow abortion in the "first 12 months of pregnancy." He later changed this to "the first twelve weeks of pregnancy."

== Reactions ==
In an open letter, nearly 300 legal scholars criticized the discussion as "unobjective", and the proceedings as "poorly prepared". The signatories emphasized that Brosius-Gersdorf is a highly respected constitutional law professor, and completely uncontroversial in professional circles. According to the signatories, the withdrawal of Frauke Brosius-Gersdorf's nomination was due to "ideological lobby groups and campaigns riddled with untruths and defamation", which the members of parliament were influenced by. This demonstrates "at the very least a lack of political backbone and inadequate internal preparation", they wrote. "The fact that extremely implausible allegations of plagiarism must then serve as a pretext for a postponement, thereby accepting further damage to the candidate, is an attack on the reputation of academia and its representatives."

Frauke Brosius-Gersdorf appeared in an interview on television with Markus Lanz on 15 July 2025, talking about misleading reports on her legal positions prior to the election. She sees herself as somebody who stands for moderate views from the center of society, and dismissed labels like "ultra left" and "radical left" in a written statement as "defamatory" and "detached from reality".
