= Radical constructivism =

Position of epistemology

Radical constructivism is an approach to epistemology that situates knowledge in terms of knowers' experience. It looks to break with the conception of knowledge as a correspondence between a knower's understanding of their experience and the world beyond that experience. Adopting a skeptical position towards correspondence as in principle impossible to verify because one cannot access the world beyond one's experience in order to test the relation, radical constructivists look to redefine epistemology in terms of the viability of knowledge within knowers' experience. This break from the traditional framing of epistemology differentiates it from "trivial" forms of constructivism that emphasise the role of the knower in constructing knowledge while maintaining the traditional perspective of knowledge in terms of correspondence. Radical constructivism has been described as a "post-epistemological" position.

Radical constructivism was initially formulated by Ernst von Glasersfeld, who drew on the work of Jean Piaget, Giambattista Vico, and George Berkeley amongst others. Radical constructivism is closely related to second-order cybernetics, and especially the work of Heinz von Foerster, Humberto Maturana, and Francisco Varela. During the 1980s, Siegfried J. Schmidt played a leading role in establishing radical constructivism as a paradigm within the German speaking academic world.

Radical constructivism has been influential in educational research and the philosophy of science.

Constructivist Foundations is a free online journal publishing peer-reviewed articles on radical constructivism by researchers from multiple domains.
