= Power (political science) =

Ability to influence the behaviour of others

In political science, power is the ability to direct the actions and conduct of others. Political power is usually exercised through government offices with authority, over political societies which are often termed states. Power does not exclusively refer to the threat or use of force (coercion) by one actor against another, but may also be exerted through diffuse means (such as institutions).

The term authority is often used for power that is perceived as legitimate or socially approved by the social structure. Scholars have distinguished between soft power and hard power.

== Definition ==
The concept of power in politics has been debated, with many thinkers offering differing definitions. Political scientist Robert Dahl views power as a form of "relations among people", wherein one party has an ability to command over another party. Hannah Arendt defined power as being an instrument of political rule, and disassociated power with the ability of an actor to use violence. Max Weber defined power as "any chance (regardless of the basis of this chance) to carry through one’s own will", even against outright opposition.

== Types ==
=== Soft power ===
soft power is the ability to influence or persuade others through the use of persuasive means, as opposed to the use of force or coercion, which is an aspect of hard power.

=== Hard power ===
hard power is the use of military and economic means to influence the behavior or interests of other political bodies. This form of political power is often aggressive (coercion), and is most immediately effective when imposed by one political body upon another of less military and/or economic power.

=== Authoritarian/Absolute ===
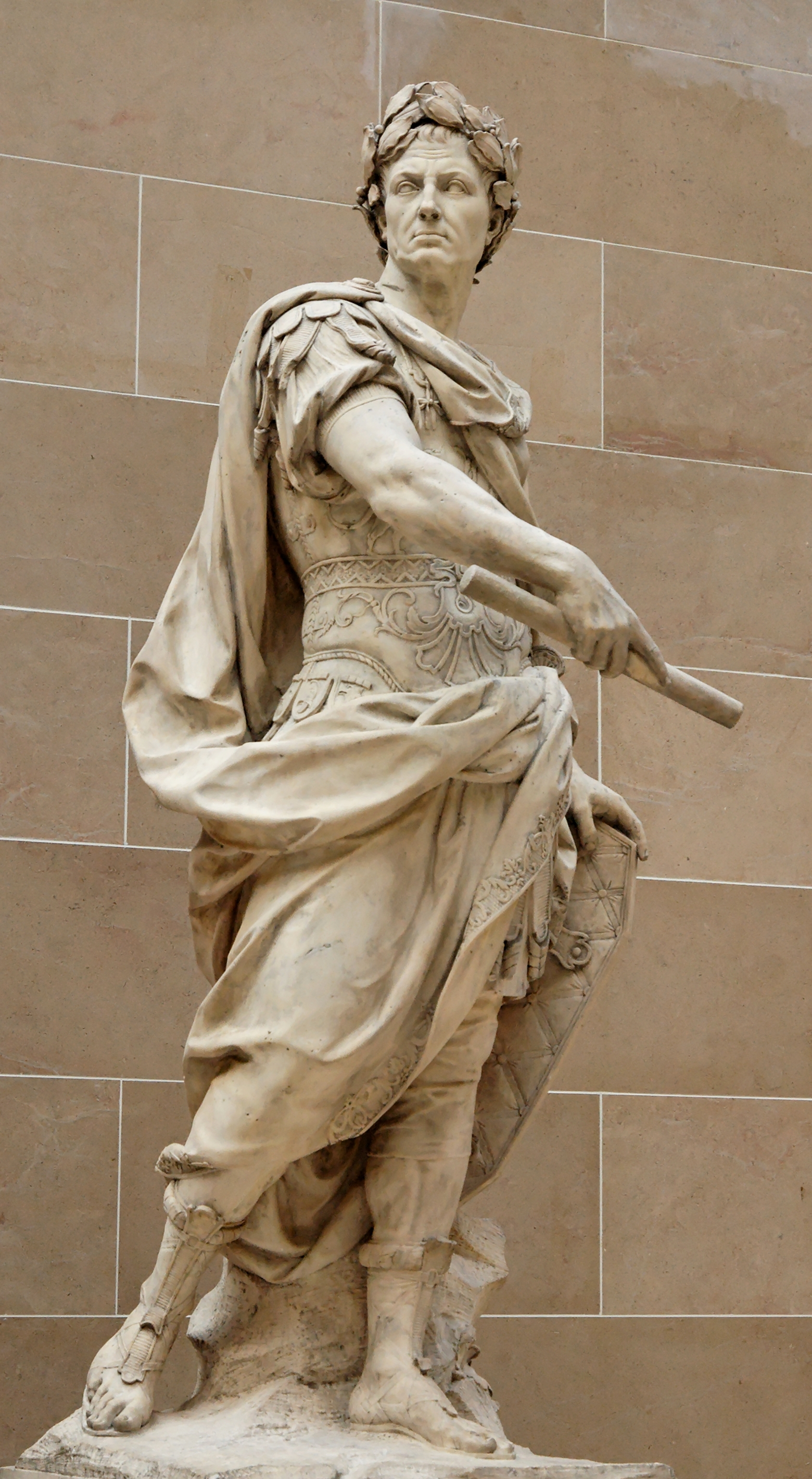
A statue of Julius Caesar

Authoritarian regimes are systems in which power is highly centralized, and often concentrated in the hands of a single leader or a small elite group. In these regimes, political opposition is often suppressed, with dissenting voices silenced through tactics such as censorship, imprisonment, or violence. Political freedoms, including freedom of speech and the press, are usually restricted or controlled by the government. Although some authoritarian regimes may hold elections, those elections are frequently neither free nor fair, and the results are typically manipulated to keep the regime in power. Political scientist Juan Linz states that an authoritarian government lacks both political pluralism and political mobilization. He states that an authoritarian regime specifically has vague limits on executive power in order to give more control to the executive branch.

For instance, Russia, since the Russian Revolution in 1918, holds elections where opposition is heavily restricted and media outlets are controlled. Similarly, since the Communist Party took control of China in 1949, the country has operated under an authoritarian regime where the party exercises strict control over the political system, curtails civil liberties, and restricts freedom of expression. Another notable example is the Roman Empire under Julius Caesar, which had a highly centralized government that transformed the Roman Republic into the Roman Empire.

=== Democratic ===
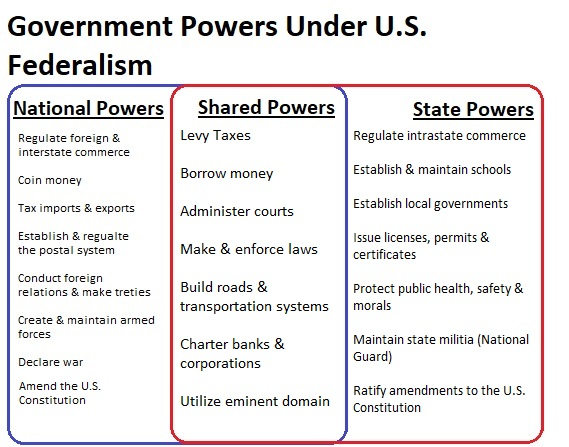
US Federalism Diagram

Democratic regimes are characterized by the rule of law, where laws ostensibly apply equally to all citizens, including government officials. In a democracy, citizens have the right to participate in free and fair elections, where they can vote for representatives and leaders in a competitive process, and so these reresentatives and leaders are authorized to rule the political entity. These regimes typically maintain a political system that ensures multiple political parties can compete for power, reflecting the political pluralism within the society. Democracies prioritize the protection of civil liberties, such as freedom of speech, assembly, and religion, which are fundamental rights guaranteed by the state.

A key feature of democratic regimes is the separation of powers between the executive, legislative, and judicial branches of government, ensuring that no one branch holds too much power and that each can act as a check on the others. Examples of democratic regimes include the United States, where power is divided into federal and state systems, and Germany, which features a parliamentary democracy with a strong focus on human rights. The term democracy can have positive connotations, but according to political scientist Samuel Huntington, democracy is a system of government with free and fair elections to hold leaders accountable. A contemporary viewpoint on democracy is Robert Dahl's concept of "polyarchy". Dahl argues that "democracy" is an ideal that no country has ever achieved.

=== Oligarchic ===
Minoritarianism is a neologism for a political structure or process in which a minority group of a population has a certain degree of primacy in that population's decision making, with legislative power or judicial power being held or controlled by a minority group rather than a majority that is representative of the population. Minoritarianism is sometimes used to describe minority rule, rule by a dominant minority such as an ethnic group delineated by religion, language, or some other identifying factor.

== Authority ==
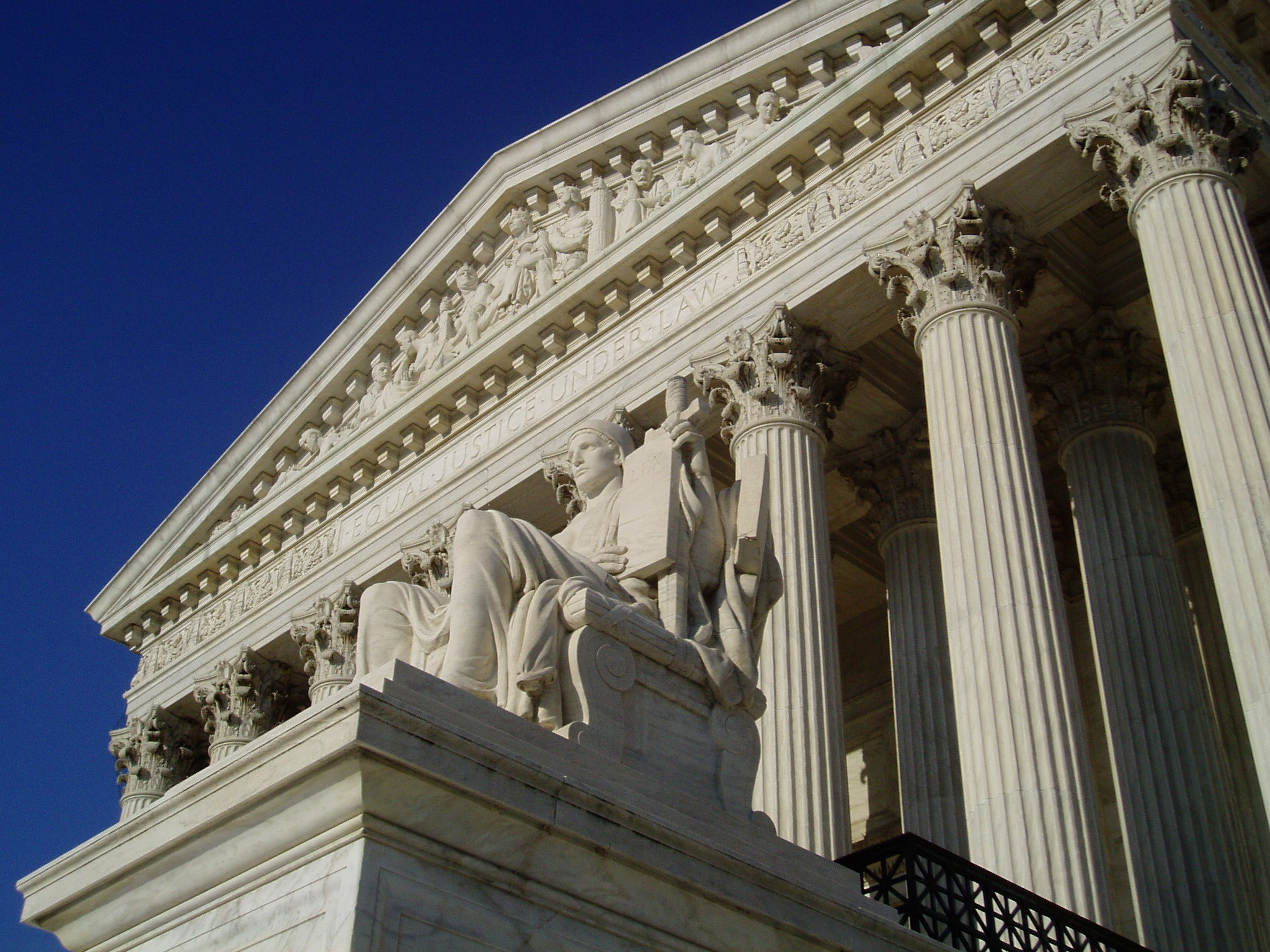
The Supreme Court of the United States is the highest judicial authority in the country

Authority is commonly understood as the legitimate power of a person or group over other people. In a civil state, authority may be practiced by legislative, executive, and judicial branches of government, each of which has authority and is an authority. The term "authority" has multiple nuances and distinctions within various academic fields ranging from sociology to political science, including religious studies.

The term authority identifies the political legitimacy, which grants and justifies rulers' right to exercise the power of government; and the term power identifies the ability to accomplish an authorized goal, either by compliance or by obedience; hence, authority is the power to make decisions and the legitimacy to make such legal decisions and order their execution.

Political authority grants members of a government the right to rule over citizens using coercion if necessary, while imposing an obligation on citizens to obey government orders (i.e., political obligation).

== Power politics ==
Power politics is a term which denotes an approach to political matters which aims to enhance the power of government actors. The term has much usage in the realm of international relations, and it is often used pejoratively.

The term particularly refers to international relations between independent states that recognize no higher political authority. These states are sovereign political units that maintain continuous and organized relationships with one another. These relationships include diplomacy, trade, peace, and war.

== Effects ==
Power changes those in the position of power and those who are targets of that power.

=== Approach/inhibition theory ===
Developed by D. Keltner and colleagues, approach/inhibition theory assumes that having power and using power alters psychological states of individuals. The theory is based on the notion that most organisms react to environmental events in two common ways. The reaction of approach is associated with action, self-promotion, seeking rewards, increased energy and movement. Inhibition, on the contrary, is associated with self-protection, avoiding threats or danger, vigilance, loss of motivation and an overall reduction in activity.

Overall, approach/inhibition theory holds that power promotes approach tendencies, while a reduction in power promotes inhibition tendencies.

=== Positive ===
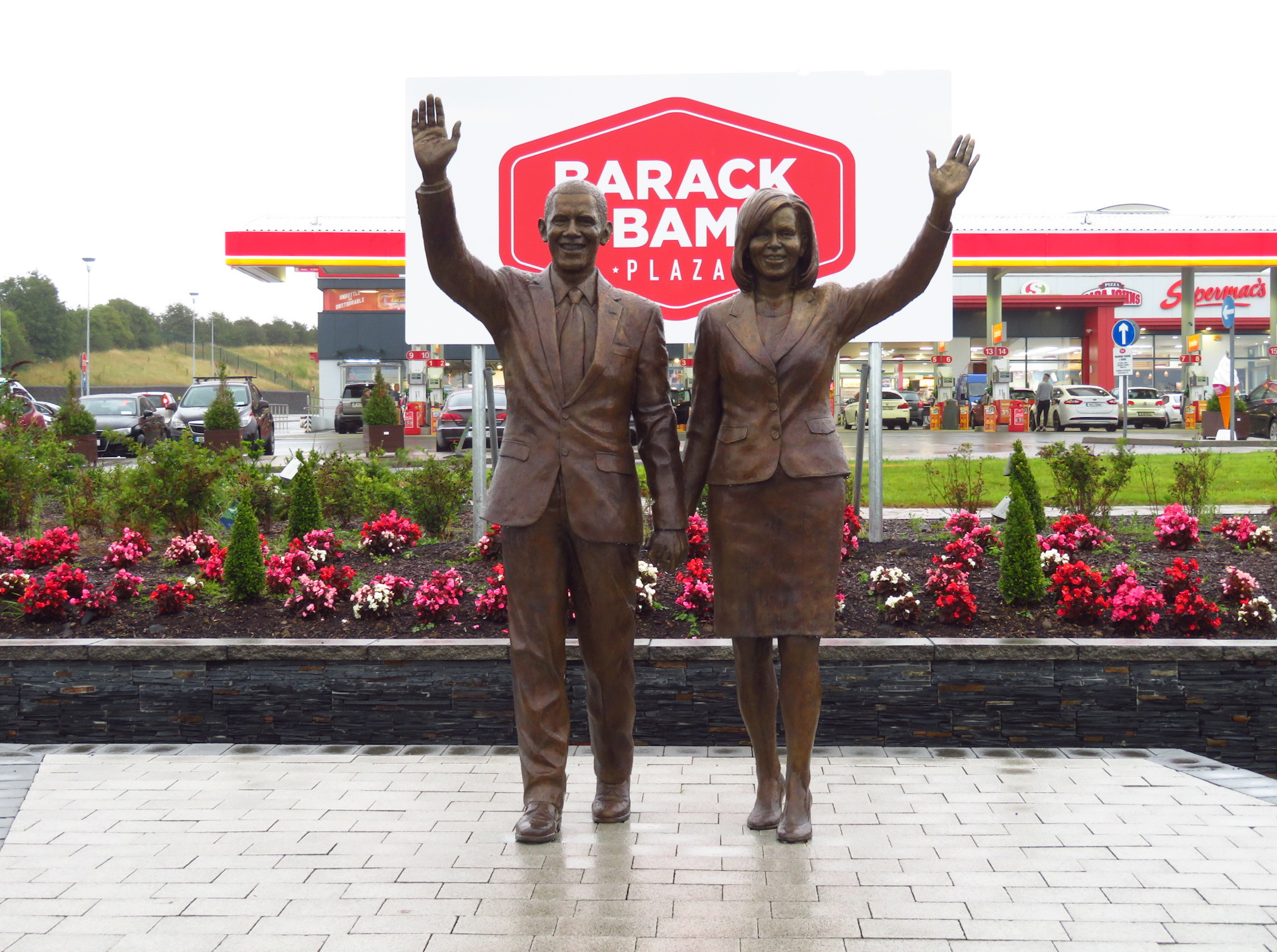
A statue of Barack Obama and Michelle Obama near Moneygall, Ireland.

- Power prompts people to take action
- Makes individuals more responsive to changes within a group and its environment
- Powerful people are more proactive, more likely to speak up, make the first move, and lead negotiation
- Powerful people are more focused on the goals appropriate in a given situation and tend to plan more task-related activities in a work setting
- Powerful people tend to experience more positive emotions, such as happiness and satisfaction, and they smile more than low-power individuals
- Power is associated with optimism about the future because more powerful individuals focus their attention on more positive aspects of the environment
- People with more power tend to carry out executive cognitive functions more rapidly and successfully, including internal control mechanisms that coordinate attention, decision-making, planning, and goal-selection

=== Negative ===
- Powerful people are prone to take risky, inappropriate, or unethical decisions and often overstep their boundaries
- They tend to generate negative emotional reactions in their subordinates, particularly when there is a conflict in the group
- When individuals gain power, their self-evaluation become more positive, while their evaluations of others become more negative
- Power tends to weaken one's social attentiveness, which leads to difficulty understanding other people's point of view
- Powerful people also spend less time collecting and processing information about their subordinates and often perceive them in a stereotypical fashion
- People with power tend to use more coercive tactics, increase social distance between themselves and subordinates, believe that non-powerful individuals are untrustworthy, and devalue work and ability of less powerful individuals

== Theories ==
=== Five bases of power ===
In a now-classic study (1959), social psychologists John R. P. French and Bertram Raven developed a schema of sources of power by which to analyse how power plays work (or fail to work) in a specific relationship.

French and Raven argue that there are five significant categories of such qualities, while not excluding other minor categories. Further bases have since been proposed, in particular by Gareth Morgan in his 1986 book, Images of Organization.

==== Expert power ====
Expert power is an individual's power deriving from the skills or expertise of the person and the organization's needs for those skills and expertise. Unlike the others, this type of power is usually highly specific and limited to the particular area in which the expert is trained and qualified. When they have knowledge and skills that enable them to understand a situation, suggest solutions, use solid judgment, and generally outperform others, then people tend to listen to them. When individuals demonstrate expertise, people tend to trust them and respect what they say. As subject-matter experts, their ideas will have more value, and others will look to them for leadership in that area.

==== Reward power ====
In terms of cancel culture, the mass ostracization used to reconcile unchecked injustice and abuse of power is an "upward power". Policies for policing the internet against these processes as a pathway for creating due process for handling conflicts, abuses, and harm that is done through established processes are known as "downward power".

==== Coercive power ====
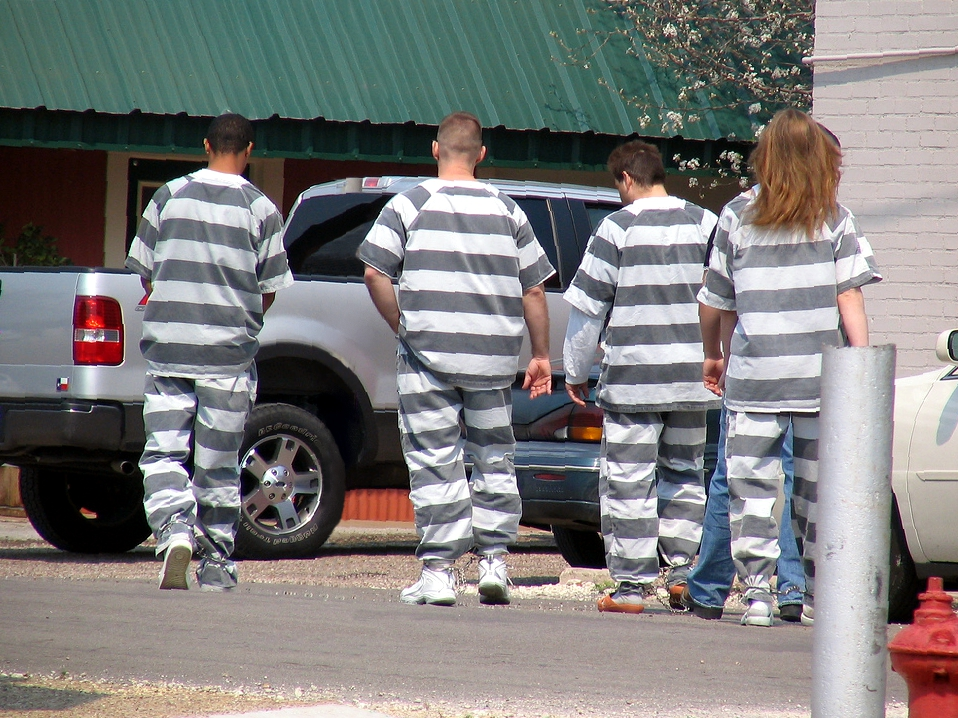
A chain gang of prisoners serving their sentences under the authority of the Texas Department of Criminal Justice in the United States.

Coercive power is the application of negative influences. It includes the ability to defer or withhold other rewards. This is a type of power commonly seen in the fashion industry by coupling with legitimate power; it is referred to in the industry-specific literature as "glamorization of structural domination and exploitation".

=== Principles in interpersonal relationships ===
According to Laura K. Guerrero and Peter A. Andersen in Close Encounters: Communication in Relationships, power in relationships is multifaceted. It can be perceived, relational, resource-based, and dependent on interest and commitment levels. While power often stems from controlling valued, scarce resources or having less dependence in a relationship, it is also shaped by behavior, social skills, and how others interpret one’s actions. Power can be enabling when used with confidence and skill, but disabling when it leads to manipulation, communication breakdowns, or relational dissatisfaction.

=== Cultural hegemony ===
In the Marxist tradition, the Italian writer Antonio Gramsci elaborated on the role of ideology in creating a cultural hegemony, which becomes a means of bolstering the power of capitalism and of the nation-state. Drawing on Niccolò Machiavelli in The Prince and trying to understand why there had been no Communist revolution in Western Europe while it was claimed there had been one in Russia, Gramsci conceptualised this hegemony as a centaur, consisting of two halves. The back end, the beast, represented the more classic material image of power: power through coercion, through brute force, be it physical or economic. But the capitalist hegemony, he argued, depended even more strongly on the front end, the human face, which projected power through 'consent'. In Russia, this power was lacking, allowing for a revolution. However, in Western Europe, specifically in Italy, capitalism had succeeded in exercising consensual power, convincing the working classes that their interests were the same as those of capitalists. In this way, a revolution had been avoided.

While Gramsci stresses the significance of ideology in power structures, Marxist-feminist writers such as Michele Barrett stress the role of ideologies in extolling the virtues of family life. The classic argument to illustrate this point of view is the use of women as a 'reserve army of labour'. In wartime, it is accepted that women perform masculine tasks, while after the war, the roles are easily reversed. Therefore, according to Barrett, the destruction of capitalist economic relations is necessary but not sufficient for the liberation of women.

=== Tarnow ===
Eugen Tarnow considers what power hijackers have over air plane passengers and draws similarities with power in the military. He shows that power over an individual can be amplified by the presence of a group. If the group conforms to the leader's commands, the leader's power over an individual is greatly enhanced, while if the group does not conform, the leader's power over an individual is non-existent.

=== Foucault ===
For Michel Foucault, the real power will always rely on the ignorance of its agents. No single human, group, or actor runs the dispositif (machine or apparatus), but power is dispersed through the apparatus as efficiently and silently as possible, ensuring its agents do whatever is necessary. It is because of this action that power is unlikely to be detected and remains elusive to 'rational' investigation. Foucault quotes a text reputedly written by political economist Jean Baptiste Antoine Auget de Montyon, entitled Recherches et considérations sur la population de la France (1778), but turns out to be written by his secretary Jean-Baptise Moheau (1745–1794), and by emphasizing biologist Jean-Baptiste Lamarck, who constantly refers to milieus as a plural adjective and sees into the milieu as an expression as nothing more than water, air, and light confirming the genus within the milieu, in this case the human species, relates to a function of the population and its social and political interaction in which both form an artificial and natural milieu. This milieu (both artificial and natural) appears as a target of intervention for power, according to Foucault, which is radically different from the previous notions on sovereignty, territory, and disciplinary space interwoven into social and political relations that function as a species (biological species). Foucault originated and developed the concept of "docile bodies" in his book Discipline and Punish. He writes, "A body is docile that may be subjected, used, transformed and improved.

=== Clegg ===
Stewart Clegg proposes another three-dimensional model with his "circuits of power" theory. This model likens the production and organization of power to an electric circuit board consisting of three distinct interacting circuits: episodic, dispositional, and facilitative. These circuits operate at three levels: two are macro and one is micro. The episodic circuit is at the micro level and is constituted of irregular exercise of power as agents address feelings, communication, conflict, and resistance in day-to-day interrelations. The outcomes of the episodic circuit are both positive and negative. The dispositional circuit is constituted of macro level rules of practice and socially constructed meanings that inform member relations and legitimate authority. The facilitative circuit is constituted of macro level technology, environmental contingencies, job design, and networks, which empower or disempower and thus punish or reward agency in the episodic circuit. All three independent circuits interact at "obligatory passage points", which are channels for empowerment or disempowerment.

=== Galbraith ===
John Kenneth Galbraith (1908–2006) in The Anatomy of Power (1983) summarizes the types of power as "condign" (based on force), "compensatory" (through the use of various resources) or "conditioned" (the result of persuasion), and the sources of power as "personality" (individuals), "property" (power-wielders' material resources), and/or "organizational" (from sitting higher in an organisational power structure).

=== Gene Sharp ===
Gene Sharp, an American professor of political science, believes that power ultimately depends on its bases. Thus, a political regime maintains power because people accept and obey its dictates, laws, and policies. Sharp cites the insight of Étienne de La Boétie.

Sharp's key theme is that power is not monolithic; that is, it does not derive from some intrinsic quality of those who are in power. For Sharp, political power, the power of any state – regardless of its particular structural organization – ultimately derives from the subjects of the state. His fundamental belief is that any power structure relies upon the subjects' obedience to the orders of the ruler(s). If subjects do not obey, leaders have no power.

His work is thought to have been influential in the overthrow of Slobodan Milošević, in the 2011 Arab Spring, and other nonviolent revolutions.

=== Björn Kraus ===
Björn Kraus deals with the epistemological perspective on power regarding the question of the possibilities of interpersonal influence by developing a special form of constructivism (named relational constructivism). Instead of focusing on the valuation and distribution of power, he asks first and foremost what the term can describe at all. Coming from Max Weber's definition of power, he realizes that the term power has to be split into "instructive power" and "destructive power". More precisely, instructive power means the chance to determine the actions and thoughts of another person, whereas destructive power means the chance to diminish the opportunities of another person. How significant this distinction really is, becomes evident by looking at the possibilities of rejecting power attempts: Rejecting instructive power is possible; rejecting destructive power is not. By using this distinction, proportions of power can be analyzed in a more sophisticated way, helping to sufficiently reflect on matters of responsibility. This perspective permits people to get over an "either-or-position" (either there is power or there is not), which is common, especially in epistemological discourses about power theories, and to introduce the possibility of an "as well as-position".

=== Counterpower ===
The term 'counter-power' (sometimes written 'counterpower') is used in a range of situations to describe the countervailing force that can be utilised by the oppressed to counterbalance or erode the power of elites. A general definition has been provided by the anthropologist David Graeber as 'a collection of social institutions set in opposition to the state and capital: from self-governing communities to radical labor unions to popular militias'. Graeber also notes that counter-power can also be referred to as 'anti-power' and 'when institutions [of counter-power] maintain themselves in the face of the state, this is usually referred to as a 'dual power' situation'. Tim Gee, in his 2011 book Counterpower: Making Change Happen, put forward the theory that those disempowered by governments' and elite groups' power can use counterpower to counter this. In Gee's model, counterpower is split into three categories: idea counterpower, economic counterpower, and physical counterpower.

Although the term has come to prominence through its use by participants in the global justice/anti-globalization movement of the 1990s onwards, the word has been used for at least 60 years; for instance, Martin Buber's 1949 book 'Paths in Utopia' includes the line 'Power abdicates only under the stress of counter-power'.

== Reactions ==
=== Tactics ===
A number of studies demonstrate that harsh power tactics (e.g. punishment (both personal and impersonal), rule-based sanctions, and non-personal rewards) are less effective than soft tactics (expert power, referent power, and personal rewards). It is probably because harsh tactics generate hostility, depression, fear, and anger, while soft tactics are often reciprocated with cooperation. Coercive and reward power can also lead group members to lose interest in their work, while instilling a feeling of autonomy in one's subordinates can sustain their interest in work and maintain high productivity even in the absence of monitoring.

Coercive influence creates conflict that can disrupt entire group functioning. When disobedient group members are severely reprimanded, the rest of the group may become more disruptive and uninterested in their work, leading to negative and inappropriate activities spreading from one troubled member to the rest of the group. This effect is called Disruptive contagion or ripple effect and it is strongly manifested when reprimanded member has a high status within a group, and authority's requests are vague and ambiguous.

=== Resistance to coercive influence ===
Coercive influence can be tolerated when the group is successful, the leader is trusted, and the use of coercive tactics is justified by group norms. Furthermore, coercive methods are more effective when applied frequently and consistently to punish prohibited actions.

However, in some cases, group members chose to resist the authority's influence. When low-power group members have a feeling of shared identity, they are more likely to form a Revolutionary Coalition, a subgroup formed within a larger group that seeks to disrupt and oppose the group's authority structure. Group members are more likely to form a revolutionary coalition and resist an authority when authority lacks referent power, uses coercive methods, and asks group members to carry out unpleasant assignments. It is because these conditions create reactance, individuals strive to reassert their sense of freedom by affirming their agency for their own choices and consequences.

=== Kelman's compliance-identification-internalization theory of conversion ===
Herbert Kelman identified three basic, step-like reactions that people display in response to coercive influence: compliance, identification, and internalization. This theory explains how groups convert hesitant recruits into zealous followers over time.

At the stage of compliance, group members comply with authority's demands, but personally do not agree with them. If authority does not monitor the members, they will probably not obey.

Identification occurs when the target of the influence admires and therefore imitates the authority, mimics authority's actions, values, characteristics, and takes on behaviours of the person with power. If prolonged and continuous, identification can lead to the final stage – internalization.

When internalization occurs, individual adopts the induced behaviour because it is congruent with his/her value system. At this stage, group members no longer carry out authority orders but perform actions that are congruent with their personal beliefs and opinions. Extreme obedience often requires internalization.

== See also ==
- Authority bias – Cognitive bias
- Authority distribution
- Discourse of power
- Economic power – Geopolitical concept
- Pluralism (political theory) – View of politics as governmental but under heavy influence of non-governmental groups
- Power (international relations) – Concept in international relations
- Power sharing – Practice in conflict resolution
- Power vacuum – Term used in political science
- Separation of powers – Division of a state's government into branches
- Social control – Concept in the social and political sciences
- Speaking truth to power – Non-violent political tactic employed by dissidents
