= Stefan Weber (media researcher) =

Austrian media researcher and writer

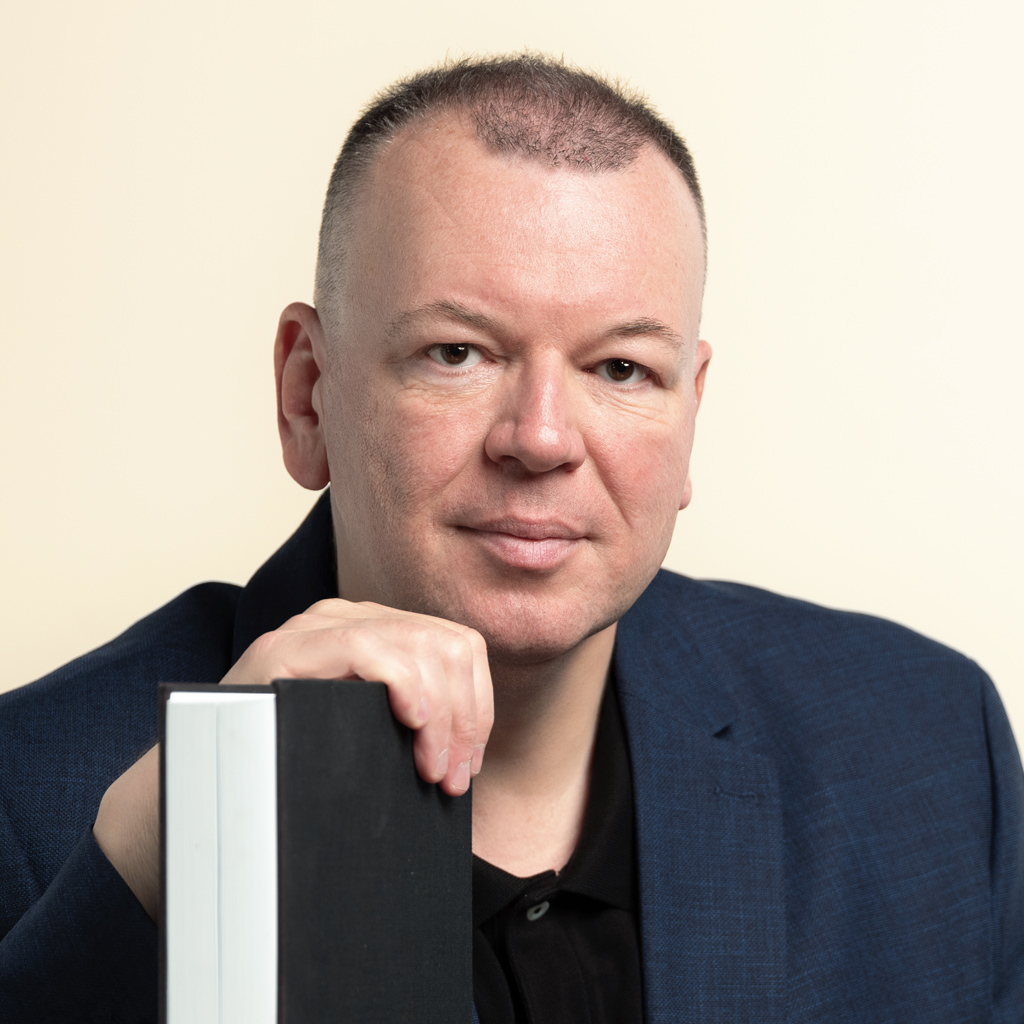
- Born: 1970 (age 55–56); Salzburg, Austria
- Education: University of Salzburg; University of Vienna
- Occupations: Media research; Plagiarism blogging

Stefan Weber is an Austrian freelance media researcher and writer. Weber has been called a "plagiarism hunter" (Plagiatsjäger). He has uncovered several high key cases of intellectual fraud in publications (mostly theses) that led to public investigations and final withdrawal of academic titles, while in various other cases, his allegations were dismissed. Weber's methods and motives were repeatedly criticized; he was also convicted of defamation in court.

== Biography ==
Weber was born in Salzburg. He studied journalism and communication science at the University of Salzburg and subsequently worked in Salzburg as a journalist and university lecturer. In 2005 he completed his Habilitation at the University of Vienna. Weber blames personal conflicts for not being able to pursue a further academic career.

When Weber discovered in 2005 that a Tübingen theologian, in 2004, had copied approximately half of his doctoral thesis more or less verbatim from Weber's own 1996 thesis, he launched a public media campaign to draw attention to the problem of plagiarism in academia. The Tübingen plagiarist had his doctoral degree retracted in July 2005. In addition, he received a criminal court sentence in 2007.

In 2007, Weber co-authored a Google-critical study, and published the book The Google-Copy-Paste-Syndrome.

In January 2026, Weber, on behalf of the far-right Freedom Party of Austria (FPÖ) and during a joint press conference with FPÖ secretary general Christian Hafenecker, criticized the report on right-wing extremism compiled by the Documentation Centre of Austrian Resistance on behalf of the Austrian Ministries of the Interior and Justice.

Weber publishes comments on various issues on his Blog für Ehrlichkeit, literally Blog for Honesty (formerly, until August 2025, Blog für wissenschaftliche Redlichkeit), and runs a business that offers investigations into scientific theses and resumes as well as related public relations works.

== Public plagiarism allegations ==
Weber has raised allegations against several high-profile public personalities. While Weber has uncovered a number of plagiarism incidents, he has been criticized for his methods and his conclusions with critics accusing him of running campaigns based on misrepresentations due to personal motivations. Silvia Ettl-Huber, professor of economics at a University of Applied Sciences criticized Weber for defining plagiarism as a deviation from his own standards which leads to, for example, repeated quotes of a single author being accused of plagiarism.

In 2007, Weber accused the then minister of science Johannes Hahn of having copied "dozens of pages" of his dissertation. An examination conducted on behalf of the University of Vienna found that Hahn had not appropriated works of other authors and concluded that the thesis was likely compliant with the then valid citation style which was also suggested by the supervisor of the thesis Peter Kampits but would not comply with modern rules for citations. In 2020, Weber found that the general manager of a subsidiary company of the Burgtheater had wrongly claimed to hold a doctorate in mathematics. In 2021, Weber discovered sections in the dissertation and diploma thesis of then minister for labour Christine Aschbacher, which consisted of nonsensical rants that lacked grammar and scientific standards. As a consequence, Aschbacher resigned from her office. In 2024, Weber claimed that the editor-in-chief of Süddeutsche Zeitung had plagiarized her dissertation and had fraudulently copied journalistic articles. An examination of the dissertation conducted by the University of Salzburg found "no relevant scientific misconduct", a review by Süddeutsche Zeitung found that in about two thirds of the cases, Weber had found texts which other websites had copied from Süddeutsche Zeitung without identifying that Süddeutsche Zeitung was the original publisher. Other parts of texts Weber had accused of plagiarism were commonly quoted facts, official statements or general definitions. In the aftermath, Weber was accused of advancing a smear campaign run against Süddeutsche Zeitung and its staff by right-wing internet activists.

In 2025 Weber started making public allegations against Frauke Brosius-Gersdorf after she had been nominated by the German Social Democrats as a candidate for the German Federal Constitutional Court in July 2025.

== Criticism and law suit ==
His motivation and methods were suspected in several cases while his media perception became mostly negative.

In June 2024, Weber was convicted in the first instance by the Salzburg regional court (Landesgericht) in the case of Oliver Vitouch v. Weber for defamation under section 6 of the Austrian Media Act in conjunction with the Austrian Criminal Code. This was due to false and malicious allegations on Weber's blog in January 2024 regarding the dismissal of two professors at the University of Klagenfurt in 2015 and 2017. In February 2025, the appellate court (Oberlandesgericht Linz) fully confirmed the sentence. Weber was judicially ordered to pay compensation of EUR 4,000 for defamation, to publish the verdict on his blog and to pay the court and lawyer fees. The judgment is final.

== Publications ==
Monographs (in German):

- Nachrichtenkonstruktion im Boulevardmedium. Die Wirklichkeit der "Kronen Zeitung" (Passagen, Vienna, 1995), ISBN 3-851-65163-4
- Die Dualisierung des Erkennens. Zu Konstruktivismus, Neurophilosophie und Medientheorie (Passagen, Vienna, 1996), ISBN 3-851-65245-2
- Wie journalistische Wirklichkeiten entstehen ("Schriftenreihe des Kuratoriums für Journalistenausbildung", Vol. 15, Salzburg, 1999)
- Was steuert Journalismus? Ein System zwischen Selbstreferenz und Fremdsteuerung (UVK Medien, Konstanz, 2000), ISBN 3-896-69293-3, reviewed by Matthias Kohring
- Medien - Systeme - Netze. Elemente einer Theorie der Cyber-Netzwerke (Transcript, Bielefeld, 2001), ISBN 3-933-12777-7, reviewed by Alexander Görke
- Non-dualistische Medientheorie. Eine philosophische Grundlegung (UVK, Konstanz, 2005), ISBN 3-896-69474-X, reviewed by Armin Scholl, reviewed by Roland Graf
- So arbeiten Österreichs Journalisten für Zeitungen und Zeitschriften ("Schriftenreihe des Kuratoriums für Journalistenausbildung", Vol. 18, Salzburg, 2006)
- Das Google-Copy-Paste-Syndrom. Wie Netzplagiate Ausbildung und Wissen gefährden (Heise/"Telepolis" at dpunkt, Hannover-Heidelberg, 2007; 2nd revised edition 2009), ISBN 3-936-93137-2, reviewed by Dennis Deicke, reviewed by Steffen Büffel
- Die Medialisierungsfalle. Kritik des digitalen Zeitgeists (Edition Va Bene/"Eine Analyse", Vienna-Klosterneuburg, 2008), ISBN 3-851-67209-7, the author in talk with Britta Bürger concerning his book

Editorships (in German and English, selection):

- Was konstruiert Kunst? Kunst an der Schnittstelle von Konstruktivismus, Systemtheorie und Distinktionstheorie (Passagen, Vienna, 1999), ISBN 3-851-65357-2, reviewed by Christian Huck
- Theorien der Medien. Von der Kulturkritik bis zum Konstruktivismus (UVK at UTB, Konstanz, 2003; 2nd revised edition 2010), ISBN 3-825-22424-4, reviewed by Lars Rademacher, reviewed by Wilhelm Schwendemann, reviewed by Sven Grampp and Jörg Seifert, reviewed by Stefan Höltgen
- With Alexander Riegler (eds.): The Non-dualizing Philosophy of Josef Mitterer. Brussels-Dresden 2008, ISSN 1782-348X (Special issue of "Constructivist Foundations", http://www.univie.ac.at/constructivism/journal/3/3)
- With Alexander Riegler (eds.): Die Dritte Philosophie. Kritische Beiträge zu Josef Mitterers Non-Dualismus (Velbrück Wissenschaft, Weilerswist, 2010; 2nd edition 2011), ISBN 3-938-80888-8, reviewed by Peter Strasser, reviewed by Andrea Roedig
- With Alexander Riegler (eds.): Non-dualism: A Conceptual Revision? Brussels 2013, ISSN 1782-348X (Special issue of "Constructivist Foundations", http://www.univie.ac.at/constructivism/journal/8/2)
