= Protestant University for Applied Sciences Freiburg =

Coordinates: 47°59′51″N 7°48′14″E

Protestant University of Applied Sciences Freiburg
- Evangelische Hochschule Freiburg
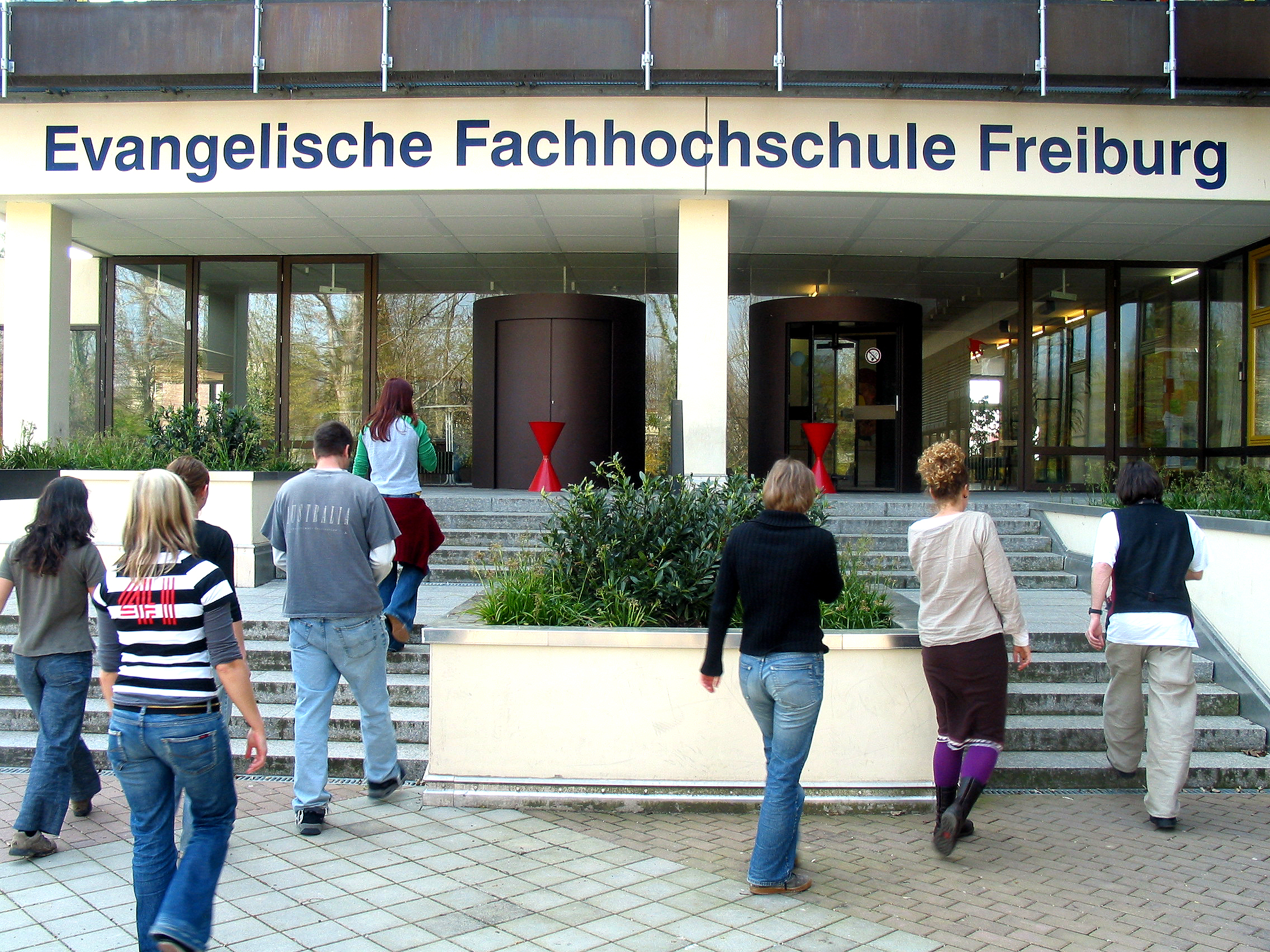
- Entrance of the university (dated)
- Type: Public
- Established: 1918
- Affiliations: Evangelical Church in Baden
- President: Prof. Dr. Renate Kirchhoff
- Vice-president: Prof. Dr. Björn Kraus
- Academic staff: 127 (WS 05/06)
- Students: ca. 1.000
- Location: Freiburg, Baden-Württemberg, Germany
- Website: http://www.eh-freiburg.de

The Protestant University of Applied Sciences Freiburg (German name: Evangelische Hochschule Freiburg (EH)) is a university of social work, diakonia and religious education. It is a confessional, state-approved university located in Freiburg. The responsible body is the Protestant regional church of Baden (Evangelische Landeskirche in Baden). Baden is the name of the area in the South-West of Germany, belonging to the State of Baden-Württemberg. Note that in Germany the title protestant, although referring to the Protestant Churches sponsorship, does not influence the tuitional and scientific content taught in this institution. In this context, churchly managed universities do not differ from state-run universities.

The students of social work and religious education obtain a bachelor's degree. It is called Bachelor of Arts, diploma supplement Soziale Arbeit (includes social work and social pedagogy) or religious education.

An additional voluntary course of study leads to a special certificate in sport-related social work. In cooperation with the Südbadische Sportschule Steinbach the Hochschule offers training in sports-related youth and social work for disadvantaged children and adolescents.

== History ==
The Protestant University of Applied Sciences Freiburg was founded as a vocational school for women in religious and social work (Evangelische Frauenberufsschule für kirchliche und soziale Arbeit) in October 1918. The education started with 12 women between 20 and 42 years. In 1956 six men were able to begin their studies.
