= Hasso Hofmann =

German philosopher and jurist (1934–2021)

- Born: 4 August 1934; Würzburg, Bavaria, Germany
- Died: 21 January 2021 (aged 86); Würzburg, Bavaria, Germany
- Occupations: Philosopher; Jurist

Hasso Hofmann (4 August 1934 – 21 January 2021) was a German philosopher and jurist.

== Biography ==
Hofmann studied philosophy and law at Heidelberg University, LMU Munich, and the University of Erlangen–Nuremberg under professors such as Ernst Forsthoff, Wolfgang Kunkel, Hans-Georg Gadamer, and Karl Löwith. After the Staatsexamen, he became a certified lawyer. He taught at the University of Würzburg from 1976 to 1992, when he became a professor at the Humboldt University of Berlin, eventually serving as Vice-President of the university. From 1989 to 1990, he was a fellow at the Berlin Institute for Advanced Study and became a member of the Vereinigung für Verfassungsgeschichte. He was also a member of the Bavarian Academy of Sciences and Humanities and the Berlin-Brandenburg Academy of Sciences and Humanities.

Hasso Hofmann died in Würzburg on 21 January 2021 at the age of 86.

== Publications ==
- Legitimität gegen Legalität. Der Weg der politischen Philosophie Carl Schmitts (1964)
- Repräsentation. Studien zur Wort- und Begriffsgeschichte von der Antike bis ins 19. Jahrhundert (1974)
- Legitimität und Rechtsgeltung. Verfassungstheoretische Bemerkungen zu einem Problem der Staatslehre und der Rechtsphilosophie (1977)
- Rechtsfragen der atomaren Entsorgung (1981)
- Recht – Politik – Verfassung. Studien zur Geschichte der politischen Philosophie (1986)
- Verfassungsrechtliche Perspektiven. Aufsätze aus den Jahren 1980–1994 (1995)
- Einführung in die Rechts- und Staatsphilosophie (2000)
- Recht und Kultur. Drei Reden (= Wissenschaftliche Abhandlungen und Reden zur Philosophie, Politik und Geistesgeschichte (2009)
- Rechtsphilosophie nach 1945. Zur Geistesgeschichte der Bundesrepublik Deutschland (2012)
