= Ernst von Glasersfeld =

German philosopher (1917–2010)

- Ernst von Glasersfeld in 2008
- Occupation: Professor of psychology

Academic background
- Education: Lyceum Alpinum Zuoz

Academic work
- Discipline: Philosopher, psychologist
- Sub-discipline: Radical constructivism
- Institutions: University of Georgia; Scientific Reasoning Research Institute; University of Massachusetts Amherst

Ernst von Glasersfeld (8 March 1917 – 12 November 2010) was a German philosopher, and emeritus professor of psychology at the University of Georgia, research associate at the Scientific Reasoning Research Institute, and adjunct professor in the Department of Psychology at the University of Massachusetts Amherst. He was a member of the board of trustees of the American Society for Cybernetics, from which he received the McCulloch Memorial Award in 1991. He was a member of the scientific board of the Instituto Piaget, Lisbon. Glasersfeld is known for the development of radical constructivism.

== Biography ==
Glasersfeld was born in Munich, where his father, Leopold, worked as a cultural attaché in Vienna before going into photography after World War I. He was a student of mathematics at the University of Vienna before having to move out because of the Nazi threat, considering that his Pan-European family (they subscribed to the ideology of Richard von Coudenhove-Kalergi) was known to be "enemies of any form of nationalism" and his grandfather was Jewish (a convert to Roman Catholicism).

The younger Glasersfeld thus spent large parts of his life in Ireland (1940s), in Italy (1950s) where he worked with Silvio Ceccato, and in the United States. He graduated from Lyceum Alpinum Zuoz, a Swiss boarding school. He studied and elaborated upon the work of Giambattista Vico, Jean Piaget's genetic epistemology, Bishop Berkeley's theory of perception, James Joyce's Finnegans Wake, and other important texts. Von Glasersfeld developed his model of radical constructivism, which is an ethos shared by all of these writers to one degree or another.

The Ernst von Glasersfeld Archive, part of the Research Institute Brenner-Archiv at the University of Innsbruck, maintains the literary estate and also organizes the Ernst von Glasersfeld Lectures. The literary executors are Theo Hug and Josef Mitterer.

On the occasion of Ernst von Glasersfeld's 100th birthday in 2017, the international conference "Radical Constructivism – Past, Present and Future" took place at the University of Innsbruck.

== Honors and awards ==
- 1991: Warren McCulloch Memorial Award of the American Society for Cybernetics
- 1997: Honorary doctorate of the University of Klagenfurt
- 2002: Reconnaissance du Mérite scientifique of the University of Quebec
- 2005: The Wiener Gold Medal of the American Society for Cybernetics
- 2005: Gregory Bateson-award of the Heidelberg Institute for Systemic Research e.V.
- 2007: Journal of Constructivist Foundations honoured him on his 90th birthday with a Festschrift Glasersfeld
- 2007: Austrian Cross of Honour for Science and Art, 1st class
- 2008: Honorary doctorate of the University of Innsbruck
- 2009: Honorary Medal of the City of Vienna in gold

== Selected publications ==
- Glasersfeld, E. von, (2001) The radical constructivist view of science. In: A. Riegler (Ed.), Foundations of Science, special issue on "The Impact of Radical Constructivism on Science", vol.6, no. 1–3: 31–43.
- Glasersfeld, E. von (1989). “Cognition, Construction of Knowledge and Teaching.” Synthese, 80(1),121-140.
- Glasersfeld, E. von (1990). "Environment and Communication". In L.P. Steffe & T. Wood (eds.), Transforming Children's Mathematics Education: International Perspectives, (pp. 30–38). Hillsdale, NJ: Lawrence Erlbaum.
- Glasersfeld, E. von (1992). “Questions and Answers About Radical Constructivism.” In M.K. Pearsall (ed.), Scope, Sequence, and Coordination of Secondary Schools Science, Vol. 11, Relevant Research, (pp. 169–182). Washington DC: NSTA.

== See also ==
- Yerkish – an artificial language Glasersfeld helped create
