= Constructivist Foundations =

Academic journal

Constructivist Foundations is an international triannual peer-reviewed academic journal that focuses on constructivist approaches to science and philosophy, including radical constructivism, enactive cognitive science, second-order cybernetics, biology of cognition and the theory of autopoietic systems, and non-dualizing philosophy. It was established in 2005 and the editor-in-chief is Alexander Riegler (Free University of Brussels).

== Content ==
The journal publishes scholarly articles with empirical, formal or conceptual content, survey articles providing an extensive overview, target articles which are openly discussed in commentaries, opinions, and book reviews. In addition to regular issues, the journal occasionally publishes special issues.

=== Statistics ===
(as of November 2019)

- 42 issues
- 613 authors
- 1071 scholarly texts
- 4,724 pages
- 12,983 readers

== Abstracting and indexing ==
The journal is abstracted and indexed in the Arts & Humanities Citation Index, Current Contents/Arts & Humanities, Philosopher's Index, PhilPapers, Scopus, and Education Research Complete.

== History ==
The inaugural issue of Constructivist Foundations was presented at the 2005 meeting of the American Society for Cybernetics.

Originally, the articles in CF were meant to explore mainly von Glasersfeld's radical constructivism. The scope expanded to include "constructivist approaches."

"In very general terms, constructivist approaches can be said to support the idea that mental structures such as cognition and perception are actively built by one's mind rather than passively acquired. They emphasize the primacy of the cognitive system and its organizational closure. In the understanding of constructivism, cognition is not about creating representations of a mind-independent reality but constructing reality."

== See also ==
- Constructivist epistemology
- Autopoiesis
- Cybernetics
- Enactivism
- Neurophenomenology
- Heinz von Foerster
- Ernst von Glasersfeld
- Ranulph Glanville
