= Constructivism (philosophy of science) =

Branch in philosophy of science

Constructivism is a view in the philosophy of science that maintains that scientific knowledge is constructed by the scientific community, which seeks to measure and construct models of the natural world. Constructivists have a relativist ontology and a socially co-constructed epistemology: they believe multiple realities exist because these realities are socially co-constructed. According to constructivists, natural science consists of mental constructs that aim to explain sensory experiences and measurements, and that there is no single valid methodology in science but rather a diversity of useful methods. They also hold that the world is independent of human minds, but knowledge of the world is always a human and social construction. Constructivism opposes the philosophy of objectivism, embracing the belief that human beings can come to know the truth about the natural world not mediated by scientific approximations with different degrees of validity and accuracy.

== Constructivism and sciences ==
=== Social constructivism in sociology ===
One version of social constructivism contends that categories of knowledge and reality are actively created by social relationships and interactions. These interactions also alter the way in which scientific episteme is organized.

Social activity presupposes human interaction, and in the case of social construction, utilizing semiotic resources (meaning-making and signifying) with reference to social structures and institutions. Several traditions use the term Social Constructivism: psychology (after Lev Vygotsky), sociology (after Peter Berger and Thomas Luckmann, themselves influenced by Alfred Schütz), sociology of knowledge (David Bloor), sociology of mathematics (Sal Restivo), philosophy of mathematics (Paul Ernest). Ludwig Wittgenstein's later philosophy can be seen as a foundation for social constructivism, with its key theoretical concepts of language games embedded in forms of life.

=== Constructivism in philosophy of science ===
Thomas Kuhn argued that changes in scientists' views of reality not only contain subjective elements but result from group dynamics, "revolutions" in scientific practice, and changes in "paradigms". As an example, Kuhn suggested that the Sun-centric Copernican "revolution" replaced the Earth-centric views of Ptolemy not because of empirical failures but because of a new "paradigm" that exerted control over what scientists felt to be the more fruitful way to pursue their goals.

But paradigm debates are not really about relative problem-solving ability, though for good reasons they are usually couched in those terms. Instead, the issue is which paradigm should in future guide research on problems many of which neither competitor can yet claim to resolve completely. A decision between alternate ways of practicing science is called for, and in the circumstances that decision must be based less on past achievement than on future promise. ... A decision of that kind can only be made on faith.

— Thomas Kuhn, The Structure of Scientific Revolutions, pp 157–8

The view of reality as accessible only through models was called model-dependent realism by Stephen Hawking and Leonard Mlodinow. While not rejecting an independent reality, model-dependent realism says that we can know only an approximation of it provided by the intermediary of models. These models evolve over time as guided by scientific inspiration and experiments.

In the field of the social sciences, constructivism as an epistemology urges that researchers reflect upon the paradigms that may be underpinning their research, and in the light of this that they become more open to considering other ways of interpreting any results of the research. Furthermore, the focus is on presenting results as negotiable constructs rather than as models that aim to "represent" social realities more or less accurately. Norma Romm, in her book Accountability in Social Research (2001), argues that social researchers can earn trust from participants and wider audiences insofar as they adopt this orientation and invite inputs from others regarding their inquiry practices and the results thereof.

=== Constructivism and psychology ===
In psychology, constructivism refers to many schools of thought that, though extraordinarily different in their techniques (applied in fields such as education and psychotherapy), are all connected by a common critique of previous standard objectivist approaches. Constructivist psychology schools share assumptions about the active constructive nature of human knowledge. In particular, the critique is aimed at the "associationist" postulate of empiricism, "by which the mind is conceived as a passive system that gathers its contents from its environment and, through the act of knowing, produces a copy of the order of reality."

In contrast, "constructivism is an epistemological premise grounded on the assertion that, in the act of knowing, it is the human mind that actively gives meaning and order to that reality to which it is responding". The constructivist psychologies theorize about and investigate how human beings create systems for meaningfully understanding their worlds and experiences.

=== Constructivism and education ===
Joe L. Kincheloe has published numerous social and educational books on critical constructivism (2001, 2005, 2008), a version of constructivist epistemology that places emphasis on the exaggerated influence of political and cultural power in the construction of knowledge, consciousness, and views of reality. In the contemporary mediated electronic era, Kincheloe argues, dominant modes of power have never exerted such influence on human affairs. Coming from a critical pedagogical perspective, Kincheloe argues that understanding a critical constructivist epistemology is central to becoming an educated person and to the institution of just social change.

Kincheloe's characteristics of critical constructivism:

- Knowledge is socially constructed: World and information co-construct one another
- Consciousness is a social construction
- Political struggles: Power plays an exaggerated role in the production of knowledge and consciousness
- The necessity of understanding consciousness—even though it does not lend itself to traditional reductionistic modes of measurability
- The importance of uniting logic and emotion in the process of knowledge and producing knowledge
- The inseparability of the knower and the known
- The centrality of the perspectives of oppressed peoples—the value of the insights of those who have suffered as the result of existing social arrangements
- The existence of multiple realities: Making sense of a world far more complex than we originally imagined
- Becoming humble knowledge workers: Understanding our location in the tangled web of reality
- Standpoint epistemology: Locating ourselves in the web of reality, we are better equipped to produce our own knowledge
- Constructing practical knowledge for critical social action
- Complexity: Overcoming reductionism
- Knowledge is always entrenched in a larger process
- The centrality of interpretation: Critical hermeneutics
- The new frontier of classroom knowledge: Personal experiences intersecting with pluriversal information
- Constructing new ways of being human: Critical ontology

== Constructivist approaches ==
=== Critical constructivism ===
A series of articles published in the journal Critical Inquiry (1991) served as a manifesto for the movement of critical constructivism in various disciplines, including the natural sciences. Not only truth and reality, but also "evidence", "document", "experience", "fact", "proof", and other central categories of empirical research (in physics, biology, statistics, history, law, etc.) reveal their contingent character as a social and ideological construction. Thus, a "realist" or "rationalist" interpretation is subjected to criticism. Kincheloe's political and pedagogical notion (above) has emerged as a central articulation of the concept.

=== Cultural constructivism ===
Cultural constructivism asserts that knowledge and reality are a product of their cultural context, meaning that two independent cultures will likely form different observational methodologies. The cultural constructivist standpoint sees "culture history, meaning, human agency, human experience and responsibility as focal, not ephemeral, concerns."

=== Genetic epistemology ===
James Mark Baldwin invented this expression, which was later popularized by Jean Piaget. From 1955 to 1980, Piaget was Director of the International Centre for Genetic Epistemology in Geneva.

=== Radical constructivism ===
Ernst von Glasersfeld was a prominent proponent of radical constructivism. This claims that knowledge is not a commodity that is transported from one mind into another. Rather, it is up to the individual to "link up" specific interpretations of experiences and ideas with their own reference of what is possible and viable. That is, the process of constructing knowledge, of understanding, is dependent on the individual's subjective interpretation of their active experience, not what "actually" occurs. Understanding and acting are seen by radical constructivists not as dualistic processes but "circularly conjoined".

Radical constructivism is closely related to second-order cybernetics.

Constructivist Foundations is a free online journal publishing peer-reviewed articles on radical constructivism by researchers from multiple domains.

=== Relational constructivism ===
Relational constructivism can be perceived as a relational consequence of radical constructivism. In contrary to social constructivism, it picks up the epistemological threads. It maintains the radical constructivist idea that humans cannot overcome their limited conditions of reception (i.e., self-referentially operating cognition). Therefore, humans are not able to come to objective conclusions about the world.

In spite of the subjectivity of human constructions of reality, relational constructivism focuses on the relational conditions applying to human perceptional processes. Björn Kraus puts it in a nutshell:

It is substantial for relational constructivism that it basically originates from an epistemological point of view, thus from the subject and its construction processes. Coming from this perspective it then focusses on the (not only social, but also material) relations under which these cognitive construction processes are performed. Consequently, it's not only about social construction processes, but about cognitive construction processes performed under certain relational conditions.

== Criticisms ==
Numerous criticisms have been levelled at various types of constructivism. A common strategy is to describe constructivism as essentially a kind of relativism and to attack it on that basis.

Another criticism of constructivism is that it holds that the concepts of two different social formations be entirely different and incommensurate. This being the case, it is impossible to make comparative judgments about statements made according to each worldview. This is because the criteria of judgment will themselves have to be based on some worldview or other. If this is the case, then it brings into question how communication between them about the truth or falsity of any given statement could be established.

The Wittgensteinian philosopher Gavin Kitching argues that constructivists usually implicitly presuppose a deterministic view of language, which severely constrains the minds and use of words by members of societies: they are not just "constructed" by language on this view but are literally "determined" by it. Kitching notes the contradiction here: somehow, the advocate of constructivism is not similarly constrained. While other individuals are controlled by the dominant concepts of society, the advocate of constructivism can transcend these concepts and see through them.

== See also ==
- Autopoiesis
- Consensus reality
- Constructivism in international relations
- Cultural pluralism
- Epistemological pluralism
- Tinkerbell effect
- Map–territory relation
- Meaning making
- Metacognition
- Ontological pluralism
- Personal construct psychology
- Perspectivism
- Pragmatism
