= 土地 =

土地 or 토지, meaning 'land', may refer to:

- Dilyimit Tudi, a Chinese footballer
- Land Bank of Taiwan, a bank in Taiwan
- Thổ Địa, the god of Vietnam
- Toji (novel), a Korean novel
  - The Land (1974 film), a South Korean film adapted from this novel
  - Toji, the Land, a South Korean drama adapted from this novel
- Tudi Township, Chongqing, China
- Turf, a fictional character from Hong Kong film Night King

== See also ==
- Land (disambiguation)
- Toji (disambiguation)
- Tudi (disambiguation)
- Turf (disambiguation)
