= Chung Hwan Kwak =

South Korean religious leader

- Born: January 22, 1936 (age 90)
- Occupation: religious leader

- Chung Hwan Kwak
- Hangul: 곽정환
- Hanja: 郭錠煥
- RR: Gwak Jeonghwan
- MR: Kwak Chŏnghwan

Chung Hwan Kwak (born January 22, 1936) is a South Korean religious leader. He was in leadership in the Unification Church until 2009. He was appointed to many lead positions in organizations related to the Unification Church by its founder Sun Myung Moon. Since 2002, he was the chairman and president of News World Communications, which owns United Press International, and other publications, including the Middle East Times, and Tiempos del Mundo, a Spanish-language newspaper published in 16 countries throughout the Americas. He was also the president of the Family Party for the Universal Peace and Unity, a South Korean political party founded by Unification Church members, one of whose main goals is the reunification of Korea. He was also the chairman of the Social Responsibility Committee for the Asian Football Confederation.

Kwak advocated The Washington Times to support international organizations such as the United Nations and to promote for world peace and interfaith understanding. This created difficulties for editor Wesley Pruden and some of the Times' columnists. Issues of contention included the Unification movement's reconciliatory attitude towards North Korea, which at the time included joint business ventures, and Kwak's advocacy for greater understanding between the United States and the Islamic world. David Ignatius, reporting for The Washington Post, predicted that conservatives in Congress and the George W. Bush administration would support Pruden's position over Kwak's.

Kwak's daughter, Jun Sook Kwak, is married to Moon's son, Hyun Jin Moon. Kwak left the Unification Church in 2009 after internal strife and is now the Honorary President of the Global Peace Foundation.

After the 2022 assassination of former Japanese Prime Minister Shinzo Abe by the son of a Unification Church member, Kwak held a press conference in which he apologized and blamed other Unification Church leaders.

== Speeches and writings ==
- collected speeches and writings

== See also ==
- List of Unification movement people
- Dong Moon Joo
- Bo Hi Pak
- Unification Church of the United States
