= Toji =

Toji may refer to:

- Marcus Toji, American actor (born 1984)
- Toji (novel), a saga novel written by Pak Kyongni
- The Land (1974 film), a 1974 South Korean film
- Toji, the Land (2004 TV series), a 2004 South Korean drama
- Alternative spelling for Tōji
