= World and I =

American monthly magazine

World and I was a monthly magazine owned by News World Communications, an international news media corporation founded by Unification Church founder Sun Myung Moon. World and I started as a full-color glossy magazine in 1986, published by The Washington Times. Its editor was University of Chicago political scientist Morton A. Kaplan. It covered a broad range of articles by scholars and experts in the areas of politics, economics, global studies, liberal arts, fine arts, general science, and books. The print magazine ceased publication in 2004 but it continued online until 2018. A review in Canadian Social Studies in 1997 wrote that, the magazine provided "an interdisciplinary approach to a wide range of contemporary world issues", "the combination of quality prose and vivid photography makes this magazine worthy of consideration by the teacher of senior high students".

It previously contained Spanish-language pages with articles from Tiempos del Mundo, a now defunct newsweekly published in the United States and 15 countries of Latin America.

World and I has previously launched special features for K-12 schools, including subscription based core curriculum pages, weekly ESL and Spanish pages, teacher's guide lesson plans.

The content of the journal is available online through databases such as Gale OneFile and EBSCO Host.
