= James R. Whelan =

American journalist (1933–2012)

- Born: July 27, 1933; Buffalo, New York, U.S.
- Died: December 1, 2012 (aged 79); Miami, Florida, U.S.
- Occupation: Journalist

Academic work
- Discipline: History

James R. Whelan (July 27, 1933 – December 1, 2012) was a journalist and historian who served as the first editor in chief of The Washington Times, holding the position from 1982 to 1984. He is also known as the author of several books, most of them on the recent political history of Latin America.

== Early life and education ==
Whelan was born on July 27, 1933, in Buffalo, New York. He attended Florida International University in Miami, where he graduated with a bachelor's degree in 1975.

== Career ==
Whelan began his career in journalism in 1952, much of which he spent in Latin America, including Chile, Mexico, and Venezuela. He started as a local correspondent for United Press International (UPI).

In 1964, while UPI manager for Venezuela, he was named a Nieman Fellow. He later served as managing editor of The Miami News and as vice president and editor of The Sacramento Union.

=== The Washington Times ===
In 1982, Whelan resigned from The Sacramento Union to work at the newly created Washington Times, serving as its first editor in chief and publisher. It was owned by the News World Communications, at which Whelan was later made an executive, which is affiliated with the Unification Church, although Whelan himself is not a member of the church. Whelen had initially rejected the offer to work at the new publication, but a persistent recruiting effort from Colonel Bo Hi Pak eventually changed his mind. In response to concerns over its church associations, Whelan promised the paper would be independent, citing a contract that promised autonomy. At a National Press Club luncheon in 1983, he complained about the sloppiness and hypocrisy of complaints made about the relationship with the church, stating that he himself had met the church's leader Sun Myung Moon only twice.

In 1984, Whelan unexpectedly left the paper. At a news conference, Whelan claimed that "senior members of the Unification Church Movement—the so-called Moonies—have seized direct control" of The Washington Times, and that this led to his sacking by Bo Hi Pak. Smith Hempstone, Whelan's successor, denied this, saying that a group of executives and editors, none of whom were members of the church, felt Whelan's removal would be better for the paper's "continued integrity."

=== Chile ===
After leaving The Washington Times, Whelan worked for the Latin American News Service. He lived in Chile, where he was as a visiting professor at the University of Chile and wrote on the history of Chile. In 2008, he moved back to the United States and lived in Miami.

== Death ==
He died of multiple organ failure at his home in Miami, at age 79.

== Bibliography ==
- Through the American Looking Glass: Central America's Crisis. Washington, D.C.: Council for Inter-American Security, 1980.
- Allende: Death of a Marxist Dream Westport, CT: Arlington House, 1981.
- Catastrophe in the Caribbean: The Failure of America's Human Rights Policy in Central America. Ottawa, IL: Jameson Books, 1984.
- The Soviet Assault on America's Southern Flank. Washington D.C.: Regnery Gateway, 1988.
- Out of the Ashes: Life, Death and Transfiguration of Democracy in Chile, 1833-1988. Washington, D.C.: Regnery Gateway, 1989.
- Hunters in the Sky: Fighter Aces of WWII. Washington, D.C.: Regnery Gateway, 1991.
- Desde las Cenizas. Santiago de Chile: Zig-Zag, 1993.
