= New York City Tribune =

Defunct American daily newspaper

- Type: Daily newspaper
- Format: Broadsheet
- Owner: News World Communications
- Founded: 1976
- Ceased publication: 1991; 35 years ago
- Headquarters: Manhattan, New York, New York, U.S.

The New York City Tribune was a daily newspaper that existed from 1976 to 1991 in New York City and was published by News World Communications, owned by the Unification Church and its leader Reverend Sun Myung Moon. Its offices were in the former Tiffany and Company Building at 401 Fifth Avenue. It was printed in Long Island City.

== History ==
The paper debuted under the name The News World and said it would provide an alternative to the existing New York dailies. The paper reached its peak circulation of 400,000 during the 1978 New York City newspaper strike, when some well-known reporters for papers closed by the strike wrote for it. But otherwise it failed to gain much traction with either readers or advertisers. By 1983, its circulation was around 70,000.

In 1983, the paper changed its name to the New York Tribune as part of a "metamorphosis" that nonetheless retained the same ownership and essentially the same staff. This brought a lawsuit on copyright grounds from International Herald Tribune, which had inherited the 'Tribune' name from the original New-York Tribune. The matter was resolved in 1984 when the paper added 'City' to its name. The new paper carried an expansive "Commentary" section of opinions and editorials, designed, it said, to showcase "syndicated columnists and outraged citizens" in opposition to liberalism in the United States and the Democratic Party. The paper became known for promoting the views of conservatism in the United States in not just its editorial stances but its news coverage as well.

Regardless of the changes, the paper still had economic troubles and suspended publication for several months during 1985. By 1990, its circulation was but 12,000, in comparison to four other New York daily papers each with circulation over 500,000. The New York City Tribune printed its last edition on January 3, 1991.

Its sister paper, The Washington Times, is circulated primarily in the nation's capital.
