= Tudi =

Tudi may refer to:

- Tudigong or Tudi, a Chinese tutelary deity
- Tudy of Landevennec, also known as Tudi, Medieval Breton saint
- Tudi Wiggins, Canadian actress
- Tudi Roche, American actress and singer
- Dilyimit Tudi, Chinese footballer

== Places ==
- Tudi Township, Chongqing, China
- Tudi, Iran, a village in Sangan Rural District, Khash County, Sistan and Baluchestan Province, Iran

== See also ==
- 土地 (disambiguation)
