= Park Kyong-ni Prize =

South Korean literary award

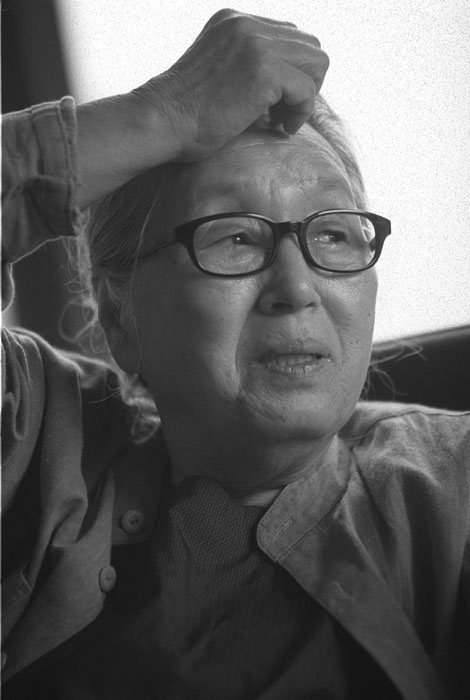
- Pak Kyongni
- Native name: 박경리 문학상
- Sponsored by: Toji Foundation of Culture
- Country: South Korea
- Status: Active
- First award: 2011
- Website: https://tojicf.com/sub/sub03_01.php

Park Kyong-ni Prize (Korean: 박경리 문학상) is an international literary award based in South Korea. It was established in 2011 in honor of Park Kyongni, known for her series Toji. The award was founded and sponsored by the Toji Foundation of Culture.

According to Complete Review, it was established to be the primary international literary award of South Korea. With a cash prize of $100,000 it is one of the richest literary prizes in the world.

== Winners ==
- 2011 Choi In-hun
- 2012 Lyudmila Ulitskaya, Daniel Stein, interpreter
- 2013 Marilynne Robinson
- 2014 Bernhard Schlink
- 2015 Amos Oz
- 2016 Ngũgĩ wa Thiong'o
- 2017 A. S. Byatt
- 2018 Richard Ford
- 2019 Ismail Kadare
- 2020 Yun Heunggil
- 2022 Amin Maalouf
- 2023 Christoph Ransmayr
- 2024 Sylvie Germain
- 2025 Amitav Ghosh
