= Kim Seong-kon =

South Korean literary scholar (born 1949)

- 김성곤
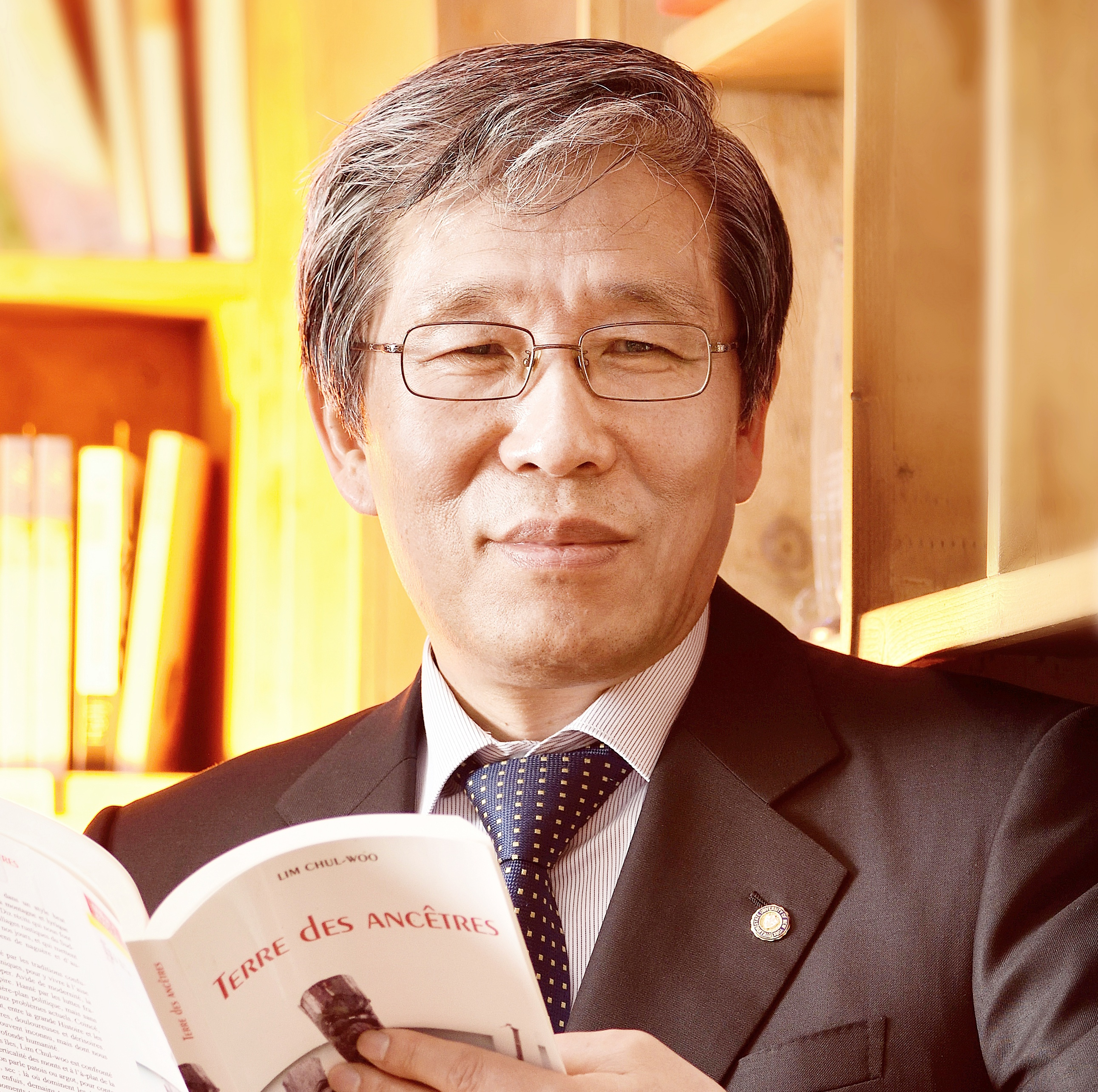
- Kim
- Born: 9 August 1949 (age 77)
- Education: Doctor of Philosophy
- Alma mater: SUNY/Buffalo, Columbia University
- Writing career
- Genres: Literary criticism (literature and novels)
- Subjects: Postmodernism, postcolonialism, cultural studies
- Notable works: Cultural Studies and the Future of the Humanities, Literature in the Age of New Media, Literature in the Globalizing World, Literature in the Age of Hybrid Cultures

Kim Seong-Kon (Korean: 김성곤; born 9 August 1949 in South Korea), also known as Seong-Kon Kim, is a South Korean academic, literary critic, film critic, columnist, editor and writer. Currently, Kim is a professor emeritus at Seoul National University.

Kim was the president of the LTI Korea (Literature Translation Institute of Korea) in the Ministry of Culture, Sports and Tourism of South Korea, which was an undersecretary-level post. On May 19, 2017, Kim received an Honorary Doctorate of Humane Letters from the State University of New York.

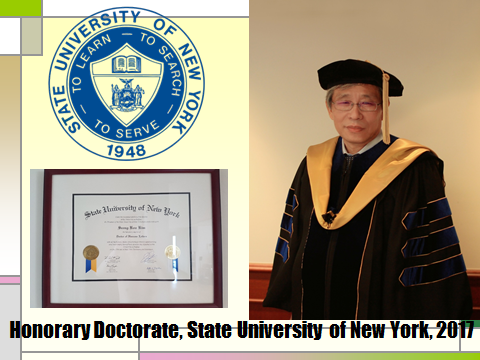
[IMG_00] Kim received an Honorary Doctorate in Humane Letters from the State University of New York.

"in recognition of the profound impact Professor Kim has had as a cultural and literary bridge between Korea and the United States." In 2018, Kim taught at George Washington University as Dean's Distinguished Visiting Professor in the Humanities and also at the University of Málaga in Spain as a visiting professor. In the same year, Kim was decorated by Felipe VI, King of Spain, with La Orden del Merito Civil (Cruz de Oficial).

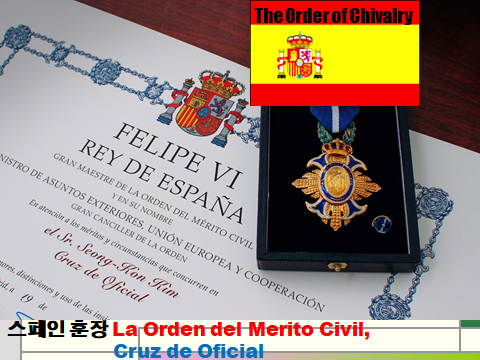
[IMG_01] Kim was decorated by King Felipe VI of Spain "La Orden del Merito Civil (Cruz de Oficial).

Kim taught at the University of California, Irvine, as a visiting professor. Currently, he is a visiting scholar at Dartmouth College. Before he died in 2022, O-Young Lee, the legendary South Korean literary and cultural critic, said that he had always thought of Seong-Kon Kim as his intellectual and spiritual heir and successor.

== Early life and education ==
Kim received his Ph.D. in English from the State University of New York at Buffalo, under the direction of the late Leslie A. Fiedler who first announced the Death of the Novel in the early sixties. Then he went to Columbia University to study comparative literature under the late Edward W. Said who authored "Orientalism." Upon completion of the Ph.D. coursework at Columbia, he joined the faculty of Seoul National University (SNU) in 1984.

== Career ==
=== Academia ===
Kim was dean of the SNU School of Language Education (2001–2005), director of the Language Research Institute (2001), director of the American Studies Institute (1999–2001), and director of the SNU Residence Hall (1987–1989) of Seoul National University. He was also director of the Seoul National University Press (2009–2011) and president of the Association of Korean University Presses (2010–2011). Kim was also chairman of the organizing committee for the annual BESETO (Beijing, Seoul and Tokyo) International Conference (1999–2001). In addition, Kim was president of the LTI Translation Academy, which offers various courses on translation studies for foreign and domestic students, and publisher of the LTI Korea Press and the quarterly English literary journal, Korean Literature Now.

He was the founding president of the Korean Association of Literature and Film from 1998 to 2001, and was president of the International Association of Comparative Korean Studies from 2001 to 2003, president of the Korean Association of Modern Fiction in English from 2004 to 2006, and president of the American Studies Association of Korea from 2007 to 2008. Kim was chairman of the Development and Promotion Council of the English Language and Literature Association of Korea from 2004 to 2005.

Kim has taught at Pennsylvania State University, University of California, Berkeley, and Brigham Young University as a visiting professor, and conducted research at Harvard Yenching Institute, University of Oxford and University of Toronto as a visiting scholar. A prizewinning literary critic, Kim initiated the debate on literary postmodernism for the first time in Korea in the late 1970s and early 1980s. He was also a pioneer in postcolonialism and cultural studies in Korea. His books on postmodernism, postcolonialism, and cultural studies have greatly influenced writers and scholars in the Korean republic of letters. In 2008, Kim received the prestigious Kim Hwantae Award for Literary Criticism and in 2014 the Woo Ho Humanities Award.

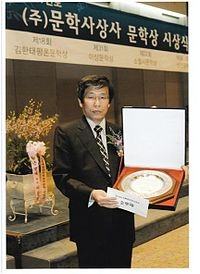
[IMG_02] Kim received the Kim Hwante Literary Criticism Award.

Kim was editor of literary journals such as Literature & Thought, 21st Century Literature and Contemporary World Literature. In addition, Kim has been a regularly featured columnist for the Korea Herald since 2003.

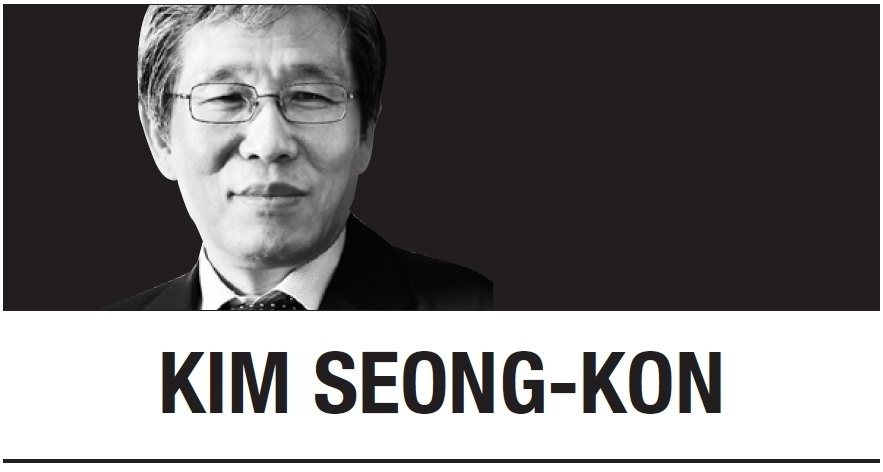
[IMG_03] Kim has been writing Editorial/Opinion columns for The Korea Herald every week since 2003.

His Herald columns have frequently appeared in international media such as The Nation, the Progressive Party, USA, the China Post, the AsiaOne, the Pakistan Observer, the Star, Yahoo! News, the Asian Views, The Straits Times, The Kathmandu Post, The Statesman, The World Weekly and others. He was also appointed co-editor of Korea Journal published by the Korean National Commission for UNESO for 2015–2016. In 2017 Kim was asked by the New York Times to write a column for the editorial/opinion page.

Kim was designated dean of international affairs at Seoul National University, a Research Member of the South Korea's Presidential Council on National Cohesion, and chairman of the Korean Culture Overseas Promotion Council in the Ministry of Culture. Actively engaged in promoting Korean literature overseas, Kim was vice president of the Seoul Literary Society which consisted of foreign ambassadors and high-ranking diplomats stationed in Seoul (2012–2017) and is a member of the advisory committee on Korean literature of White Pine Press in New York. Kim is also honorary president of the State University of New York at Buffalo Alumni Association's South Korea chapter.

In addition, Kim received the CU Distinguished Alumnus Award (2009), the Fulbright Distinguished Alumnus Award (2010), and the SUNY/Buffalo International Distinguished Alumni Award (2012).

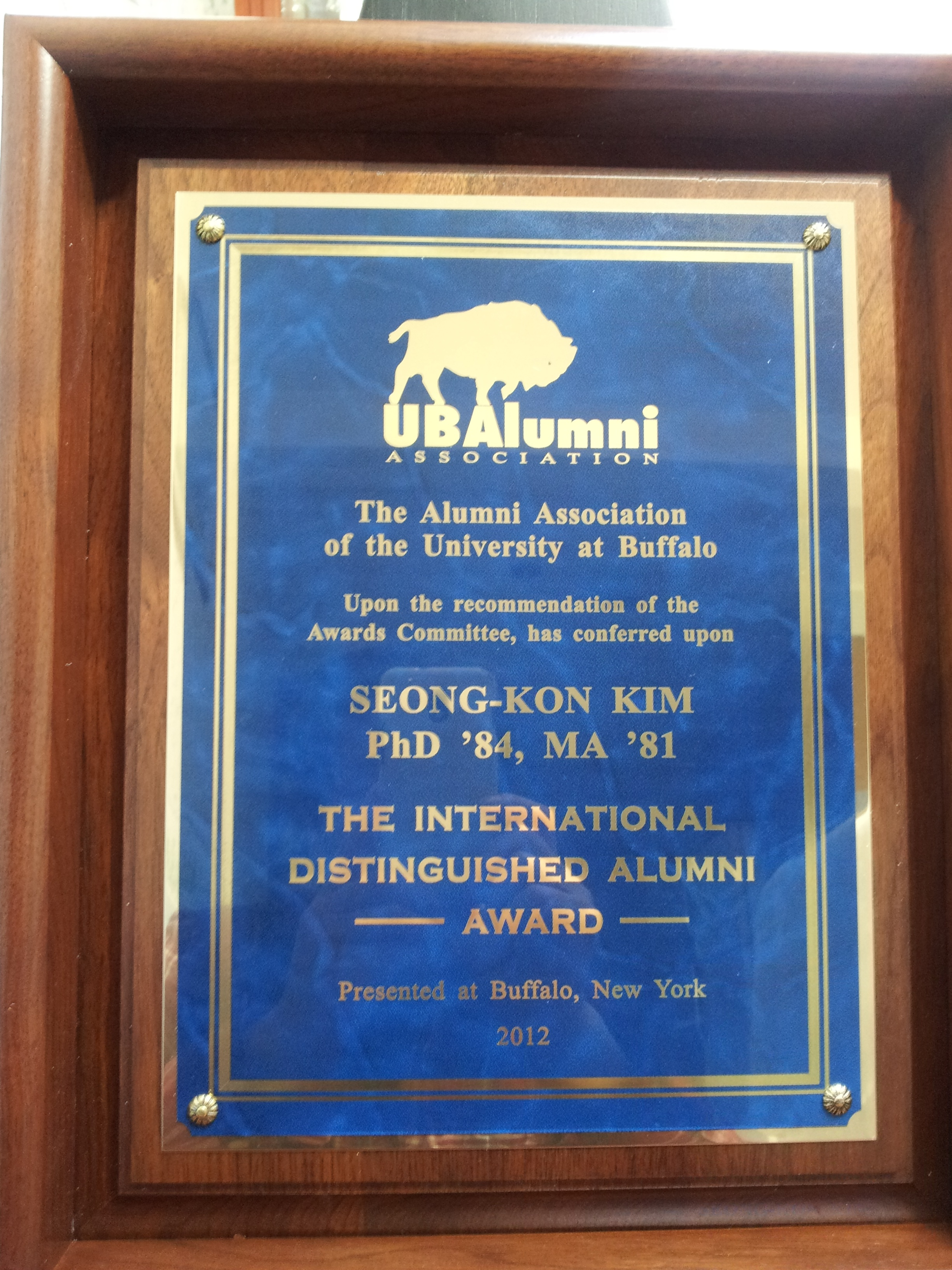
[IMG_04] In 2012, Kim received the Distinguished International Alumni Award from SUNY/Buffalo

Kim has also been featured regularly on the covers and in special editions of prestigious literary journals. In 2016, for example, "Writer’s World" featured a special edition on Kim in the winter issue and "Literature & Thought," too, published a special edition on Kim in the August issue. In 2019, Kim also appeared on the cover of the December issue of "Literature & Thought."

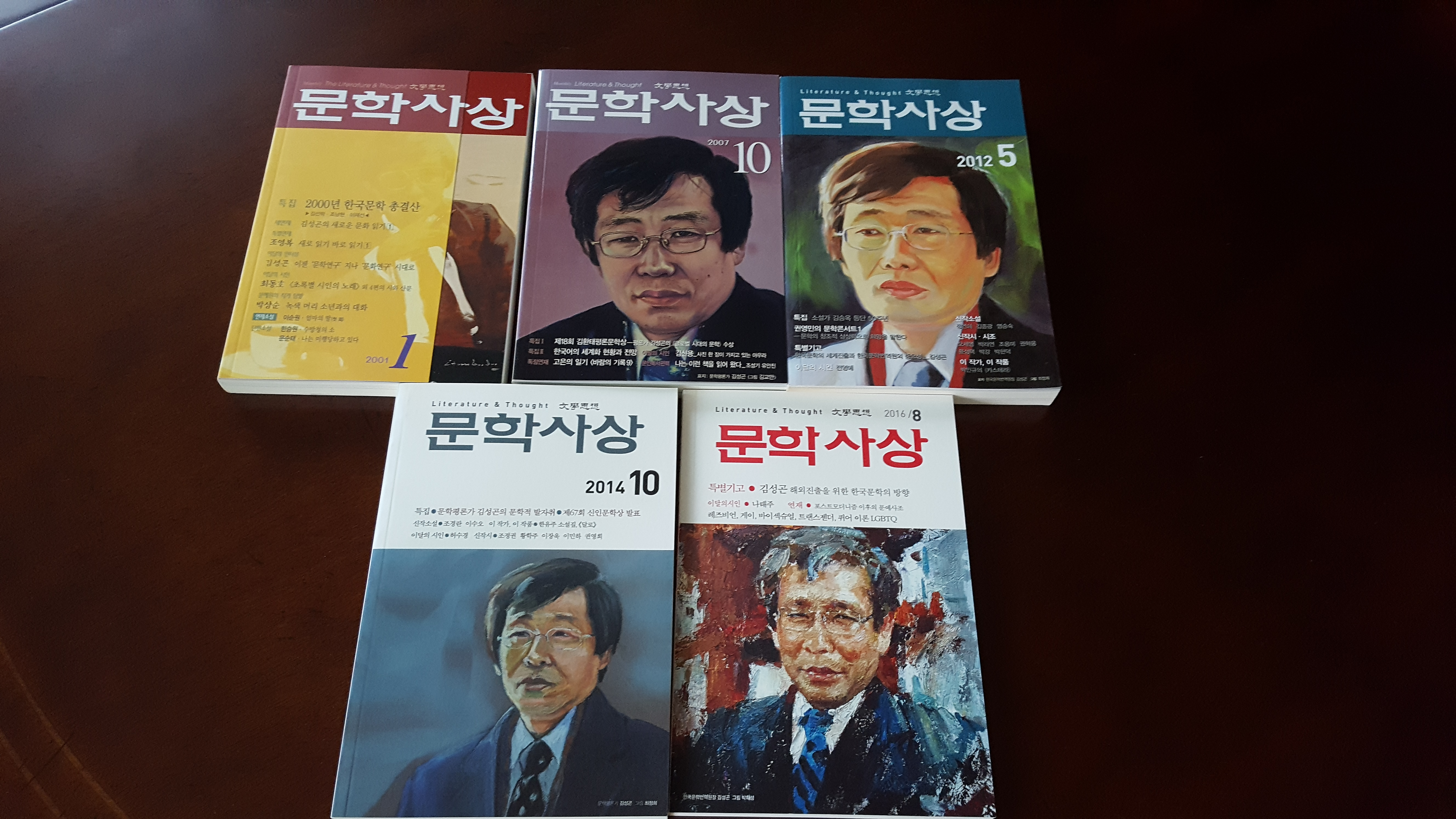
[IMG_05] Literature & Thought published a special edition on Kim six times.

Recently, his name entered the Hall of Fame of the Seoul National University Foundation. In 2015, Kim received the Distinguished Teaching Professor Award from the Central Government Officials’ Training Institute in the Ministry of Interior and his name entered the Hall of Fame in 2018. In 2022, his name also entered the Hall of Fame of the College of the Humanities, Seoul National University.

In 2015 Kim was appointed as the speaker of two prestigious lectures: the KRF (Korea Research Foundation) Distinguished Professor Lecture and the NAVER Cultural Foundation Lecture. In the same year, Kim was also selected as one of “the 50 Representative Literary Critics of Korea since 1900” by the Association of Korean Literary Critics. In 2016, Kim was appointed as chairman of the Asia Culture Forum and a member of the Korea-China Cultural Exchange Council by the Ministry of Culture, Sports, and Tourism. In the same year, he was appointed as a part-time visiting professor at the National Human Resources Institute in the Ministry of Personnel Management. In 2016, Kim was awarded the Plaque of Distinguished Accomplishment on behalf of LTI Korea from the Management Assessment Team of the Ministry of Culture, Sports and Tourism. In 2017, Kim was appointed as head judge of the prestigious Ho-am Prize Selection Committee, a Korean version of the Nobel Prize, and also the Segye Ilbo Literary Prize. Presently, he is chairman of the jury for the Pak Kyongni Prize.

=== Professional career ===
He was chairman of the board of trustees at LTI Korea. In February 2015 Kim was reappointed president of LTI Korea by the Korean government to lead the institution for another three years. Kim is also former dean and professor emeritus at Seoul National University where he was selected for the Distinguished Professor for Research Award seven times. In 2016, Kim was appointed as an undersecretary level member of the Public Diplomacy Council in the Ministry of Foreign Affairs.

Kim was editor of the prestigious literary quarterly, Contemporary World Literature (1988–1988), and editor-in-chief of the celebrated monthly literary magazine, Literature and Thought (2002–2005), and co-editor of 21st Century Literature together with the late Yi Chong-jun, Kim Yun-shik, Yoon Hu-myong and Kim Jong-hoe (1998–2012).

As vice chair of the Seoul International Forum for Literature in 2000, 2005, and 2011, Kim worked with the eminent scholar and literary critic Kim Uchang and together brought a host of celebrated international writers to Seoul, including Pierre Bourdieu, Jean Baudrillard, Le Clezio, Orhan Pamuk, Oe Kenzaburo, Gary Snyder, Robert Coover, Robert Hass, Margaret Drabble, Gao Xingjian, Bei Dao and others.

A self-appointed cultural diplomat, Kim taught South Korean diplomats at the Institute of Foreign Affairs and National Security (1988–1994), and gave lectures extensively on Korean culture and society for foreign diplomats at the KOICA (Korea International Cooperation Agency) and at the COTI (Central Officials Training Institute) in the Ministry of Foreign Affairs (1997–present).

=== Administrative positions ===
- President, LTI Korea Translation Academy, 2012–2017
- Publisher, LTI Korea Press, 2012–2017
- Publisher, Korean Literature Now, 2012–2017
- Director, Seoul National University Press, 2009–2011
- Dean, SNU Language School, Seoul National University, 2001–2005
- Director, American Studies Institute, Seoul National University, 1999–2001
- Director, SNU Student Residence Hall

=== Overseas teaching and research career ===
- Dartmouth College, Visiting Scholar, 2020-2025
- University of California, Irvine, Visiting Professor, 2019
- Universidad de Malaga, Spain, Profesor Visitante/ Universidad Docente e Investigador, 2018–2019
- Dean's Distinguished Visiting Professor, George Washington University, 2018–2018
- Visiting professor, SUNY/Buffalo, 2011–2012
- Visiting professor, Univ. of California, Berkeley, 2006–2006 Taught Asian Literature
- Visiting professor, Brigham Young University, 1996–1997 Taught Korean Literature
- Visiting professor, Pennsylvania State Univ. Fulbright Asian Scholar-in-Residence, 1990–1991 Taught English & Comp. Lit
- Visiting scholar (associate), Harvard University Yenching Institute, 2006–2007
- Visiting fellow, Rockefellow Center, State University of New York at Buffalo, 1992
- Visiting scholar, Oxford University, 1991
- Visiting scholar, University of Toronto, 1991

== Awards and honors ==
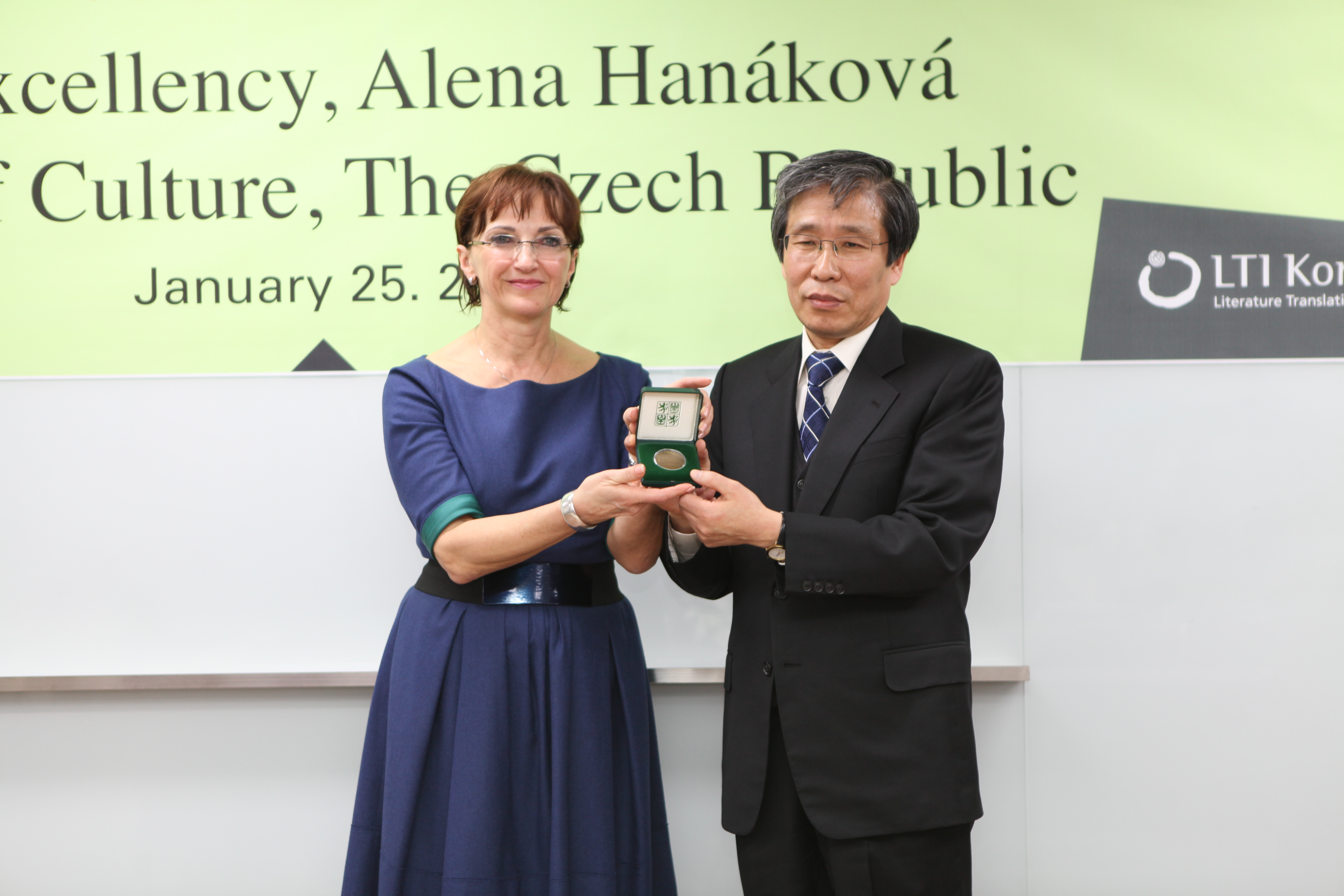
[IMG_06] Kim received a medal from H.E. Alena Hanáková, Minister of Culture of the Czech Republic on January 25, 2013

- La Orden del Merito Civil (Cruz de Oficial), Spain, 2018
- Order of the Jade (for Distinguished Service), South Korea, 2014
- Medal of Cultural Diplomacy, The Czech Republic, 2013 [IMG_06]
- Distinguished Teaching Professor Award, Central, Officials Training Institute, 2014
- Best Public Institution Director Award, Ministry of Culture, 2013
- SUNY International Distinguished Alumni Award, 2012.
- Hall of Fame: Seoul National University Development Foundation, 2012
- Hall of Fame: National Human Resources Development Institute, Ministry of Personnel Management, 2018
- Hall of Fame: Seoul National University, College of Humanities, 2022
- SNU Distinguished Research Award, (7 times), 1998, 1999, 2007, 2008, 2009, 2010, 2011
- Fulbright Distinguished Alumnus Award, 2010
- CU Distinguished Alumnus Award, 2009
- SNU Best Institute Director Award, 2003, 2004
- Wu Ho Humanities Award, 2014
- 50 Best Literary Critics in the 20th Century, selected, Association of Korean Literary Critics, 2014
- Best Books of 2010 awarded by the National Academy of Sciences (Literature in the Age of Hybrid Cultures)
- Kim Hwantae Literary Award for Criticism, 2008
- Today's Book Award, for Interviews with American Writers, 1985
- Books of the Year, awarded by the Ministry of Culture (3 times)
- Selected “2012 Best Literary Criticism” (“Literature and Game”)
- Selected “Best Book on Literature and Film” Essays on Film, 1992
- Representative Translator of Korea, selected, Journal of Publications, 1990
- Selected "Best Books in the 1990s" by Kyobo Essay on Film
- Selected “24 Best Books on Foreign Literature since the Liberation” Words in the Labyrinth: Interviews with American Writers, 1989
- Selected “Representative Books of the 1980s” American Literature in the Postmodern Age, 1989
- SNU President's Distinguished Service Plaque, 2001, 2011, 2014
- SNU Outstanding Service Award, 2004
- Korea Research Foundation Overseas Teaching Grant, 1996–1997
- British Council Grant, 1991 (Oxford University)
- Canadian Faculty Enrichment Grant, 1991 (University of Toronto)
- Asian Scholar-in-Residence Award, Pennsylvania State University, 1990–1991
- Fulbright Scholarship, 1978–1984
- SNU Overseas Research Grant (UC Berkeley/ Harvard)
- Superintendent Award for the Valedictorian, 1967
- Minister of Education Award, 1966

== Invited lectures ==
- Cornell University, 1990 (U.S.)
- Stanford University, 1991 (U.S.)
- Pennsylvania State University, 1990, 1991 (U.S.)
- State University of New York at Buffalo, 1992 (U.S.)
- University of Tokyo, 1999, 2002 (Japan)
- Peking University, 2003, 2010 (China)
- University of Paris XIII, 2004 (France)
- University of Saarbrucken, 2010 (Germany)
- State University of New York at Buffalo, 2011–2012 (U.S.)
- Institut National des Langues et Civilisations Orientale, 2016 (France)
- University of Warsaw, 2017 (Poland)
- George Washington University, 2018 The Kim-Renaud Lecture (U.S.)
- Ohio State University, 2018 (U.S.)
- Universidad de Malaga, 2019 (Spain)
- University of California, Irvine, 2019 (U.S.)

== Overseas publications (books) ==
- Simple Etiquette in Korea. Kent, UK: Paul Nobury (Curzon Press), 1988. Co-authored with O Young Lee (former Minister of Culture)
- Korea Briefing. Boulder: Associated University Press, 1991. (author of one chapter)
- Crosscurrents in the Literatures of Asia and the West. Newark: Associated UP, 1997. (chapter author)
- Postmodernism in Asia. Tokyo: University of Tokyo, 2003 (chapter author)
- Intellectual History of Korea. Tokyo: Cuon Press, 2014 (chapter author)

== Authored books ==
- Simple Etiquette in Korea. Kent, UK: Paul Norbury (Curzon Press), 1988. co-authored with O Young Lee, former Minister of Culture.
- Journey into the Past. Seoul: SNU Press, 1985. (in English)
- Conversations with American Writers. Seoul: Minumsa, 1986.
- American Literature in the Postmodern Age. Seoul: SNU Press, 1989.
- Postmodernism and Contemporary American Fiction, Seoul: Yoleumsa, 1990.
- Portrait of American Literature and Its Writers. Seoul: SNU Press, 1993. (Selected “Best Books of the Year,” Ministry of Culture)
- Essays on Film. Seoul: Yoleumsa, 1994. (Used as a textbook at the University of Washington, Also, a chapter is included in a high school textbook and college textbooks, 2011)
- Literature in the Age of New Media. Seoul: Minumsa, 1995.
- Literature and Film. Seoul: Minumsa, 1996.
- Contemporary American Literature. Seoul: Minumsa, 1996.
- Hollywood: A Mirror of 20th Century Culture. Seoul: Woongjin, 1996.
- Odyssey in Film. Seoul: Hyohyung, 2001.
- Korea in the Age of Multiculturalism. Seoul: Yoleumsa, 2002.
- Reading Culture in the Age of Fusion Culture. Seoul: L&T, 2003.
- Cultural Studies and the Future of the Humanities. Seoul: SNU Press, 2003. Selected “Best Books of the Year,” Ministry of Culture
- Reading Culture in Film. Seoul: SNU Press, 2003.
- Reading America in Hollywood Film. Seoul: Sallim, 2005.
- Edgar Allan Poe. Seoul: Sallim, 2005
- J. D. Salinger and The Catcher in the Rye. Seoul: Sallim, 2005.
- The Key to Thought: Literature. Seoul: Mountain Press, 2006.
- Literature in the Globalizing Word. Seoul: Minumsa, 2006 Best Books of the Year by the Ministry of Culture
- Literature in the Age of Hybrid Cultures. Seoul: SNU Press, 2009. Selected as the Best Books of 2010 Award by the National Academy of Sciences
- Literature Across Boundaries, Seoul: Minumsa, 2013
- Collected Works of Kim-Seong-Kon, Seoul: Knowledge, 2015
- Reading American Culture and Society in American Literature. Seoul: Dong-in, 2016
- The First Time I Encountered Cinema. Seoul: Random House Korea, 2017. Revised and enlarged edition of Essays on Film.
- Future Culture: New Literary Movements after Postmodernism. Seoul: Literature & Thought. 2017.
- Humanities across Boundaries, Seoul: Sechang Publishing Co. 2017
- Famous Scenes in Literary History: Seoul: Epiphany, 2017
- Violence and Justice, Seoul: Gimyoungsa Viche, 2019 (Co-authored with Kyung-whan Ahn)
- Reading O-young Lee: Civilization, Culture and Literature in the Age of A.I. and Life Capitalism. Seoul: Minumsa, 2023.
- My Academic Career and Life. Seoul: Seoul National University Press, 2023 (Co-authored)
- Literature Transcending Boundaries. Seoul: Nanok Press, 2026
- Literature in the Era of Artificial Intelligence. Seoul: Nanok Press, 2026

== Edited books ==
- The Death of the Novel and Postmodernism. Ed. Seong-Kon Kim. Attic Publishing Co.
- 100 Cultural Keywords in the 21st Century. Ed. Seong-Kon Kim. Research Institute of Korean Publications & Marketing
- Korean Poetry. Co-edited with Yong-jik Kim. KCAF
- Journey to Mujin: Collection of Modern Korean Fiction. Co-edited with Yongjik Kim. KCAF
- 21st Century Literary Movements. Ed. Seong-Kon Kim. Literature & Thought Publishing Co.

== Translations ==
From Korean into English:

- Strong Winds at Mishi Pass. New York: White Pine Press, 2003. Poems of Hwang Tong-kyu, Co-trans. Seong-Kon Kim, Dennis Maloney
- Woman on the Terrace. New York: White Pine Press, 2007.

Poems of Moon Chung-hee. Co-trans. Seong-Kon Kim. Alec Gordon
With this book, Poetess Moon was awarded the Cicada Award in Sweden.

- The Square. A novel by Choi In-hun. Trans. Seong-Kon Kim. Urbana-Champaign: Dalkey Archive Press, 2014.

From English into Korean:

- The Crying of Lot 49. Thomas Pynchon. Seoul: Minumsa.
- The Narrative of Arthur Gordon Pym of Nantucket. Edgar Allan Poe. Golden Bough.
- Trout Fishing in America. Richard Brautig. Vichae.
- A Farewell to Arms. Ernest Hemingway. Sigongsa.
- In Our Time. Ernest Hemingway. Sigongsa
- Waiting for the End. Leslie A. Fiedler. Samsung.
- Primitivism. Michael Bell. SNU Press
- Love is a Fallacy: Collections of Postmodern Fiction. Borges et al. Woongjin.
- Selected Poems of Seamus Heaney. Seamus Heaney. Yeolumsa
- Culture and Imperialism. Edward W. Said. co-trans. Hanshin
- Postmodern Culture. Steven Corner. co-trans. Hanshin
- American Literary Criticism. Vincent Leitch. Co-trans. Hanshin.
- Mukarovsky's Poetics. Mukarovsky. Co-trans. Modern Literature Co.
