= Sam Dealey =

American journalist, media consultant, and editor

- Born: Texas, U.S.
- Status: Married
- Education: Cornell University, B.A.
- Occupation: Foreign Correspondent

Sam Dealey is an American journalist, media consultant, and the former editor of The Washington Times. He is currently managing principal at Monument Communications, a media fellow at the Hoover Institution, and a board member at The American Spectator.

== Early life and education ==
A native of Dallas, Dealey graduated from St. Mark's School of Texas in 1992. He attended Cornell University, where he became interested in journalism. During his sophomore year, he worked at the National Journalism Center in Washington, D.C. and for political columnist Robert Novak. While at Cornell, he also worked for National Review. After graduating, he began writing for The American Spectator, eventually becoming its managing editor. He then joined The Hill newspaper as a political reporter. In 1999, Dealey joined The Wall Street Journal as an editorial page writer and editor in Hong Kong, covering Southeast Asia, China, the Koreas, and human and religious freedoms.

Dealey is related to George Dealey, Edward Musgrove Dealey, and Robert Decherd, all of whom led the A.H. Belo media conglomerate.

== The Washington Times ==
In January 2010, Dealey was hired by The Washington Times as editor-in-chief. In November 2010, he was let go by the Times after a change of ownership. He was a partner at the public relations and lobbying firm, Qorvis, before taking his position at Monument Communications.

== Awards ==
- Henry R. Luce Award for Deadline Reporting (TIME Magazine)
