= Tom Knott =

American journalist

Tom Knott is a columnist for the Sports and Metro sections of The Washington Times.

== Education ==
Knott has a B.A. degree in psychology from George Mason University.

== Reception by other journalists ==
Knott is cited as an authority by other journalists, such as on PBS and the Los Angeles Times, as well as by sports researchers. Knott's journalism notably attracts critical attention from other journalists.

Brendan Nyhan, writing in Salon.com, roundly criticizes both the Washington Times and Tom Knott for its reportage of the National Education Association.

News sites such as Cleveland.com's sports blog have repeatedly attacked Knott; for example in 2009 'Starting Blocks' wrote "Washington Times columnist Tom Knott, who has a history of bashing LeBron James, got back at it in today's headline: 'Everyone's a witness to LeBron's whining.'" The article continues "But of course Knott didn't stop there."

Writing in the Huffington Post, journalist Etan Thomas rebuked Knott for attacking him as unpatriotic, and described him "because of his far right politics", as "absolutely blinded to reality", with reference to issues such as "public school system, the broken health care system, the government's lack of a response to Hurricane Katrina, an unjust war".

Dan Steinberg, writing in The Washington Post's 'D.C. Sports Bog', discusses Knott's attack on Gilbert Arenas, and defends Arenas's conduct.

Martin Austermuhle, writing on DCist, comments that "We've always been amused by Tom Knott, the Washington Times Metro columnist who on a weekly basis directs his wrath at someone or something in the District and beyond." Discussing Knott's reaction to the Washington, D.C. smoking ban, Austermuhle writes that "Knott doesn't so much take on the ban as he does the people who supported it."
