= Tod Lindberg =

American writer and political theorist

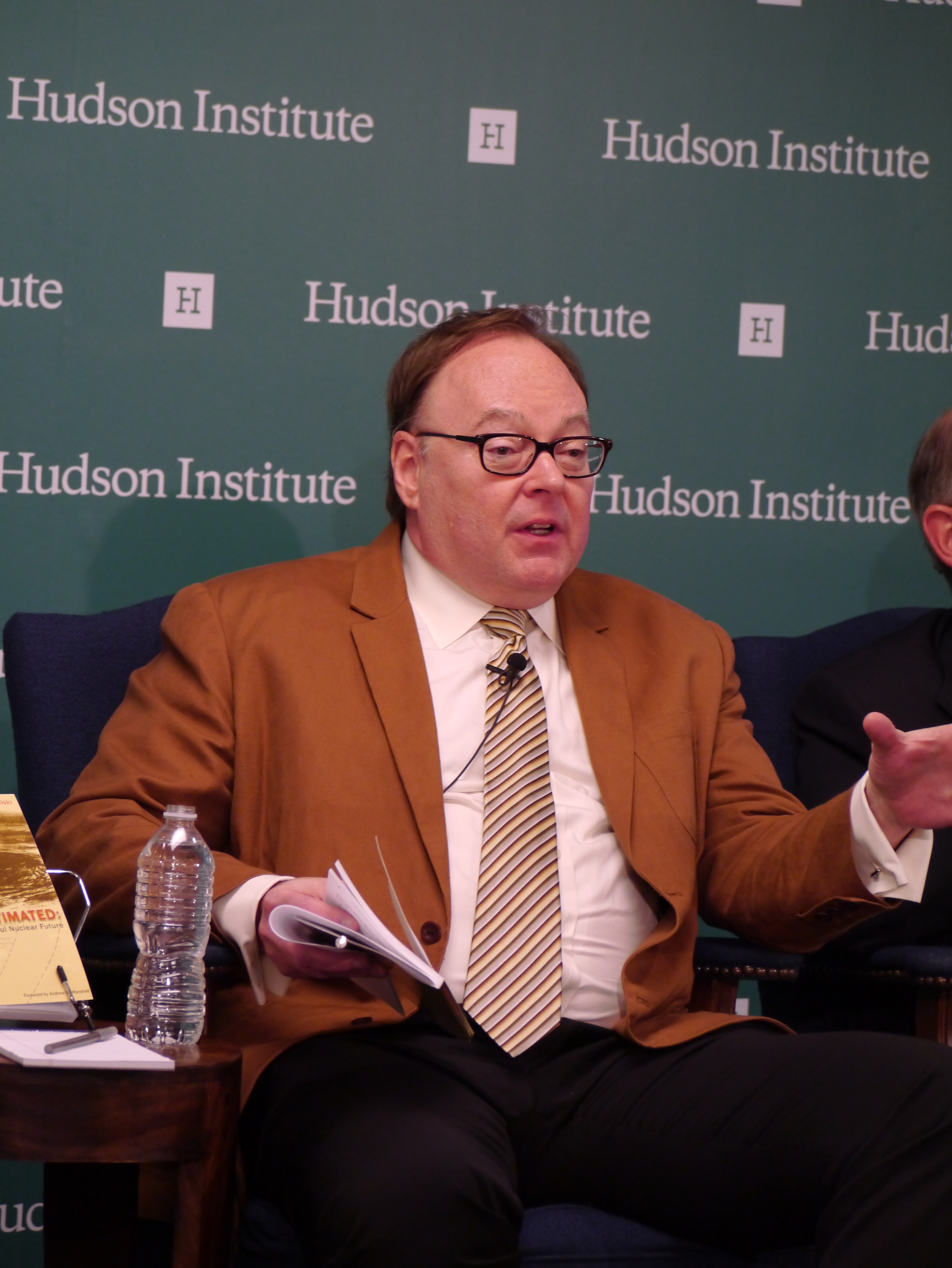
Lindberg at a 2015 panel on the future of international nuclear strategy at the Hudson Institute

Tod Lindberg is an American political expert and a current Senior Fellow at the Hudson Institute, having previously been at Stanford University's Hoover Institution. His research focuses on political theory, international relations, national security policy, and American politics. He was also the editor of Policy Review, the Hoover Institution's bimonthly journal. He is a member of the Council on Foreign Relations.

A native of Syracuse, New York, Lindberg is a 1982 honors graduate in political science of the College of the University of Chicago, where he studied political philosophy with Allan Bloom and Saul Bellow. He is also an adjunct associate professor at Georgetown University’s Walsh School of Foreign Service.

== Professional career ==
Lindberg has worked as an editor for The Washington Times and The Public Interest. In 2007 to 2008, Lindberg served as lead of the expert group on international norms and institutions of the Genocide Prevention Task Force, a joint project of the United States Holocaust Memorial Museum, the American Academy of Diplomacy, and the United States Institute of Peace. In 2005, Lindberg served as coordinator for the task group on Preventing and Responding to Genocide and Major Human Rights Abuses for the United States Institute of Peace’s Task Force on the United Nations. He was a member of the Steering Committee of the Princeton Project on National Security, for which he served as co-chair of the working group on anti-Americanism. He is a member of the Board of Visitors of the Institute on Political Journalism at Georgetown University. He was, from 2004 to 2008, a member of the U.S. National Commission on UNESCO.

He currently teaches an "Ethics and Decision Making In International Politics," both to graduate students at Georgetown University and to undergraduates at Indiana University. He also maintains an interest in philosophy and classical texts, having written books on The Political Teachings of Jesus (2007) and The Heroic Heart: Greatness Ancient and Modern (2014), along with a long poem, "The Apology of Patrocolus," published in Commentary magazine.

== Publications ==
- Beyond Paradise and Power: Europe, America, and the Future of a Troubled Partnership (Routledge, 2004) ISBN 978-0-415-95050-3
- Bridging the Foreign Policy Divide (Routledge, 2007) ISBN 0-415-96227-7
- Means to an End: U.S. Interest in the International Criminal Court (Brookings Press, 2009) ISBN 0-8157-0325-2
- The Political Teachings of Jesus (HarperCollins, 2007) ISBN 0-06-089863-1
- The Heroic Heart: Greatness Ancient and Modern (Encounter Books, 2014) ISBN 1594038236
