= Tōji =

Tōji may refer to:

- Tō-ji, a temple in Kyoto, Japan
  - Tōji Station, a railway station on the Kintetsu Kyoto Line in Minami-ku, Kyoto, Japan that gives access to the temple
- Dongzhi (solar term) in pīnyīn (Tōji in rōmaji), is the 22nd solar term in the traditional East Asian calendar
- The job title of a Japanese sake brewer
- Toji Suzuhara, a fictional character from the anime Neon Genesis Evangelion
- Touji Sakata, a fictional character from the fighting game Fatal Fury

== See also ==
- Toji (disambiguation)
