= Policy Review =

American conservative journal (1977–2013)

- Policy Review cover for October–November 2005
- Discipline: Politics and Public administration
- Language: English
- Edited by: Tod Lindberg

Publication details
- History: 1977–2013
- Publisher: Hoover Institution (United States)
- Frequency: Bimonthly

Standard abbreviations
- ISO 4: Policy Rev.

Indexing
- ISSN: 0146-5945

Links
- Journal homepage

Policy Review was a conservative journal published between 1977 and 2013.

Policy Review was founded in 1977 by The Heritage Foundation and served as the foundation's flagship publication for 36 years, until 2001.

In 2001, the publication was acquired by the Stanford University-based Hoover Institution. Its office was on Washington, D.C.'s Dupont Circle. Following the February–March 2013 issue, the Hoover Institution ceased publication of Policy Review.

== Editors ==
- Adam Meyerson
- Tucker Carlson
- Dinesh D'Souza
- Michael Johns
- Tod Lindberg

== Contributing authors ==
- Spencer Abraham
- Elliott Abrams
- George Allen
- Dick Armey
- Peter Berkowitz
- John Bolton
- William F. Buckley Jr.
- Tom Clancy
- Robert Cooper
- Bob Dole
- Daniel W. Drezner
- Mary Eberstadt
- David R. Henderson
- Toomas Hendrik Ilves
- Robert Kagan
- Ivan Krastev
- Daniel Pipes
- Jonas Savimbi
- Kori Schake
- Peter Thiel
- Justin Vaïsse
- Kurt Volker
