= Morton Kaplan =

American political scientist

Morton A. Kaplan (May 9, 1921 – September 26, 2017) was an American political scientist who was Distinguished Service Professor of Political Science, emeritus, at the University of Chicago. He was also President of the Professors World Peace Academy International; and Editor of the World&I magazine from its founding in 1986 until 2004.

== Early life and education ==
He attended Temple University and Stanford University, and received his Ph.D. from Columbia University in 1951. He has held fellowships from the Center of International Studies at Princeton University and from the Center for Advanced Study in the Behavioral Sciences. He was also a Carnegie Traveling Fellow.

== Academic career ==
His many books include Science, Language and the Human Condition, Law in a Democratic Society, and System and Process in International Politics (1957), a seminal work in the scientific study of international relations.

Kaplan introduced a new analytical tool to the study of international relations, systems analysis. His view contrasts with that of John Rawls - that it might be possible to isolate some basic social and political rules; rather Kaplan's alternative theory of justice is his test in principle, a kind of decision procedure for evaluating social, political, and moral choices, which attempts to circumvent the limitations of an egocentric or culturally narrow perspective while providing sufficient context to make a judgment. Kaplan used systems analysis to differentiate among the various types of international state systems: the "balance of power" system, the loose bipolar system, the tight bipolar system, the universal international system, the hierarchical international system, and the Unit Veto International System. Kenneth E. Boulding and Charles Kindleberger gave Kaplan's System and Process in International Politics negative reviews. Kindleberger argued that the book was a "must" read and that the primary contribution of the book was Kaplan's discussion of the international system and balance of power, but he argued that Kaplan's work did not lend itself to empirical testing, and that the application of game theory to politics and conflict was problematic.

He co-authored The Political Foundations of International Law with Nicholas deB. Katzenbach in 1961 where they write,

To understand the substance and limits of such constraining rules (international law), it is necessary to examine the interests which support them in the international system, the means by which they are made effective, and the functions they perform. Only in this way is it possible to predict the areas in which rules operate, the limits of rules as effective constraints, and the factors which underlie normative change.

He was a critic of communism and of the policies of the Soviet Union. In 1979 he edited The Many Faces of Communism.
