= Toji, the Land =

2004 South Korean television drama series

- Hangul: 토지
- RR: Toji
- MR: T'oji
- Genre: Drama
- Created by: SBS
- Based on: Toji by Park Kyong-ni
- Written by: Kim Myeong-ho; JLee Hong-goo; Lee Hye-seon
- Directed by: Lee Jong-han
- Starring: Kim Hyun-joo; Yoo Jun-sang
- Country of origin: South Korea
- Original language: Korean
- No. of episodes: 52

Production
- Executive producer: Lim Byung-hoon
- Producers: Kim Ye-ji; Park Woo-ram; Lee Hyeong-hoon; Kim Jae-geum
- Running time: 60 minutes
- Production company: Jeongin Production
- Budget: ₩150 billion

Original release
- Network: SBS TV
- Release: November 26, 2004 – May 22, 2005

Related
- Toji

Toji, the Land (Korean: 토지) is a 2004 South Korean television series based on the novel Toji, which was written by Pak Kyongni. The series following the story of turbulent life of Choi Seo-hee as she lives throughout the Donghak Peasant Revolution, the Eulmi Incident, the Japanese colonial era, and Korea's independence in 1945. As in the novel, the drama portrays the conflicts between individuals who are engulfed in their own desires of love and veiled enmity, rage and jealousy. Starring Kim Hyun-joo, Yoo Jun-sang, it premiered on SBS on November 26, 2004, and aired on Friday and Saturday at time-slot 20:45-21:45 (KST) till May 22, 2005.

== Plot ==
When she was 5 years old, Seo Hee(Kim Hyun-joo)'s mother left with one of the servants, leaving her behind her father, who had never treated her well. The first shock was a preparation for her hardship. After her father was killed, her relative Joon Goo, taking advantage of her young age to gain possession of the land she rightfully owns. In these miserable years, her low status friend, Kim Gil-sang (Yoo Jun-sang) became her only support. He helped Seo Hee to run away from hometown to escape Joon Goo's plot forced Seo Hee to marry a disabled man. Then, she slowly builds her property as a merchant, driven by a desire to revenge Joon Goo and the ultimate goal is to regain the land.

== Cast ==
=== Main ===
- Kim Hyun-joo as Choi Seo-hee
  - Bae Na-yeon as child Seo-hee
  - Shin Se-kyung as young Seo-hee
- Yoo Jun-sang as Kim Gil-sang
  - Seo Ji-won as child Gil-sang
  - Kim Ji-hoon as young Gil-sang
- Lee Jae-eun as Bong-soon/Ki-hwa
  - Kim Han-bi as child Bong-soon/Ki-hwa
  - Hahm Eun-jung as young Bong-soon/Ki-hwa
- Jung Chan as Lee Sang-hyun
  - Jeong Se-in as young Sang-hyun
- Hae Hae-jin as Kim Pyeong-san/Kim Doo-su
  - Kim Hoon-gi as young Pyeong-san/Doo-su

=== People of Choi Cham-pan ===
- Kim Mi-sook as Yoon's wife
- Park Ji-il as Choi Chi-soo/Choi Cham-pan
- Kim Yu-seok as Kim Hwan/Gu-cheon
- Lee Min-young as Byeol-dang
- Kim Kap-soo as Jo Jun-goo
- Do Ji-won as Hong's wife
- Jo An as Gwi-nyeo
- Park Hye-sook as Bong Sun-ne
- Kim Young-ok as Gan-nan's Grandmother
- Son Chang-joon as Jo Byeong-soo
  - Baek Seung-woo as young Byeong-soo
- Lee Won-jong as Kim Seo-bang
- Kim Ji-young as Kim Seo-bang's wife
- Hwang Bo-ra as Yeon-i
- Park Young-seo as Gae-dong
- Bae Min-hui as Ma Chi-yeog
- Choi Seong-ho as Sam-su
- Baek Seung-wook as Do-li

=== Pyeongsari people ===
- Park Sang-won as Lee Yong
- Kim Yeo-jin as Kang Cheong-daek
- Park Ji-young as Im In-ne
- Kim Hye-sun as Gong Wol-seun
- Yang Geum-seok as Ha Man-daek
- Jeong Jong-jun as Kang Po-su
- Bae Do-hwan as Lee Chil-seong
- Lee Won-jae as Kim I-pyung
- Jung Kyung-soon as Pyeong Sa-ri's widow
- Park Yong-soo as Kim Young-pal
- Lee Soon-jae as Kim Hoon-jang
- Choi Gyu-hwan as Kim Doo-man
- Kwon Jae-hwan as Kim Han-bok
  - Won Jang-hee as young Han-bok

=== People of Seohee's house ===
- Oh Tae-kyung as Choi Yoon-guk
  - Won Deok-hyeon as child Yoon-guk
- Jang Hee-jin as Lee Yang-hyeon
  - Kim Ye-won as child Yang-hyeon
- Lee Joo-seok as Choi Hwan-guk
  - Kim Seung-wook as child Hwan-guk
  - Kim Seok as young Hwan-guk
- Park Mi-young as Hwang Deok-hee
- Shin Sung-woon as Butler Jang Yeon-hak
- Kim So-hyun as Sae-chim

=== Independence activists ===
- Park Si-eun as Yoo In-shil
- Kim Ji-wan as Jiro Ogada
- Park Jin-hyung as Jeong-seok

=== People from Im Myeong-hee's side ===
- Jung Ha-na as Im Myeong-hee
- Lee Chang as Jo Chan-ha
- Kim Il-woo as Jo Yong-ha
- Kim Mi-ra as No Ri-ko
- Kim Hee-jun as Im Myeong-bin

=== Yongjeong ===
- Oh Yoon-hong as Ok-ne
- Kwon Soo-hyun as Ok-i
- Lee Jung-gil as Gong No-myeon
- Kim Seon-young as Bang's wife
- Yeom Hyeon-hee as Gong Song-ae
- Ha Da-som as Shim Geum-nyeo

=== Others ===
- Go Joo-won as Song Young-kwang
- Ahn Joo-hee as Kang Hye-sook
- Jung Wook as Lee Hong
  - Oh Seung-yoon as young Hong
- Lee Kyung-wha as Heo Bo-yeon
- Lee Eon-jeong as Jang-yi
- Jeon Hyun-ah as Lee Im
- Lee Young-ah as Lee Sang-sang
- Park Sang-gyu as Lee Dong-jin
- Park Jin-seong as Song Gwan-soo
- Kwak Jung-wook as Kang Doo-me
- Lee Seung-hyung as Hwang Tae-soo
- Im Seo-yeon as Doo-ri
- Bae Min-hee as Sam-wol
- Min Wook
- Shin Goo as Doctor Moon
- Lee Seung-cheol as Kim Gae-joo
- Lim Il-gyu as Kang Doo-me
- Oh A-rang
- Lee Tae-hoon as Monk Woo-gwan
- Yang Dong-jae
- Maeng Ho-rim
- Kwon Ki-seon
- Kwon Kyung-ha
- Kwon Bok-soon
- Kim Shin-rok as Han-bok's wife
- Kim Hwa-ran
- Jeong Jong-hoon as Master Hye-kwan
- Kim Hak-yong
- Jo Jung-guk as Yong-chil
- Kim Soon-yi
- Park Yoon-jung

== Production ==
=== Casting ===
In 2003, SBS confirmed Kim Hyun-joo was chosen as the main role of Choi Seo-hee

=== Development ===
In October 2003, the drama started filming in Hadong.

The production cost 15 billion won. New setting for the drama were built in Hadong, South Gyeongsang Province and Hoengseong, Gangwon Province, South Korea. In Hadong, about 40 houses were built centered on Choi Champandaek, which now become a tourist attraction. And about 80 houses were built in Hoengseong, which contains realistic scenes of Yongjeong, Hoeryong and Jinju, as well as Harbin, China and Japan during the Japanese colonial period.

=== Note ===
This 2004 version drama was the first drama produced after the novel Toji was completed, has been evaluated to have fully captured the thoughts and thoughts of writer Park Kyongni.

== Broadcasting changes and extension ==
- The broadcast of episode scheduled on December 19, 2004, was cancelled due to the friendly football match Korea vs Germany.

== Awards and nominations ==
Award	Year	Category	Nominee	Result	Ref.
SBS Drama Awards	2005	Best Drama	Land	Won	
SBS Drama Awards	2005	Excellence Award, Actor in a Serial Drama	Yoo Jun-sang	Won	
SBS Drama Awards	2005	Best Actor in a Serial Drama	Lee Soon-jae	Won	
SBS Drama Awards	2005	Top Excellence Award, Actress	Kim Hyun-joo	Nominated	
SBS Drama Awards	2005	Excellence Award, Actress in Serial Drama	Kim Hyun-joo	Nominated	
SBS Drama Awards	2005	Netizen Popularity Award	Kim Hyun-joo	Won	
SBS Drama Awards	2005	Top 10 Star Award	Kim Hyun-joo	Won	
SBS Drama Awards	2005	Best Supporting Actor	Kim Kap-soo	Won	
SBS Drama Awards	2005	New Star Award	Jo An	Won	
SBS Drama Awards	2005	Child Actor Award	Bae Na-yeon	Won	
SBS Drama Awards	2005	Child Actor Award	Hahm Eun-Jung	Won	
32nd Korea Broadcasting Awards	2005	Best Producer	Lee Jong-han	Won	
42nd Baeksang Arts Awards	2006	Best Drama	Land	Won	
42nd Baeksang Arts Awards	2006	Best Director (TV)	Lee Jong-han	Nominated	
42nd Baeksang Arts Awards	2006	Best Actress (TV)	Kim Hyun-joo	Nominated	
Seoul International Drama Awards	2006	Best TV Picture	Land	Won	
