= Tiempos del Mundo =

Newspaper

Tiempos del Mundo was a Spanish-language print newspaper that started publication in Washington, D.C., in 1996 by News World Communications, an international news media corporation owned at the time by the Unification Church of Sun Myung Moon.

Tiempos del mundo was published simultaneously in Argentina, Bolivia, Chile, Colombia, Costa Rica, Dominican Republic, Ecuador, Guatemala, Honduras, Mexico, Nicaragua, Panama, Paraguay, Peru, Uruguay and Venezuela.

The publications merged to form an online publication Tiempos del Mundo. The online website was then eventually merged with UPI.com, the website of United Press International.
