= The Land (1974 film) =

- Theatrical poster for The Land (1974)
- Hangul: 토지
- Hanja: 土地
- RR: Toji
- MR: T'oji
- Directed by: Kim Soo-yong
- Screenplay by: Lee Hyung-woo
- Based on: Toji by Park Kyung-ni
- Produced by: Kim Yong-deok
- Starring: Kim Ji-mee
- Cinematography: Jang Seok-jun
- Edited by: Ree Kyoung-ja
- Music by: Jeong Yoon-joo
- Distributed by: Woo Sung Enterprises Co., Ltd
- Release date: November 23, 1974
- Running time: 130 minutes
- Country: South Korea
- Language: Korean

The Land (Korean: 토지) is a 1974 South Korean drama film directed by Kim Soo-yong. It was chosen as Best Film at the Grand Bell Awards.

== Plot ==
Based on a novel of the same name by Park Kyung-ni, the film chronicles the lives of a wealthy land-owning family during the rule of Gojong.

== Cast ==
- Kim Ji-mee
- Lee Soon-jae
- Heo Jang-kang
- Kim Hee-ra
- Hwang Hae
- Choi Nam-Hyun
- Choe Jeong-min
- Woo Yeon-jeong
- Yeo Su-jin
- Do Kum-bong

== Bibliography ==
- "TOJI". The Complete Index to World Film. Archived from the original on 2012-04-06.
- 토지. Cine21 (in Korean).

== Notes ==
Preceded by The General in Red Robes	Grand Bell Awards for Best Film; 1974	Succeeded by Flame
