= Tudi, Iran =

Tudi تودی
- Village
- Location within Iran
- Coordinates: 28°31′46″N 61°16′41″E
- Country: Iran
- Province: Sistan and Baluchestan
- County: Khash
- Bakhsh: Central
- Rural District: Sangan

Population (2006)
  - Total: 70
- Time zone: UTC+3:30 (IRST)
  - Summer (DST): UTC+4:30 (IRDT)

Tudi (Persian: تودی, also Romanized as Tūdī and Ţūdī) is a village in Sangan Rural District, in the Central District of Khash County, Sistan and Baluchestan province, Iran. At the 2006 census, its population was 70, in 20 families.
