= Ong Dia =

Vietnamese earth deity

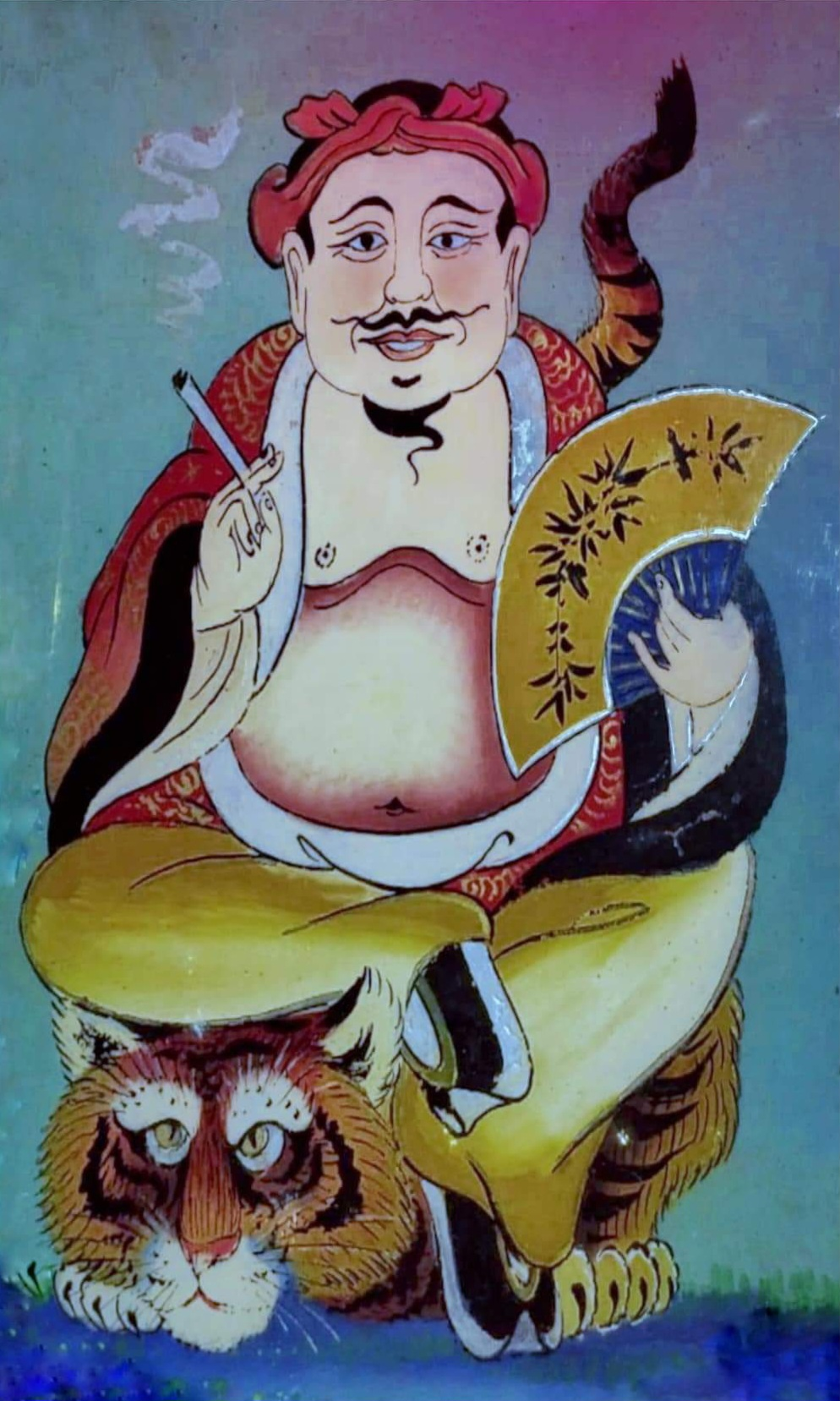
Ông Địa in Southern Vietnamese glass paintings

Ong Dia (Vietnamese: Ông Địa; Hán-Nôm: 翁地), Thổ Địa (土地), Thổ Công (土公) or Thần Đất (神坦), is the god of the earth and patron of the land on which the houses is built. He is one of the most commonly worshiped deities in Vietnam.
