= GolfStyles =

Golf magazine

GolfStyles (formerly the Washington Golf Monthly) is a regional golf magazine published in Fairfax, Virginia, and serving the Washington D.C. area. The magazine was started in 1994. It is also published in four other regional markets: Philadelphia, New Jersey, Ohio, and Atlanta. In early 2007, total circulation was more than 315,000 per issue.

Golfstyles bills itself as "America's best regional golf magazine" and was described as "world class" by course architect Arthur Hills. The publisher is Michael Keating, and the managing editor is Jeff Thoreson. Golf Business Wire calls it "America's best golf magazine with a regional focus."

On March 4, 2006, GolfStyles Media Group began a related radio program, "GolfStyles Live," which Golf Business Wire describes as a "hit weekly radio show." WNTP vice president/general manager Russ Whitnah acknowledges GolfStyles magazine "a recognized leader in the golf publications industry."
