= Choe Inhun =

South Korean novelist (1936–2018)

Choi In-hoon
- Born: 13 April 1936; Hoeryong, Kankyōhoku Province, Korea, Empire of Japan
- Died: 23 July 2018 (aged 82); Goyang, South Korea
- Occupations: Novelist; Poet; Playwright; Literary Critic
- Writing career
- Language: Korean

- Choe Inhun
- Hangul: 최인훈
- Hanja: 崔仁勳
- RR: Choe Inhun
- MR: Ch'oe Inhun

Choi In-hoon (Korean: 최인훈; Hanja: 崔仁勳; 13 April 1936 – 23 July 2018) was a South Korean novelist and professor of creative writing at Seoul Institute of the Arts from 1977 to 2001. He is well-known for his 1960 novel The Square, which depicts "the troubled life of a Korean prisoner of war (POW) who ends up taking his own life amid an intensified ideological rift in the post-Korean War era." He won the 2011 Park Kyong-ni Prize.

== Biography ==
Choi In-hoon was born on 13 April 1936 in Hoeryong, North Hamgyong Province, which is now in North Korea. When the Korean War broke out in 1950, he took refuge with his family to South Korea aboard a U.S. Navy landing ship. He was admitted to the college of Law at Seoul National University in 1952. He did not finish his academic work; instead, he joined the army without completing the final semester of his college studies. He served as an English interpreter and TI&E (troop information & education) officer for seven years until he was discharged in 1963. From 1977 to 2001 he served as a Professor of creative writing at Seoul Institute of the Arts.

Choi died from colorectal cancer in Goyang on 23 July 2018.

== Work ==
While still in the military, Choi made his literary debut. Most of his work centers on individuals suffering from the ideological conflicts centering on Korean national separation. He is both prolific and controversial. His most famous work is The Square, which was published in 1960 and immediately became successful.

The Square was published on the heels of the Student Revolution on April 19, 1960. This revolution overthrew President Syngman Rhee and Choi was one of the first novelists to publish in that era. Consequently, it is regarded as having been the starting point for a new era in Korea's modern literature.

The successor to The Square was A Grey Man, which also focused tightly on issues of current politics in South Korea, particularly "the political decadence that culminated in the ouster of Syngman Rhee".

== Works in translation ==
- Reflections on a Mask, Homa & Sekei Books (2002, Stephen Moore and Shi Chung Park, tr.)
- A Grey Man, Si Sa Yong O Sa Pub (1988, Chun Kyung-ja, tr.)
- The Square, Spindlewood (Sep 1985, Kevin O'Rourke, tr.)
- House of Idols, Jimoondang Publishing Company (Feb 2003, John Holstein and Chun Kyung-ja, tr.)

== Works in Korean (partial) ==
Novels

- Reflections on a Mask
- The Square (1960)
- A Dream of Nine Clouds (1962)
- A Grey Man (1963)
- Journey to the West (1966)
- The Sound of Laughter (1967)
- One Day in the Life of Kubo the Novelist (1969)
- Typhoon (1973)
- The Keyword (1994)

Plays

- Where Shall We Meet Again? (1970)
- Shoo-oo Shoo Once Upon A Time (1976)

Essays

- Meditation on the Road (1989)

== Awards ==
- 1966, Dong-in Literary Award
- 1977, Best Playwright Prize, Baeksang Arts Awards
- 1978, Meritorious Prize in the Arts Category of the JoongAng Cultural Awards
- 1979, Seoul Theater Critics Group Award
- 1994, Isan Literary Award
- 2011, Park Kyong-ni Prize
- 2004, Distinguished Alumnus Award of Seoul National University's College of Law
