= Segye Ilbo =

South Korean newspaper

- Owner: News World Communications
- Website: segye.com

Korean name
- Hangul: 세계일보
- Hanja: 世界日報
- RR: Segye ilbo
- MR: Segye ilbo

Segye Ilbo (Korean: 세계일보; Hanja: 世界日報; lit. World Daily) is a Korean-language newspaper published in South Korea. The newspaper is owned by News World Communications, which was established by the Unification Church. It is considered right-leaning and conservative.
