= Wesley Pruden =

American journalist and author (1935–2019)

- Born: James Wesley Pruden Jr. December 18, 1935; Little Rock, Arkansas, U.S.
- Died: July 17, 2019 (aged 83); Washington, D.C., U.S.
- Education: University of Arkansas at Little Rock
- Occupation: Journalist with The Washington Times
- Years active: 1956–2019
- Website: www.washingtontimes.com/opinion/pruden-on-politics/

James Wesley Pruden Jr., known as Wesley Pruden (December 18, 1935 – July 17, 2019) was an American journalist and author. He was the editor-in-chief of The Washington Times from 1992 until his retirement in 2008.

== Early life and education ==
Pruden was born on December 18, 1935, in Little Rock, Arkansas. His family lived in the state for several generations. His father, James Wesley Pruden, Sr. (1908–1979), was a Southern Baptist minister, the pastor of the Grace Baptist Church, and a radio evangelist. Some of his sermon titles are "Why I Became a Baptist After Preaching for the Nazarenes for Ten Years", "Why Every Baptist Should Get Drunk Once", and "Who's in Hell". The senior Pruden was also president of the Little Rock chapter of the White Citizens' Council, a segregationist group that opposed racial integration throughout the 1950s and 1960s.

Pruden attended Little Rock Central High School, and simultaneously, as a tenth grade student in 1951, worked nights as a copyboy at the since defunct Arkansas Gazette, where he later became a sportswriter and an assistant state editor. After high school, he attended Little Rock Junior College, which was then a two-year college, since incorporated into the University of Arkansas at Little Rock.

== Career ==
In 1956, Pruden began working at The Commercial Appeal in Memphis, Tennessee. In 1963, he joined the National Observer, a Washington, D.C.–based national weekly published by Dow Jones & Company, for which he covered national politics and the civil rights movement. In 1965, he was assigned to cover the Vietnam War, and served for a decade as a foreign correspondent in Saigon, Hong Kong, Beirut, and London. The National Observer ceased publication in 1977.

Between 1976 and 1982, Pruden worked on a novel, a satire for which he could not find a publisher.

=== The Washington Times ===
In 1982, he joined The Washington Times as chief political correspondent, four months after the newspaper's founding. The following year, in 1983, he became assistant managing editor in 1983. In 1985, he was appointed managing editor, and he was appointed editor-in-chief in 1992. He retired in January 2008, and was appointed editor-in-chief-emeritus. He continued to write a twice-weekly column on politics and national affairs for The Washington Times.

Pruden is known for his coverage of President Ronald Reagan about whom he wrote:

"When Ronald Reagan speaks, the people never hear the politician saying, 'blah blah blah.' They hear a man who talks like they do, saying things that sound like common sense. Such is the essence of the 'Reagan mystique', the aura of power that has carried the nation along with the man who is arguably the most effective president since Franklin D. Roosevelt."

In 1991, he was awarded the H.L. Mencken Prize for excellence in writing and commentary.

Every Saturday, under Pruden's editorship, The Washington Times published a full page of stories on the American Civil War, the only daily newspaper in the United States to do so. Pruden called it "probably our single most popular feature", and noted that "There are more books published on the Civil War than on any other American topic." Pruden said that "the Civil War page has just as many stories about glorifying the Union as it does the Confederacy." Soon after Pruden retired as editor-in-chief, the Times announced that the Civil War page would be expanded to include coverage of all America's wars and would be renamed "America at War."

Pruden's retirement from his position as editor-in-chief of The Washington Times in 2008 was widely seen as involuntary. Columbia Journalism Review describes him as having been "pushed out amid allegations that he allowed racism to fester in the newsroom."

On November 17, 2009, Pruden published an opinion article in The Washington Times titled "Obama bows, the nation cringes," where he set forth his thoughts on what he considered Barack Obama's breaches of etiquette committed on his tour of Asia, such as bowing to Emperor Akihito in Japan. In the article, he expressed the opinion that since President Obama was "sired by a Kenyan father, born to a mother attracted to men of the Third World, and reared by grandparents in Hawaii," he "has no natural instinct or blood impulse for what [America] is about." A number of commentators criticized the column as racist.

In 2013, Pruden returned to The Washington Times as part of a wide-ranging shakeup following the death of Sun Myung Moon, the newspaper's founder. Having him as an editor again was viewed by many as damaging to The Washington Times's reputation. Columbia Journalism Review quoted an unnamed senior Washington Times official as saying that Pruden's return was "a huge blow to the influence and credibility of the paper."

== Death ==
Pruden died at his Washington, D.C. residence on July 17, 2019, following a heart attack, at age 83.
