= News World Communications =

U.S.-based news company founded by Sun Myung Moon

- Type: News media
- Founded: 1976; 50 years ago in New York City, U.S.
- Founder: Sun Myung Moon
- Area served: Internationally
- Products: New York City Tribune; Noticias del Mundo
- Subsidiaries: GolfStyles; Segye Ilbo; Sekai Nippo; United Press International

News World Communications Inc. is an American international news media corporation.

== History ==
News World Communications was founded in New York City, in 1976, by Unification Church founder and leader Sun Myung Moon. Its first two newspapers, The News World, later renamed the New York City Tribune, and the Spanish-language Noticias del Mundo, were published in New York City from 1976 until the early 1990s.

News World Communications currently owns United Press International, GolfStyles, formerly Washington Golf Monthly, Segye Ilbo (South Korea), and Sekai Nippo (Japan). It previously owned World and I magazine, Tiempos del Mundo, Zambezi Times in South Africa, and Middle East Times in Egypt.

Until 2008, it published the Washington D.C.–based newsmagazine Insight on the News. News World Communications' best-known newspaper was The Washington Times, which the company owned from the paper's founding in 1982 until 2010, when Sun Myung Moon and a group of former Times editors purchased it from News World Communications under the company News World Media Development, which now also owns The World and I.

The Washington Times, which it founded and owned for several decades, is currently owned by a diversified conglomerate owned by the Unification Church, Operations Holdings, through The Washington Times LLC.

In October 2009, Hyun Jin Moon took over as chairman.
