= The Washington Times =

American broadsheet newspaper

- America's Newspaper

- Front page for August 22, 2016
- Type: Daily newspaper
- Format: Broadsheet
- Owner(s): Operations Holdings (via The Washington Times, LLC)
- Founder: Sun Myung Moon
- Publisher: Larry Beasley
- Editor-in-chief: Christopher Dolan
- General manager: David Dadisman
- News editor: Victor Morton
- Opinion editor: Charles Hurt
- Founded: May 17, 1982; 44 years ago
- Political alignment: Conservative
- Language: English
- Headquarters: 3600 New York Avenue NE; Washington, D.C. 20002
- Circulation: 52,059 daily (as of 2019)
- ISSN: 0732-8494
- OCLC number: 8472624
- Website: www.washingtontimes.com

The Washington Times is an American conservative daily newspaper published in Washington, D.C. It covers general interest topics with an emphasis on national politics. Its broadsheet daily edition is distributed throughout Washington, D.C. and the greater Washington metropolitan area. It also publishes a subscription-based weekly tabloid edition aimed at a national audience.

The first edition of The Washington Times was published on May 17, 1982. The newspaper was founded by Unification Church leader Sun Myung Moon, and it was owned until 2010 by News World Communications, an international media conglomerate founded by Moon. It is currently owned by Operations Holdings, which is a part of the Unification Church movement.

The Washington Times has been known for its conservative political stance, often supporting the policies of Republican presidents Ronald Reagan, George H.W. Bush, George W. Bush, and Donald Trump. During the 1990s and 2000s, The Washington Times was critical of the Democratic presidents Bill Clinton and Barack Obama, and published stories supporting neo-confederate historical revisionism. It also drew controversy by publishing conspiracy theories and racist columns by a former editor about Obama. The Washington Times has published columns contradicting scientific consensus on multiple environmental and health issues.

== History ==
=== 1980s ===
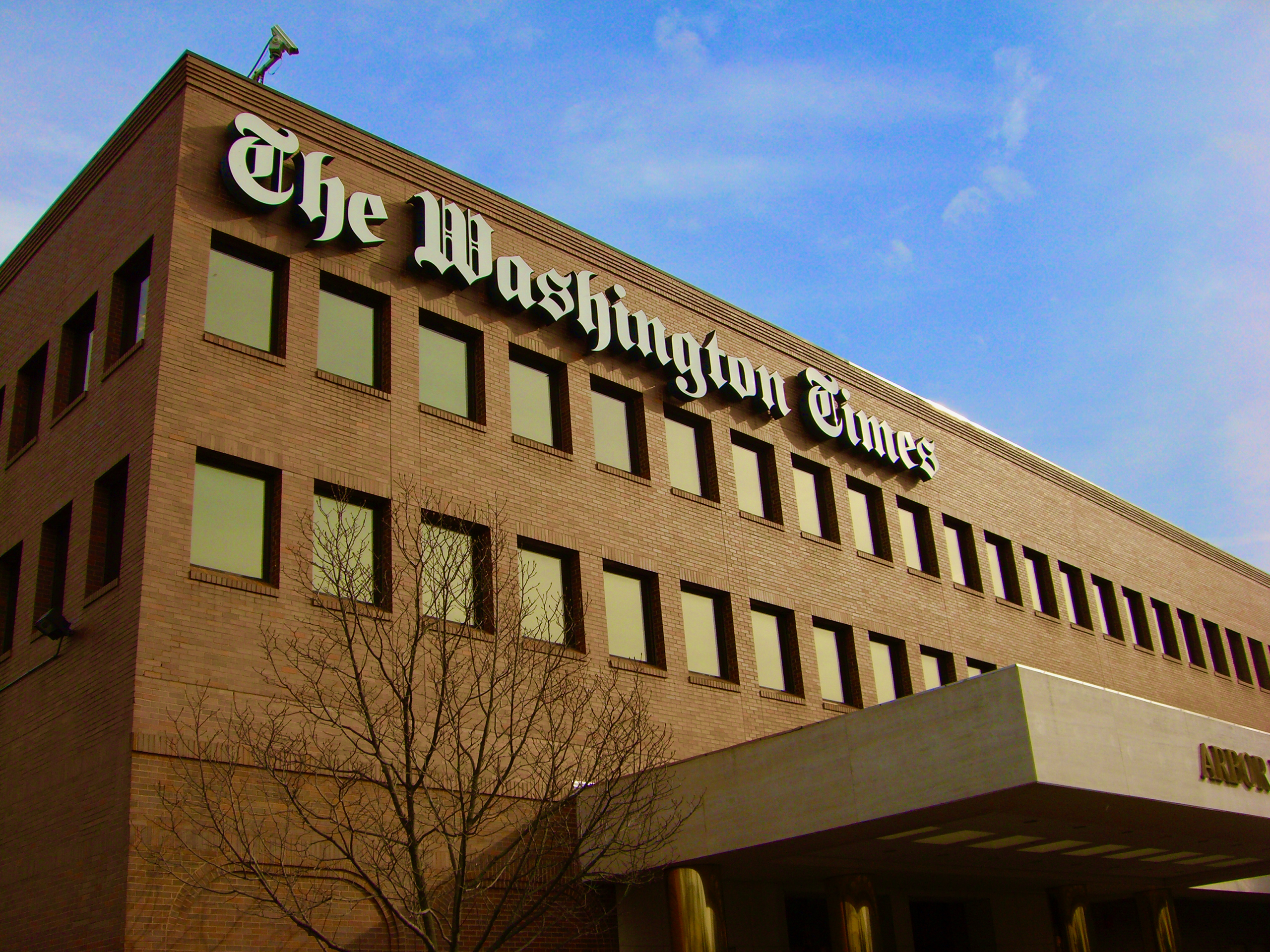
The headquarters of The Washington Times on New York Avenue NE in Washington, D.C.

The Washington Times was founded May 17, 1982, by News World Communications, a New York City-based international media conglomerate associated with the Unification Church, which also owns United Press International (UPI) and newspapers in Japan, South America, and South Korea. The Washington Times lost a great deal of money in the early years of its existence and relied on the Unification Church's income from Japan to subsidize it.

Bo Hi Pak, chief aide to Unification Church founder and leader Sun Myung Moon, was the founding president and founding chairman of the board. Moon asked Richard L. Rubenstein, a rabbi and college professor who had written on the Holocaust, to serve on the board of directors. The newspaper's first editor and publisher was James R. Whelan.

The Washington Times was founded one year after The Washington Star, a Washington, D.C. daily newspaper, went out of business, leaving the city with The Washington Post as its only daily newspaper. A large percentage of the newspaper's news staff came from the Star.

Unusual among daily newspapers when The Washington Times was founded, the newspaper published full-color front pages in all its sections and color elements throughout. It also used ink that it advertised as being less likely to come off on the reader's hands than the type used by The Washington Post. At its start, it had 125 reporters, 25 percent of whom were members of the Unification Church of the United States.

President Ronald Reagan read The Washington Times every day during his presidency. In 1997, he said: "The American people know the truth. You, my friends at The Washington Times, have told it to them. It wasn't always the popular thing to do. But you were a loud and powerful voice. Like me, you arrived in Washington at the beginning of the most momentous decade of the century. Together, we rolled up our sleeves and got to work. And—oh, yes—we won the Cold War."

After a brief editorship under Smith Hempstone, Arnaud de Borchgrave, a former UPI and Newsweek reporter, became executive editor, serving from 1985 to 1991. Borchgrave was credited with encouraging energetic reporting by staff but was known to make unorthodox journalistic decisions. During his tenure, The Washington Times mounted a fundraising drive for Contra rebels in Nicaragua and offered rewards for information leading to the arrest of Nazi war criminals.

From 1985 to 2008, News World published a weekly news magazine called Insight on the News, also called just Insight, as a companion to The Washington Times. Insight's reporting sometimes resulted in journalistic controversy.

=== 1990s ===
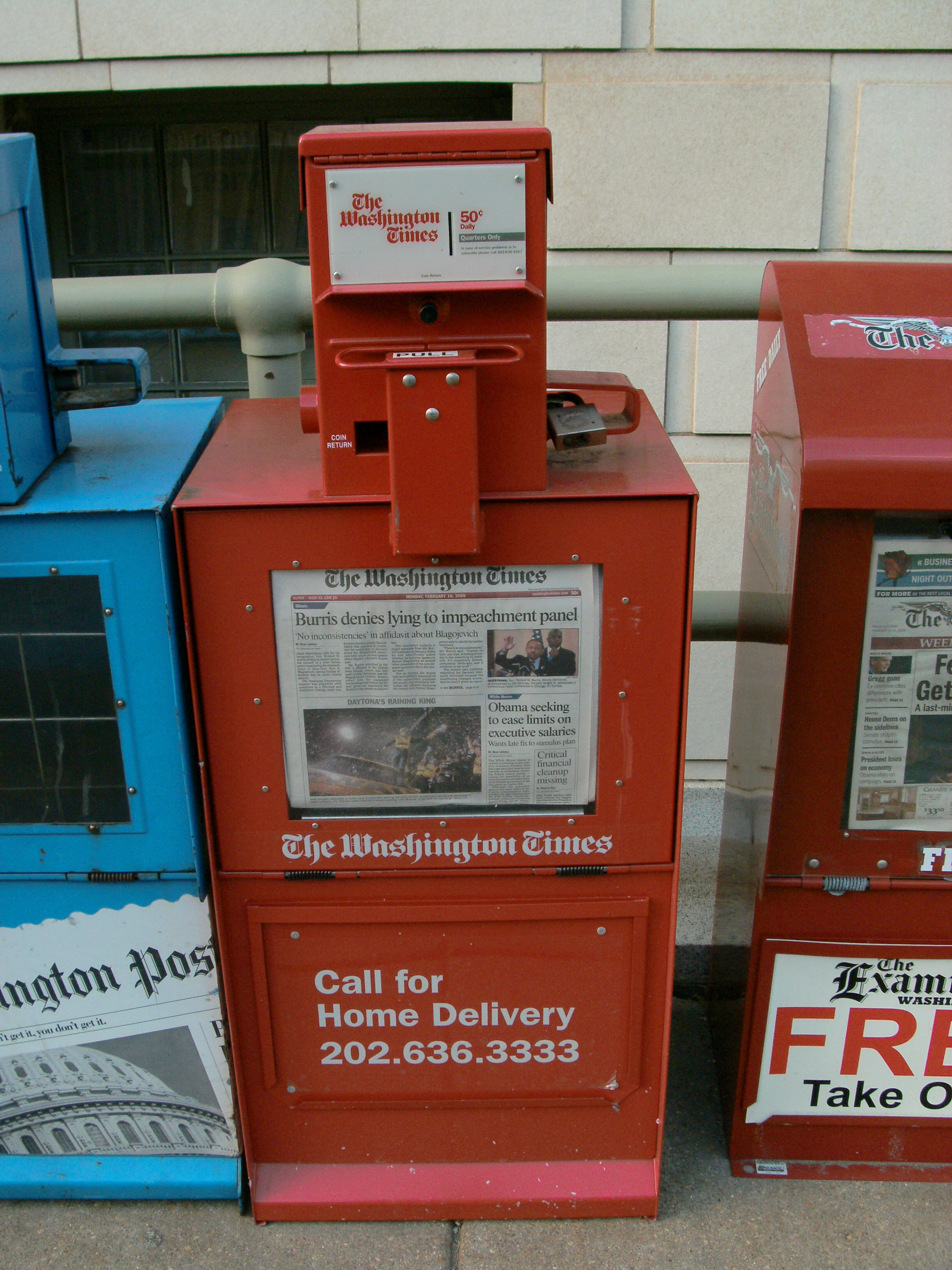
A Washington Times dispenser

In 1991, Moon said he had spent between $900 million and $1 billion on The Washington Times. By 2002, Moon had spent between $1.7 billion and $2 billion, according to different estimates.

Wesley Pruden, previously a correspondent and then a managing editor of The Washington Times, was named executive editor in 1991. During his editorship, the paper took a strongly conservative and nativist editorial stance.

In 1992, North Korean leader Kim Il Sung gave his first and only interview with the Western news media to The Washington Times reporter Josette Sheeran, who later became executive director of the United Nations World Food Programme.

In 1992, The Washington Times had one-eighth the circulation of The Washington Post (100,000 compared to 800,000) and two-thirds of its subscribers subscribed to both papers. In 1994, it introduced a weekly national edition, which was published in a tabloid format and distributed nationally. U.S. President George H. W. Bush encouraged the political influence of The Washington Times and other Unification Church movement activism in support of American foreign policy.

In 1997, the Washington Report on Middle East Affairs, which is critical of U.S. and Israeli policies, praised The Washington Times and its sister publication, The Middle East Times, for what it called their objective and informative coverage of Islam and the Middle East, while criticizing The Washington Times for its generally pro-Israel editorial positions. The Report suggested that these newspapers and The Christian Science Monitor, each owned by religious institutions, were less influenced by pro-Israel pressure groups than corporate-owned newspapers.

=== 2000s ===
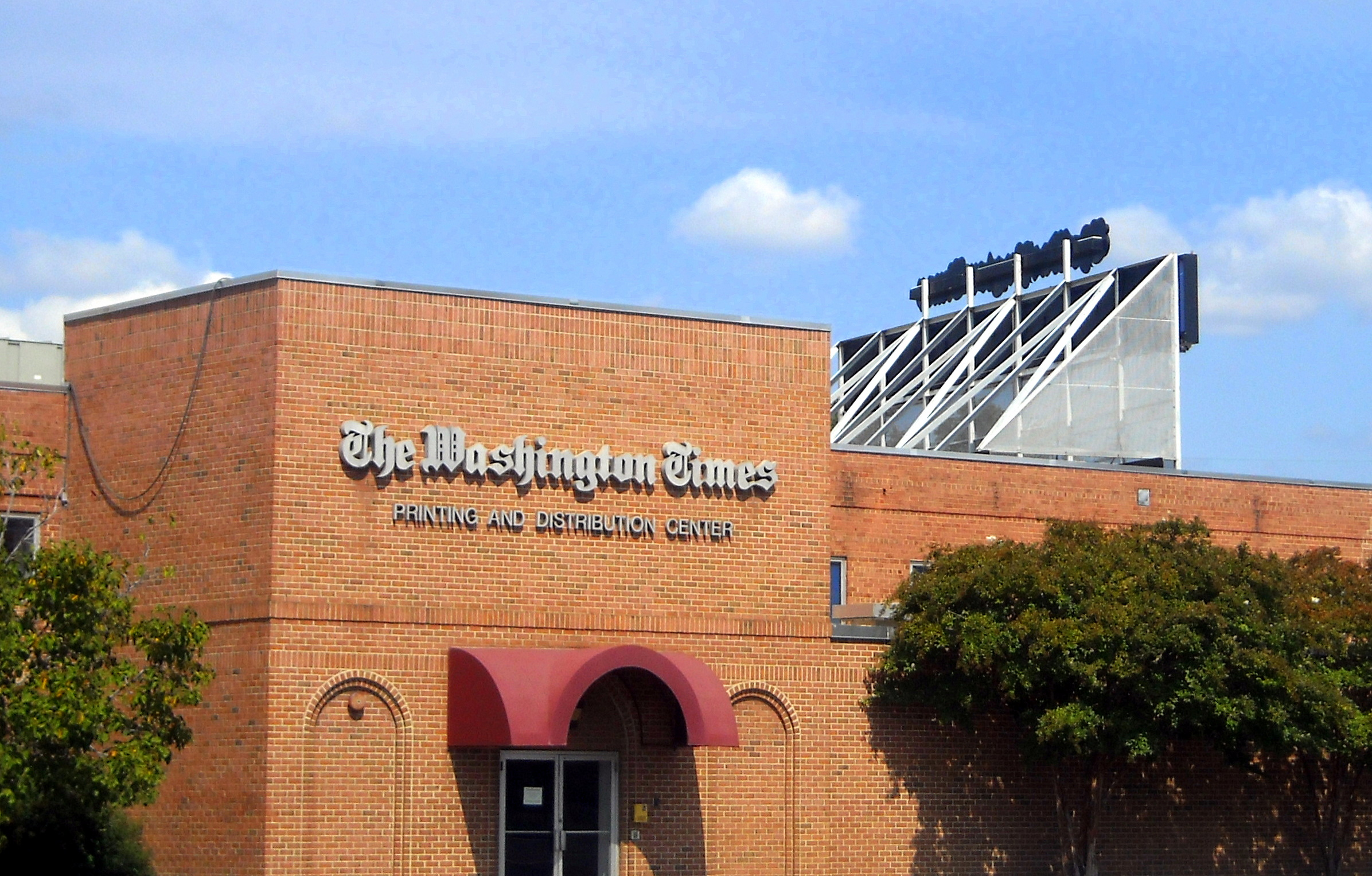
The printing and distribution center of The Washington Times

In 2002, at an event held to celebrate The Washington Times' 20th anniversary, Moon said, "The Washington Times is responsible to let the American people know about God" and "The Washington Times will become the instrument in spreading the truth about God to the world."

In 2004, David Ignatius, a correspondent for The Washington Post, reported that Chung Hwan Kwak, a leader in the Unification Church, wanted The Washington Times to "support international organizations such as the United Nations and to campaign for world peace and interfaith understanding." This, Ignatius wrote, created difficulties for Pruden and some of The Washington Times' columnists. Ignatius also mentioned the Unification Church movement's reconciliatory attitude towards North Korea, which at the time included joint business ventures, and Kwak's advocacy for greater understanding between the U.S. and the Islamic world as issues of contention. Ignatius predicted that conservatives in Congress and the George W. Bush administration would support Pruden's position over Kwak's.

In 2006, Moon's son, Hyun Jin Moon, president and CEO of News World Communications, dismissed managing editor Francis "Fran" Coombs following accusations of racist editorializing. Coombs had made some racist and sexist comments, for which he was sued by other employees at The Washington Times.

In January 2008, Pruden retired, and John F. Solomon, who worked with the Associated Press and had most recently been head of investigative reporting and mixed media development at The Washington Post, was appointed executive editor.

A month later, The Washington Times changed some of its style guide to conform more to what was becoming mainstream media usage. It announced that it would no longer use words like "illegal aliens" and "homosexual" and, in most cases, opt for "more neutral terminology" like "illegal immigrants" and "gay", respectively. It also decided to stop using "Hillary" when referring to then U.S. Senator Hillary Clinton, and the word "marriage" in the expression "gay marriage" would no longer appear in quotes in the newspaper. These policy changes drew criticism from some conservatives. Prospect magazine attributed The Washington Times' apparent political moderation to differences of opinion over the United Nations and North Korea, and wrote, "The Republican right may be losing its most devoted media ally."

In November 2009, The New York Times reported that The Washington Times would no longer be receiving funds from the Unification Church movement and might have to cease publication or become an online publication only. Later that year, it dismissed 40 percent of its 370 employees and stopped its subscription service, instead distributing the paper free in some areas of the Washington metropolitan area, including federal government departments and agencies. However, a subscription website owned by the paper, theconservatives.com, and the Times' three-hour radio program, America's Morning News, both continued. The paper also announced that it would cease publication of its Sunday edition, along with other changes, partly in order to end its reliance on subsidies from the Unification Church.

On December 31, 2009, The Washington Times announced that it would no longer be a full-service newspaper, eliminating its metropolitan news and sports sections.

=== 2010s ===
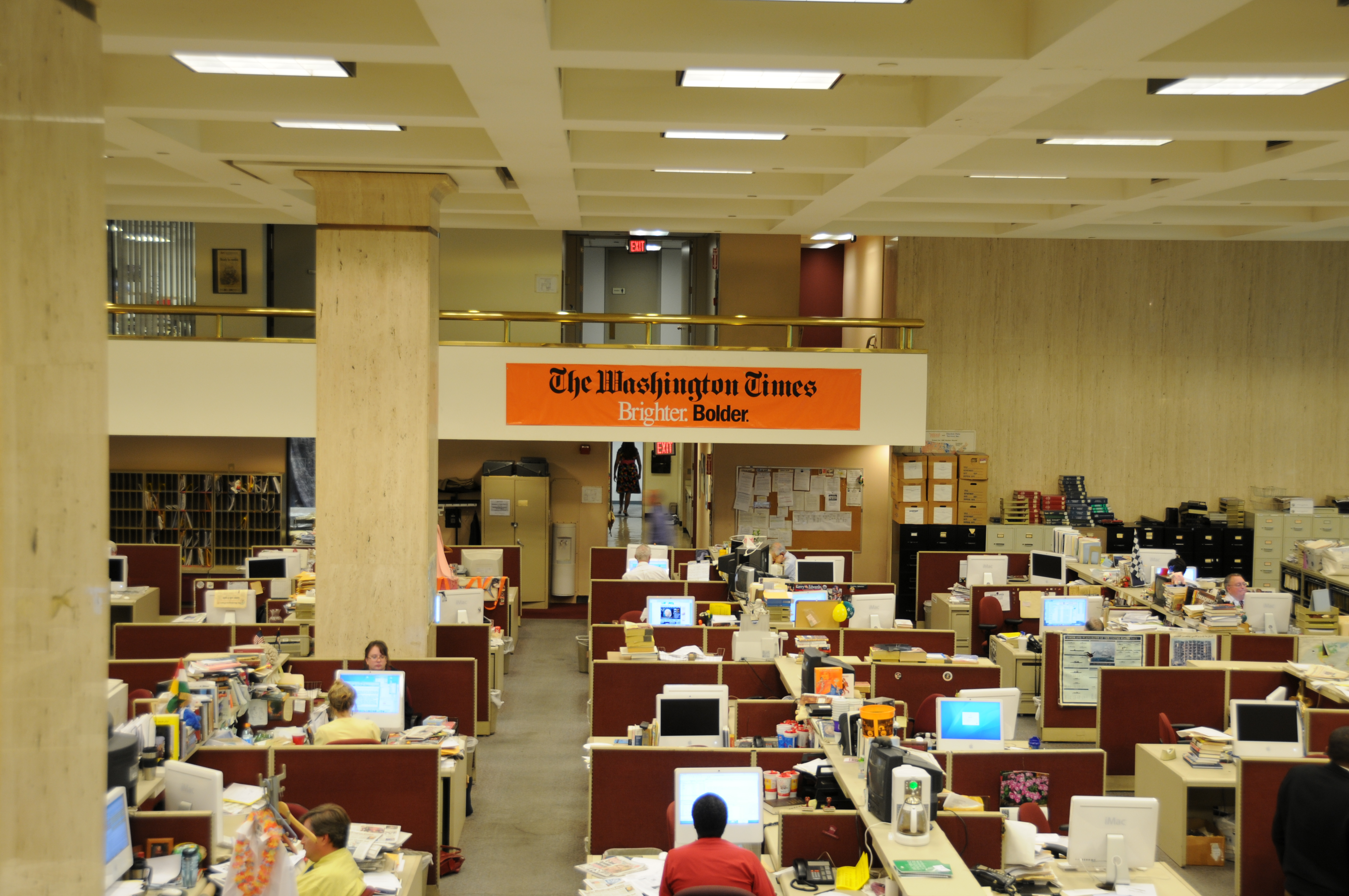
The Washington Times newsroom

In July 2010, the Unification Church issued a letter protesting the direction The Washington Times was taking and urging closer ties with it. In August 2010, a deal was made to sell it to a group more closely related to the movement. Editor-in-chief Sam Dealey said that this was a welcome development among the Times' staff.

In November 2010, Moon and a group of former editors purchased The Washington Times from News World Communications for $1. This ended a conflict within the Moon family that had been threatening to shut down the paper completely. In June 2011, Ed Kelley, formerly of The Oklahoman, was hired as editor overseeing both news and opinion content.

In March 2011, The Washington Times announced that some former staffers would be rehired and that the paper would bring back its sports, metro, and life sections.

In 2012, Douglas D. M. Joo stepped down as senior executive, president, and chairman. Times president Tom McDevitt took his place as chairman, and Larry Beasley was hired as the company's new president and chief executive officer.

In March 2013, The Washington Times partnered with Herring Networks to create a new conservative cable news channel, One America News Network (OAN), which began broadcasting in mid‑2013.

In July 2013, The Washington Times hired David Keene, former president of the National Rifle Association and chairman of the American Conservative Union, to serve as its opinion editor.

In September 2013, Solomon returned as editor and vice president of content and business development. Solomon's tenure was marked by a focus on profitability.

In September 2015, the newspaper had its first profitable month, ending a streak of monthly financial losses over the paper's first 33 years. In December 2015, Solomon left for Circa News.

The Washington Times opinion editor Charles Hurt was one of Trump's earliest supporters in Washington, D.C. During the 2016 presidential election, The Washington Times did not endorse a presidential candidate, but it endorsed Trump for reelection in the 2020 presidential election.

=== 2020s ===
In 2020, during the COVID-19 pandemic, The Washington Times received $1.5 million in federal-backed small business loans from Citibank through the Paycheck Protection Program, which helped retain 91 employees. The loan was forgiven. During the 2024 presidential election, The Washington Times endorsed Trump for election.

== Reactions ==
In the 1980s, reporters for The Washington Times visited imprisoned then South African activist Nelson Mandela, who wrote about the newspaper in his autobiography, Long Walk to Freedom. He said, "They seemed less intent on finding out my views than on proving that I was a Communist and a terrorist. All of their questions were slanted in that direction, and when I reiterated that I was neither a Communist nor a terrorist, they attempted to show that I was not a Christian either by asserting that the Reverend Martin Luther King never resorted to violence."

The Washington Times holds a conservative political stance. In 1995, the Columbia Journalism Review wrote that The Washington Times "is like no major city daily in America in the way that it wears its political heart on its sleeve. No major paper in America would dare be so partisan." In 2002, The Washington Post reported that the newspaper "was established by Moon to combat communism and be a conservative alternative to what Moon perceived as the liberal leanings of The Washington Post. Since then, the paper has fought to prove its editorial independence, trying to demonstrate that it is neither a "Moonie paper" nor a booster of the political right but rather a fair and balanced reporter of the news."

In October 2002, veteran Washington Post editor Ben Bradlee complimented The Washington Times, saying, "I see them get some local stories that I think the Post doesn't have and should have had." In 2007, Mother Jones reported that The Washington Times had become "essential reading for political news junkies" soon after its founding, and described it as a "conservative newspaper with close ties to every Republican administration since Reagan."

In August 2008, in a Harper's essay, American historian Thomas Frank linked The Washington Times to the modern American conservative movement, saying: "There is even a daily newspaper—The Washington Times—published strictly for the movement's benefit, a propaganda sheet whose distortions are so obvious and so alien that it puts one in mind of those official party organs one encounters when traveling in authoritarian countries."

In January 2011, conservative commentator Paul Weyrich said, "The Washington Post became very arrogant and they just decided that they would determine what was news and what wasn't news and they wouldn't cover a lot of things that went on. And The Washington Times has forced the Post to cover a lot of things that they wouldn't cover if the Times wasn't in existence."

In December 2012, The New York Times wrote that The Washington Times had become "a crucial training ground for many rising conservative journalists and a must-read for those in the movement. A veritable who's who of conservatives—Tony Blankley, Frank J. Gaffney Jr., Larry Kudlow, John Podhoretz and Tony Snow—has churned out copy for its pages." The Columbia Journalism Review noted that reporters for The Washington Times had used it as a springboard to other mainstream news outlets.

== Awards ==
- In 2013, The Washington Times won two Sigma Delta Chi Awards from the Society of Professional Journalists for excellence in journalism, including "Professional Journalists for Deadline Reporting (Daily Circulation of 1–50,000)" and "Investigative Reporting (Daily Circulation 1–50,000)".
- In 2014, Thom Loverro, lead sports columnist for The Washington Times, won a Sigma Delta Chi Award for Sports Column Writing.
- In 2018, Guy Taylor and Dan Boylan, reporters for The Washington Times, won Honorable Mentions for the 31st annual Gerald R. Ford Journalism Prize for Distinguished Reporting on the Presidency.
- In 2019, The Washington Times advertising department won first and third place in the VPA News and Advertising contest in the Special Sections (standalone section non-slick cover) category. Outstanding design and creative artwork for the Qatar and Rolling Thunder Special Section covers landed the department the award.
- In 2020, Alexander Hunter, designer and editorial illustrator for The Washington Times, won the Sigma Delta Chi Award for excellence in journalism.

== Controversies ==
=== General controversies ===
Some former employees, including Whelan, have insisted that The Washington Times was always under Moon's control. Whelan, whose contract guaranteed editorial autonomy, left the paper in 1984 when the owners refused to renew his contract. Three years later, editorial page editor William P. Cheshire and four of his staff resigned, charging that, at the explicit direction of Sang Kook Han, a top official of the Unification Church, executive editor Arnaud de Borchgrave had stifled editorial criticism of political repression in South Korea under President Chun Doo-hwan.

In 1982, The Washington Times refused to publish film critic Scott Sublett's negative review of the movie Inchon, which was also sponsored by the Unification Church.

In 1988, The Washington Times published a misleading story suggesting that Democratic presidential candidate Michael Dukakis had sought psychiatric help, and included a quote from Dukakis' sister-in-law saying "it is possible" he visited a psychiatrist. However, The Washington Times clipped the full quote by the sister-in-law, which was: "It's possible, but I doubt it."

Reporter Peggy Weyrich quit in 1991 after one of her articles about Anita Hill's testimony in the Clarence Thomas Supreme Court nominee hearings was rewritten to depict Hill as a "fantasizer". During the presidency of Bill Clinton The Washington Times reporting on his alleged sex scandals was often picked up by other, more respected, news media which contributed to enhanced public awareness of the topic, and eventually to Clinton's impeachment. In 1999 the Senate voted to acquit Clinton, allowing him to complete his second term as president.

In a 1997 column in The Washington Times, Frank Gaffney falsely alleged that a seismic incident in Russia was a nuclear detonation at that nation's Novaya Zemlya test site, which would have meant that Russia had violated the Comprehensive Test Ban Treaty (CTB). Subsequent scientific analysis of the Novaya Zemlya event showed that it was an earthquake. Reporting on the allegation, the Bulletin of the Atomic Scientists observed that following its publication: "fax machines around Washington, D.C. and across the country poured out pages detailing Russian duplicity. They came from Frank Gaffney."

In 2002, The Washington Times published a story accusing the National Educational Association (NEA), the largest teachers' union in the United States, of teaching students that the policies of the U.S. government were partly responsible for the 2001 terrorist attacks on the World Trade Center. The NEA responded to the story by denying all of its accusations. Brendan Nyhan, later a political science professor at the University of Michigan, wrote that The Washington Times story was a lie and a myth.

In 2018, The Washington Times published a commentary piece by retired U.S. Navy admiral James A. Lyons which promoted conspiracy theories about the murder of Seth Rich. Lyon wrote that it was "well known in intelligence circles that Seth Rich and his brother, Aaron Rich, downloaded the DNC emails and was paid by WikiLeaks for that information." The piece cited no evidence for the assertion. Aaron Rich filed a lawsuit against The Washington Times, saying that it acted with "reckless disregard for the truth" and that it did not retract or remove the piece after "receiving notice of the falsity of the statements about Aaron after the publication". Rich and The Washington Times settled their lawsuit, and the paper issued an unusually robust retraction.

On January 6, 2021, after violent pro-Trump rioters attacked the United States Capitol, The Washington Times published a false story quoting an unidentified retired military officer claiming that the facial recognition system company XRVision had used its technology and identified two members of antifa amid the mob. XRVision quickly denied this, sending a cease and desist to The Washington Times, and issued a statement saying that its technology had actually identified two Neo-Nazis and a believer in the QAnon conspiracy theory and that it had not done any detection work for a retired military officer authorized to share that information. On January 7, the article was removed from the website and replaced with a corrected version. Before the correction, Representative Matt Gaetz cited the original story as proof that antifa were partially responsible for the attack in the floor debate of the 2021 United States Electoral College vote count, and it was widely shared on social media.

The Washington Times has twice published articles, one written by the ambassador of Turkey to the United States and one by an attorney and lobbyist for the Turkish government, that featured Armenian genocide denial.

=== Science coverage ===
==== Climate change denial ====
The Washington Times has promoted climate change denial. Michael E. Mann, director of the Earth System Science Center at Pennsylvania State University, characterizes The Washington Times as a prominent outlet that propagates "climate change disinformation". Naomi Oreskes, Professor of the History of Science at Harvard University, and Erik M. Conway, historian of science at NASA's Jet Propulsion Laboratory at the California Institute of Technology, wrote in their 2010 book Merchants of Doubt that The Washington Times has given the public a false sense that the science of anthropogenic climate change was in dispute by giving disproportionate coverage of fringe viewpoints and by preventing scientists from rebutting coverage in The Washington Times. The Washington Times reprinted a column by Steve Milloy criticizing research of climate change in the Arctic without disclosing Milloy's financial ties to the fossil fuel industry.

In 1993, The Washington Times published articles purporting to debunk climate change. It headlined its story about the 1997 Kyoto Protocol on climate change: "Under the deal, the use of coal, oil and other fossil fuel in the United States would be cut by more than one-third by 2002, resulting in lower standards of living for consumers and a long-term reduction in economic growth."

During the Climatic Research Unit email controversy (also known as "Climategate") in 2009 in the lead-up to the UN Climate Change Conference in Copenhagen, The Washington Times wrote in an editorial: "these revelations of fudged science should have a cooling effect on global-warming hysteria and the panicked policies that are being pushed forward to address the unproven theory." Eight committees investigated the controversy and found no evidence of fraud or scientific misconduct. In 2010, The Washington Times published an article claiming that February 2010 snow storms "Undermin[e] The Case For Global Warming One Flake At A Time". A 2014 The Washington Times editorial mocked the "global warming scam" and asserted: "The planetary thermometer hasn't budged in 15 years. Wildfires, tornadoes, hurricanes and other 'extreme' weather events are at normal or below-normal levels. Pacific islands aren't submerged. There's so much ice the polar bears are celebrating." The Washington Times cited a blog post in support of these claims; PolitiFact fact-checked the claims in the blog post and concluded it was "pants-on-fire" false. The Washington Times later said that a NASA scientist claimed that global warming was on a "hiatus" and that NASA had found evidence of global cooling; Rebecca Leber of The New Republic said that the NASA scientist in question said the opposite of what The Washington Times claimed.

In 2015, The Washington Times published a column by Republican Texas congressman Lamar Smith in which he argued that the work of the National Oceanic and Atmospheric Administration was "not good science, [but] science fiction." The American Association for the Advancement of Science and six other scientific organizations objected to Smith's politicalisation of scientific research saying: "Scientists should not be subjected to fraud investigations or harassment simply for providing scientific results that some may see as politically controversial. Science cannot thrive when policymakers—regardless of party affiliation—use policy disagreements as a pretext to attack scientific conclusions."

In November 2021, a study by the Center for Countering Digital Hate described The Washington Times as being among "ten fringe publishers" that together were responsible for nearly 70 percent of Facebook user interactions with content that denied climate change. Facebook disputed the study's methodology.

==== Ozone depletion denial ====
In the 1990s, The Washington Times published columns which cast doubt on the scientific consensus on the causes of ozone depletion (which had led to the "ozone hole"). It published columns disputing the science as late as 2000. In 1991, NASA scientists warned of the potential of a major Arctic ozone hole developing in the spring of 1992 due to elevated levels of chlorine monoxide in the Arctic stratosphere. However, as the Arctic winter was unusually warm, the chemical reactions needed for ozone depletion did not occur. Even though the science was not incorrect, The Washington Times, along with other conservative media, subsequently created a "crying wolf" narrative, where scientists were portrayed as political activists who were following an environmental agenda rather than the science. In 1992, it published an editorial saying: "This is not the disinterested, objective, just-the-facts tone one ordinarily expects from scientists... This is the cry of the apocalyptic, laying the groundwork for a decidedly non-scientific end: public policy... it would be nice if the next time NASA cries 'wolf,' fewer journalists, politicians and citizens heed the warning like sheep."

==== Second-hand smoke denial ====
In 1995, The Washington Times published a column by Fred Singer, who is known for promoting views contrary to mainstream science on a number of issues, where Singer referred to the science on the adverse health impact of second-hand smoke as the "second-hand smoke scare" and accused the Environmental Protection Agency of distorting data when it classified second-hand smoke as harmful. Singer's column also denied the scientific consensus on climate change and on the health risks of exposure to environmental radiation. In 1995, The Washington Times published an editorial titled "How not to spend science dollars" condemning a grant to the National Cancer Institute to study how political contributions from tobacco companies shape policy-making and the voting behavior of politicians.

==== Coverage of the COVID-19 pandemic ====
In January 2020, The Washington Times published two articles about the COVID-19 pandemic that suggested that the virus was created by the government of the People's Republic of China as a biological weapon. One article quoted a former Israeli intelligence officer as a source. The two articles were shared on hundreds of social media sites, potentially reaching an audience of millions.

In March 2023, The Washington Times published an article which falsely claimed that "Vaccines don't work, masks don't work: Everything government told us about COVID-19 was wrong." The article was shared by Danish conspiracy theorist Anastasia Maria Loupis on Twitter.

=== Allegations of racism ===
==== Wesley Pruden controversy ====
Under Pruden's editorship (1992–2008), The Washington Times regularly printed excerpts from racist hard-right publications, including VDARE and American Renaissance, and from Bill White, leader of the American National Socialist Workers' Party, in its Culture Briefs section.

In 2013, Columbia Journalism Review reported that under Pruden's editorship The Washington Times was: "a forum for the racialist hard right, including white nationalists, neo-Confederates, and anti-immigrant scare mongers." Between 1998 and 2004, the Times covered every biennial American Renaissance conference, hosted by the white supremacist New Century Foundation. According to the Columbia Journalism Review, "the paper's coverage of these events—which are hotbeds for holocaust deniers, neo-Nazis, and eugenicists—was stunningly one sided", and favorably depicted the conference and attendees. In 2009, journalist David Neiwert wrote that it championed, "various white-nationalist causes emanating from the neo-Confederate movement (with which, until a recent housecleaning, two senior editors had long associations.)"

A page in The Washington Times' Sunday edition was devoted to the American Civil War, on which the Confederacy was several times described with admiration. In 1993, Pruden gave an interview to the neo-Confederate magazine Southern Partisan, which has been called "arguably the most important neo-Confederate periodical" by the Southern Poverty Law Center, where he said: "Every year I make sure that we have a story in the paper about any observance of Robert E. Lee's birthday." Pruden said, "And the fact that it falls around Martin Luther King's birthday," to which a Southern Partisan interviewer interjected, "Makes it all the better," with Pruden finishing, "I make sure we have a story. Oh, yes."

==== Sam Francis controversy ====
The Washington Times employed Sam Francis, a white nationalist, as a columnist and editor, beginning in 1991 after he was chosen by Pat Buchanan to take over his column.

In 1995, Francis resigned or was forced out after Dinesh D'Souza reported on racist comments that Francis made at a conference hosted by American Renaissance the previous year. At the conference, Francis called on whites to: "reassert our identity and our solidarity, and we must do so in explicitly racial terms through the articulation of a racial consciousness as whites... The civilization that we as whites created in Europe and America could not have developed apart from the genetic endowments of the creating people."

Francis was an aide to Republican senator John East of North Carolina before joining the editorial staff of The Washington Times in 1986. Five years later, he became a columnist for the newspaper, and his column became syndicated. In addition to his journalistic career, Francis was an adjunct scholar at the Ludwig von Mises Institute of Auburn, Alabama.

In June 1995, editor-in-chief Wesley Pruden "had cut back on Francis' column" after The Washington Times ran his essay criticizing the Southern Baptist Convention for its approval of a resolution which apologized for slavery. In the piece, Francis asserted that "The contrition of the Southern Baptists for slavery and racism is a bit more than a politically fashionable gesture intended to massage race relations" and that "Neither slavery nor racism as an institution is a sin."

In September 1995, Pruden dismissed Francis from The Washington Times after conservative journalist Dinesh D'Souza, in a column in The Washington Post, described Francis's appearance at the 1994 American Renaissance conference:

A lively controversialist, Francis began with some largely valid complaints about how the Southern heritage is demonized in mainstream culture. He went on, however, to attack the liberal principles of humanism and universalism for facilitating "the war against the white race". At one point he described country music megastar Garth Brooks as "repulsive" because "he has that stupid universalist song (We Shall Be Free), in which we all intermarry."

After D'Souza's column was published, Pruden "decided he did not want the Times associated with such views after looking into other Francis writings, in which he advocated the possible deportation of legal immigrants and forced birth control for welfare mothers."

When Francis died in 2005, The Washington Times wrote a "glowing" obituary that omitted his racist beliefs and his firing from the paper, and described him as a "scholarly, challenging and sometimes pungent writer"; in response, editor David Mastio of the conservative Washington Examiner wrote in an obituary: "Sam Francis was merely a racist and doesn't deserve to be remembered as anything less." Mastio added that Francis: "led a double life – by day he served up conservative, red meat that was strong but never quite out of bounds by mainstream standards; by night, unbeknownst to the Times or his syndicate, he pushed white supremacist ideas."

==== Southern Poverty Law Center report ====
The Southern Poverty Law Center (SPLC) noted that The Washington Times had, by 2005, published at least 35 articles by Marian Kester Coombs, who was married to managing editor Francis Coombs. She had a record of racially incendiary rhetoric and had written for the white nationalist magazine The Occidental Quarterly, which has been described as a "stalwart" of the alt-right movement in the United States and as a "far-right, racially obsessed US magazine". The SPLC highlighted columns written by Marian Kester Coombs in The Washington Times, in which she asserted that the whole of human history was "the struggle of ... races"; that non-white immigration is the "importing [of] poverty and revolution" that will end in "the eventual loss of sovereign American territory"; and that Muslims in England "are turning life in this once pleasant land into a misery for its native inhabitants."

=== Coverage of Barack Obama ===
In 2007 The Washington Times' companion news magazine Insight on the News, also called just Insight, published a story which claimed that someone on the campaign staff of American presidential candidate Senator Hillary Clinton had leaked a report to one of Insight's reporters which said that Obama had "spent at least four years in a so-called madrassa, or Muslim seminary, in Indonesia". Insight's editor, Jeff Kuhner, also claimed that the source said that the Clinton campaign was "preparing an accusation that her rival Senator Barack Obama had covered up a brief period he had spent in an Islamic religious school in Indonesia when he was six." Clinton denied the allegations. When interviewed by The New York Times, Kuhner refused to name the person said to be the reporter's source to The New York Times.

Insight's story was reported on first by conservative talk radio and Fox News Channel, and then by The New York Times and other major newspapers. CNN reporter John Vause visited State Elementary School Menteng 01, a secular public school which Obama had attended for one year after attending a Roman Catholic school for three, and found that each student received two hours of religious instruction per week in his or her own faith. He was told by Hardi Priyono, deputy headmaster of the school, "This is a public school. We don't focus on religion. In our daily lives, we try to respect religion, but we don't give preferential treatment." Students at Besuki wore Western clothing, and the Chicago Tribune described the school as "so progressive that teachers wore miniskirts and all students were encouraged to celebrate Christmas".

Interviews by Nedra Pickler of the Associated Press found that students of all faiths have been welcome there since before Obama's attendance. Akmad Solichin, the vice principal of the school, told Pickler: "The allegations are completely baseless. Yes, most of our students are Muslim, but there are Christians as well. Everyone's welcome here ... it's a public school."

In 2008, The Washington Times published a column by Frank Gaffney that promoted the false conspiracy theories which asserted that President Barack Obama was born in Kenya and was courting the "jihadist vote". Gaffney also published pieces in 2009 and 2010 promoting the false assertion that Obama is a Muslim.

In a 2009 column entitled "'Inner Muslim' at work in Cairo", Pruden wrote that President Obama was the: "first president without an instinctive appreciation of the culture, history, tradition, common law and literature whence America sprang. The genetic imprint writ large in his 43 predecessors is missing from the Obama DNA." In another 2009 column, Pruden wrote that Obama had "no natural instinct or blood impulse" for what America was about because he was "sired by a Kenyan father" and "born to a mother attracted to men of the Third World." Pruden's columns stirred controversy, leading The Washington Times to assign David Mastio, its deputy editor, to edit his work.

In 2016, The Washington Times claimed that $3.6 million in federal funds were spent on a 2013 golf outing for President Obama and pro-golfer Tiger Woods which was widely reported on by the American news media in 2013. Snopes rated the article "mostly false", because the estimated cost included both official presidential travel and a brief vacation in Florida. The online article contained hyperlinks to other, unrelated, stories from The Washington Times. These links' appearance were not readily distinguishable from the citation links sometimes used to support or substantiate reporting. Not included in The Washington Times the article were any links to the Government Accountability Office (GAO) report of expenditure for the 2013 trip, which included a detailed overview of President Obama's activities of February 15 to 18, 2013.

=== Allegations of Islamophobia ===
Frank Gaffney, a weekly contributor for The Washington Times from the late 1990s to 2016, was regularly accused of promoting Islamophobic and anti-Muslim views. According to John Esposito, a professor of Religion and International Affairs and of Islamic Studies at Georgetown University, Gaffney's "editorial track record in The Washington Times is long on accusation and short on supportive evidence." In columns for The Washington Times, Gaffney helped to popularize conspiracy theories that Islamic terrorists were infiltrating the Bush administration, the conservative movement and the Obama administration.

In 2015, The Washington Times published a column describing refugees fleeing the Syrian Civil War as an "Islamic Trojan Horse" conducting a "'jihad' by another name".

In 2016 the Muslim advocacy group Council on American–Islamic Relations listed The Washington Times among media outlets it said "regularly demonstrates or supports Islamophobic themes." In 1998, the Egyptian newspaper Al-Ahram described the editorial policy of The Washington Times as "rabidly anti-Arab, anti-Muslim and pro-Israel."

== Staff ==
=== Editors-in-chief ===
- James R. Whelan (1982–1984)
- Smith Hempstone (1984–1986)
- Arnaud de Borchgrave (1986–1992)
- Wesley Pruden (1992–2008)
- John F. Solomon (2008–2009) (2013–2015)
- Sam Dealey (2010)
- Ed Kelley (2011–2012)
- David S. Jackson (2012–2013)
- Christopher Dolan (present as of 2024)

=== Managing editors ===
- Josette Shiner (1992–1997)
- Francis Coombs (?–2008)
- Cathy Gaynor (present as of 2024)

=== Opinion editors ===
- Ann Crutcher (1984–1985)
- William P. Cheshire (1985–1987)
- Tony Snow (1987–1990)
- Tod Lindberg (1991–1998)
- Tony Blankley (2002–2007)
- Richard Miniter (2009)
- Brett Decker (2009–2013)
- Wesley Pruden (2013)
- David Keene (2014–2016)
- Charles Hurt (2016–present)

=== Current commentary contributors ===
- Jennifer Harper ("Inside the Beltway" columnist)
- Charles Hurt (opinion editor and columnist)
- Mark Kellner (faith and family reporter)
- Robert H. Knight (opinion columnist)
- Stephen Moore (opinion columnist)
- Everett Piper (opinion columnist)
- Cal Thomas (opinion columnist)

=== Former contributors ===
- George Archibald (congressional, political, United Nations, and education reporter)
- Bruce Bartlett (opinion columnist)
- David Brooks (editorial writer, film reviewer)
- Amanda Carpenter (columnist)
- Ben Carson (opinion columnist)
- Monica Crowley (online opinion editor and columnist)
- Dave Fay (editor and journalists, deceased)
- Bruce Fein (opinion columnist)
- Sam Francis (editor and columnist, deceased)
- Frank Gaffney (columnist)
- Madison Gesiotto Gilbert (opinion columnist)
- Michael Hayden (opinion columnist)
- Nat Hentoff (opinion columnist)
- Shirley A. Husar (opinion columnist)
- Ernest Istook (opinion columnist)
- Drew Johnson (columnist)
- Tom Knott (sports columnist)
- Larry Kudlow (economics columnist)
- Jeff Kuhner (opinion columnist)
- Willie Lawson (opinion columnist)
- Tod Lindberg (opinion columnist)
- Herbert London (opinion columnist) (deceased)
- Michelle Malkin (columnist)
- John McCaslin ("Inside the Beltway" columnist)
- Oliver North (opinion columnist)
- Ted Nugent (opinion columnist)
- Rand Paul (opinion columnist)
- Jeremiah O'Leary
- John Podhoretz (columnist)
- Wesley Pruden (editor emeritus and opinion columnist)
- Fred Reed (journalist)
- Rob Redding (journalist and talk host)
- James S. Robbins (opinion columnist)
- Bill Sammon (White House correspondent)
- Mercedes Schlapp (opinion columnist)
- Thomas Sowell (columnist)
- Mark Steyn (opinion columnist)
- Janine Turner (opinion columnist)
- Harlan K. Ullman (opinion columnist)
- Diana West (opinion columnist)

=== Others ===
- Julia Duin: Religion editor
- Daniel Wattenberg: Arts and Entertainment editor

== See also ==
- Media in Washington, D.C., List of newspapers in Washington, D.C.
- News World Communications
- The Unification Church and politics
- Unification Church of the United States
- The Washington Post (1877–present)
- The Washington Star (1852–1981)
- Washington Times-Herald, a former Washington, D.C. daily newspaper founded by William Randolph Hearst as The Evening Times
- Fox News
- Insight on the News
