= Tudi Township =

Tudi Township 土地乡
- Township
- Location in Chongqing
- Coordinates: 29°30′15″N 107°54′23″E
- Country: People's Republic of China
- Direct-administered municipality: Chongqing
- District: Wulong District
- Time zone: UTC+8 (China Standard)

Tudi Township (simplified Chinese: 土地乡; traditional Chinese: 土地鄉; pinyin: Tǔdì Xiāng) is a township in Wulong District, Chongqing, China. As of 2020, it administers Yanhe Village (沿河村), Xiaoyan Village (小岩村), Tiansheng Village (天生村), and Liujing Village (六井村).

== See also ==
- List of township-level divisions of Chongqing
