= Pak Kyongni =

South Korean novelist (1926–2008)

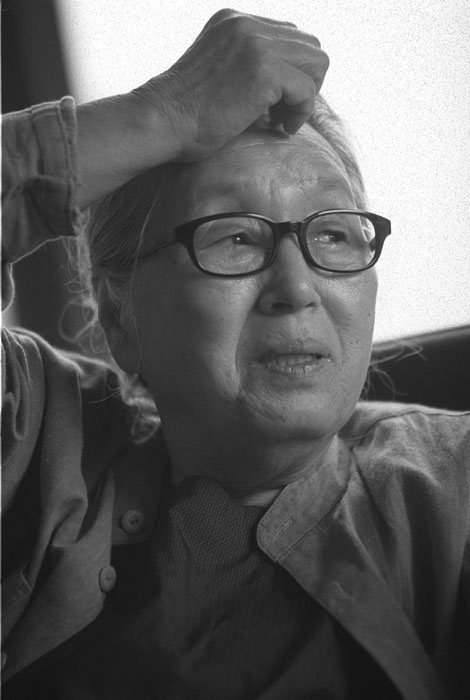

Korean name
- Hangul: 박금이
- Hanja: 朴今伊
- RR: Bak Geumi
- MR: Pak Kŭmi

Pen name
- Hangul: 박경리
- Hanja: 朴景利
- RR: Bak Gyeongri
- MR: Pak Kyŏngni

Pak Kyongni or Bak Kyoungli (Note: This is the author's preferred Romanization per LTI Korea.) (Korean: 박경리; December 2, 1926 – May 5, 2008) was a South Korean novelist.

Bak Kyoungli was born in Tōei, Korea, Empire of Japan (today Tongyeong, South Korea); later she lived in Wonju, Gangwon Province. Bak made her literary debut in 1955, with Gyesan (계산, Calculations). She is, however, most well known for her 20-volume story Toji (토지, The Land), an epic saga set on the turbulent history of Korea during 19th and 20th century. It was later adapted into a movie, a television series and an opera. Toji is regarded as one of the greatest contributions to Korean literature. South Korea-based international literary award Park Kyong-ni Prize, one of the richest literary prizes in the world, was named after her in 2011.

Bak Kyoungli died from lung cancer at the age of 81 on May 5, 2008 and many literary writers recollected her as a guide for their literary works and life as a writer. She was posthumously awarded the country's top medal by the newly created Culture Ministry of South Korea for her promoting South Korean arts.

== Biography ==
Bak Kyoungli was born as the first daughter to a middle-class family in 1926 in Tōei, Korea, Empire of Japan. Her birth name was Bak Geum-i (박금이). Her parents married when her mother was eighteen and her father, Bak Soo-young (박수영), fourteen. The relationship between her parents did not go well, which deeply affected her life. Her problems started when her father left her mother immediately after her birth. Later, she said that she had both sympathy and contempt toward her mother, but hatred against her father. Her response was to isolate herself in an imaginary world centered around her books.

In 1946, one year after her graduation from Jinju Girls' High school (진주 고등 여학교), she married Gim Hangdo (김행도), a clerk of the Office of Monopoly (전매부, now the Korea Tobacco & Ginseng Corporation). However, her problems did not end with her marriage. Her husband was accused of being a communist, then went missing during the Korean War and eventually died in Seodaemun Prison. She lost her 3 year-old baby son in the same year. As a widow, she provided the sole financial support for her daughter and mother.

She began her career as a professional writer in 1955 after a recommendation by the novelist and poet, Kim Tong-ni (김동리). She underwent surgery for breast cancer in the 1960s and had to raise her grandson, Wonbo, after her son-in-law and poet, Kim Ji-ha (김지하) was arrested for allegedly being a communist in the 1970s. She later suffered from lung cancer.

== Work ==
When she debuted, she said "If I had been happy, I would have not begun writing." She also said later, "I live with my mother and daughter and had to support them financially by myself. I began writing since I had hope to get away from my adversity." Her difficult personal life surely influenced her works, where she emphasized human dignity.

She started her career as a writer with the novel, Calculations (계산, Gyesan) and her early work was heavily influenced by her personal circumstances. The narrators in her novels like Time of Distrust (불신 시대, Boolsin Sidae) and Time of Darkness (암흑 시대, Amheuk Sidae) are often women living with their mothers who lost a husband and son, reflecting her own life. In her later work, The Daughters of Pharmacist Kim (김 약국의 딸들, Kimyakgukui Ddaldeul), she emphasizes characters who overcome their difficulties. Later, her point of view became more objective in that her fictional setting moved from the Korean War period to everyday life; employing more varied styles and topics.

== Toji (The Land) ==
Toji (The Land) is the most famous of her novels. This epic novel was started as a serial publication in the September 1969 issue of Modern Literature (현대 문학, Hyundae Munhak). It took her 25 years to write. Its theme is the turbulence at the turn of the 20th century when the Korean people were struggling against Japanese imperialism and has hundreds of characters from across the Korean peninsula; following them from the late 19th century to the early 20th century through Japan's colonial rule to the division of the peninsula. "Kim Gilsang" (김길상) and "Choi Seohee" (최서희), the main protagonists of the novel, like those in her other novels, struggle to save their own dignity in the most turbulent period of Korean history. It employs native folk language and diverse character portrayals, depicting Korea's modern history through the love of a vast "Mother Earth".

It has been made into a TV series, a movie, and an opera. It has also been translated into several languages including English, German, French and Japanese as well as being included in the UNESCO Collection of Representative Works.

She opened the "Toji Cultural Center" on the site of her original home in Wonju, Gangwon Province, in 1999, to help nurture new writers. She also served as a chairperson of the board of trustees of the "Toji Cultural Foundation", which was established in 1996.

== Works ==
=== In Korean ===
- 1955 Calculation (계산, Gyesan)
- 1956 Black and Black and White and White (흑흑백백, Heukheuk baekbaek)
- 1957 Period of Distrust (불신 시대, Boolsin Sidae)
- 1957 Missions
- 1958 Love Song (연가, Yeonga )
- 1958 Byeokji (벽지)
- 1958 Time of Darkness (암흑 시대, Amheuk Sidae)
- 1959 Pyoryudo (표류도)
- 1962 The Daughters of Pharmacist Kim (김 약국의 딸들, Kim Yakgukui Ttaldeul)
- 1963 Pasi (파시)
- 1965 The Market and War field (시장과 전장, Sijang gwa Jeonjang)
- 1965 Green Zone (Nokjidae, 녹지대)
- 1969–1994 Toji (토지 The Land)
- My Mind is Lake (내 마음은 호수)
- Blue Galaxy (푸른 은하)

=== In translation ===
- Land 1 (토지 1)
- Land 2 (토지 2)
- Land 3 (토지 3)
- Land 4 (토지 4)
- Markt und Krieg (시장과 전장)
- Дочери аптекаря Кима (김 약국의 딸들)
- The Curse of Kim's Daughters (김 약국의 딸들)
- 土地 第一部 第二卷 (토지 1)
- 土地 第一部 第二卷 (토지 2)
- 土地 第一部 第三卷 (토지 3)
- 金药局家的女儿们 (김 약국의 딸들)
- La Terre (토지)
- Les filles du Pharmacien Kim (김 약국의 딸들)

== Awards ==
- The Woltan Literature Award (for Land).
- Contemporary Literature (Hyundae Munhak) Award (1958)
- Inchon Award
- Korean Women's Literature Award
- The Bogwan Order of Cultural Merit (awarded 1992).
- Order of Cultural Merit, Geum-gwan Medal (Gold Crown) 금관장 (awarded posthumously).

== Legacy ==
On June 20, 2018, the first monument to her outside of South Korea was erected in Saint Petersburg.
