= Toji (novel) =

Korean novel published from 1969 to 1994

- Hangul: 토지
- Hanja: 土地
- RR: Toji
- MR: T'oji

Toji (Korean: 토지), known in English as Land, is a 16-volume Korean novel written by Park Kyong-ni from 1969 to 1994. It tells the story of five generations of a wealthy Korean family from South Gyeongsang Province. The novel was very popular in South Korea, where it was made into a film and a television series. Part I (of five) was translated into English by Agnita Tennant, as part of a UNESCO Collection of Representative Works project.

== Plot ==
Toji is a total of five parts and sixteen volumes. It deals with the Choi's and Lee Yong's family history through the end of the Joseon dynasty, Japanese occupation and independence. The novel, taking place in Pyeongsa-ri in Hadong, Yongjeong in Gando, Seoul, and Jinju, describes how the Choi family is brought to ruin and eventually rises to the challenge. The story of the family and the Korean people is recounted with the historical events of great import, such as the Donghak Peasant Revolution, the Japan-Korea Treaty of 1905, the First Sino-Japanese War of 1894, the 1909 Gando Convention, and the Japanese Invasion of Manchuria in 1931. It is a sizeable work in no fewer than 20 volumes, encompassing a period of a half century and six hundred characters.

The first part (1897–1908) centers on the fall of the Choi family, which is based on the events at Pyeongsa-li in 1894; as the family gradually declines and Jo Jun-gu, a distant relative, steals their money, Choi Seohui, the only descendant, moves to Gando with the village people. The second part (1911–1917) involves moving the background to Yongjeong in northeast China, were Choi Seo-hee and her sons take revenge on Cho Jun-gu— she marries Gilsang, a former servant, becomes rich again, and returns home.

In the third part, (1919–1929) the story centers around Yongjeong and in Tokyo, Seoul, and Jinju, with Kim Hwan dead in prison. where she has recovered the family fortune. Both the second and third chapters delineate independence movements abroad during the Japanese colonization, conflict within the Koreans overseas, and hardships that intellectuals experience.

In part 4, (1930–1939), Kim Gil-sang's release from prison, the completion of the altar portrait of Buddha, the death of Kihwa (Bong-sun), and the love and conflicts between Ogada Jiro and Yu In-Sil are slowly drawn, and the second generation Lee's son, Lee Hong and Choi Seo-hee along with the story of her two sons, Hwan-guk and Yun-guk growing up shows portrayals of the country's history, art, and culture.

In part 5, (1940–1959) the Koreans' suffering and waiting are depicted in World War II, and the major event is the love triangle of Lee Yang-hyun, Choi Yun-guk, and Song Young-kwang. The novel ends with Lee Yang-hyun running to Choi Seo-hee after hearing about Japan's unconditional surrender on the radio.

== Characters ==
The main characters are the family members of Deputy-Minister Choi: Lady Yun, her son Choi Chisu, and her granddaughter Choi Seohui. Also, there are Pyeongsa-ri residents who have connections with the family, the intellectuals, and those engaged in nationalist movements, such as Kim Gilsang and Kim Hwan. In particular, the author created fascinating characters like Ju gabi, Jo Byeongsu, Song Gwansu, Mohwa, and Mongchi who sublimate their hardships into love and show a strong will to live in such extreme realities. However, more negative characters, such as Jo Jun-gu and Kim Dusu appear, as well.

== Main themes ==
Land chronicles the Choi family's history spanning 50 years, from the latter era of the Joseon period to the end of the Japanese colonization. It is the chronology of the family and a historical novel that vividly depicts what the Korean people went through, but it is also a work of literature that explores human nature. The main characters who lead the story are Seohui, Gilsang, Weolseon, and Yong-i, but as the title "Land" suggests, the Korean history and society, or the Korean land can be regarded as its main characters and main themes. The collapse and resurgence of the Choi family actually signifies the fall and rise of the Korean people, and what Pak emphasizes through the whole story is the importance of loving kindness and cherishing life.

== Style ==
Instead of addressing real events specifically, the novel shows the course of history by describing individuals who struggle through the tumultuous times. Its first chapter tells the tragic history of Deputy-Minister Choi's family and the story of his death, an outbreak of a contagious disease, the death of Lady Yun, the plot of Jo Jun-gu, Yunbo joining militia, and the family moving to Gando, as it extensively delineates the development of the Modern Korean history. The second chapter, set in Gando, recounts the love, betrayal, and conflict between the characters with historical events such as the decline of Confucian values, the loss of farmland, and the fights against Japan. The third chapter is about Seohui in Hadong, the intellectuals based in Seoul, the activists fighting in Jirisan Mountain, and the refugees in Manchuria and Gando. The fourth chapter paints a realistic and extensive picture of the intellectuals based in Seoul, Tokyo, and Manchuria; the activists standing against Japan in Hadong, Jinju, Jirisan Mountain, and Manchuria. Lastly, the fifth chapter tells the remaining stories of the characters when the surrender of Japan is imminent. As such, the novel describes the story of the Choi family, closely following social changes in space and time. It realistically portrays the Korean history and ways of life, and incorporates dialect and proverbs to show the beauty of the Korean language.

== Critical reception ==
Toji received positive reviews from critics. The Korea Herald film critic Kim Seong-kon noted that the book "strongly appeals to Koreans because the country is still experiencing national and international turmoil that might cost it the precious things symbolized in the novel by the title word," while K. Connie Kang of the Los Angeles Times described it as "enthralling", and a "revealing portrait of the Korean condition." Toji has been translated and introduced into a number of languages, including English, French, and Japanese.

One of its important features is that it documents how the caste system of pre-colonial Korean society crumbled and how the Korean people suffered as a result of the Japanese coqnuest. While it exhibits a positive attitude towards the traditional, indigenous society, it also how it declined in favour of a new culture. In addition, it describes a history with the people as its agents.

It has been praised for 'cherishing life', which has been attributed as a 'major Korean value'. According to the Encyclopedia of Korean Culture, scene of Gilsang finishing the Avalokitesvara Bodhisattva statue illustrates "the value of cherishing life in this novel refuses materialism that oppresses life and supports love". It is about treating all living beings equally and acknowledging their own dignity. In Land, the human world is described as 'the valley of skeletons' swiped by an infectious disease, but it ultimately pursues hope as 'the tree of life' is growing there. Imi's mother gives birth to Hong-i in Pyeongsa-ri, where the disease spreads; the Korean people regain their lives with a pure heart after the defeat of Japan and the ensuing demise of the Japanese colonization.

== Adaptations ==
The novel led to many movie and TV series adaptations. The director Kim Su-yong adapted it into a 1974 film starring Kim Ji-mee, Lee Soon-jae, Seo Hui, Heo jang-gang, and Choi Jeongmin. The movie received the 13th Dae Jong Film Awards for Best Picture and Best Director, and Kim Jimi won Best Actress.

KBS created two TV series adaptations in 1979 and 1987, and SBS did one in 2004. The 1979 adaptation was created when TV was black and white and it was remade in 1987. As Pak was still writing the novel at the time, she was hesitant about adapting only its first part. But she eventually agreed, thinking it was meaningful. SBS started filming in 2004, after the novel was completed. In the 1979 adaptation, Han Hyesuk and Seo Inseok played Seohui and Gilsang, respectively. The 1987 TV series starred Choi Suji and Yun Seongwon and the 2004 remake starred Kim Hyeonju and Yu Junsang. The 1987 TV series was directed by Ju Ilcheong, the 2004 adaptation by Lee Jonghan. The TV series adaptations maximize the conflict, love, and hate depicted in the original so that they are interesting and touching in their own ways. One of the filming sites, the house of the Choi family in Pyeongsa-ri, later became a tourist attraction.

== Bibliography ==
- 《토지》, 삼성이데아서적, 1988 / Toji (Land), Samseong Idea Seojeok, 1988
- 《토지》, 지식산업사, 1988 / Toji (Land), Jisik Sanup, 1988
- 《토지》, 솔출판사, 1994 / Toji (Land), Sol Book, 1994
- 《토지》, 나남, 2002 / Toji (Land), Nanam, 2002
- 《청소년 토지》, 이룸, 2003 / Cheongsonyeon Toji (Land for Young Adults), Iroom, 2003
- 《토지》, 마로니에북스, 2012 / Toji (Land), Maronie Books, 2012
- 《청소년 토지》, 자음과모음, 2012 / Cheongsonyeon Toji (Land for Young Adults), Jamo Book, 2012
- 《만화 토지》, 마로니에북스, 2015
- Manhwa Toji (Land: Cartoons), Maronie Books, 2015

== Translations ==
- 土地, 福武書店, 1983. (Japan)
- 土地, 民族出版社, 2011. (China)
- 土地, CUON, 2016. (Japan)
- LA TERRE, Belfond(Paris), 1994. (France)
- Land, Kegan Paul International (London), 1996 (United Kingdom)
- LAND, Secolo, 2001. (Germany)
- Land, Global Oriental, 2011. (Netherlands)
- ЗЕМЛЯ, Новый хронограф, 2016. (Russia)

== Awards ==
Weoltan Literature Award (월탄문학상, 1972)
