= Organizations related to the Unification Church =

Sun Myung Moon, founder of the Unification Church, believed in a literal Kingdom of God on Earth to be brought about by human effort, motivating his establishment of numerous groups, some that are not strictly religious in their purposes. Moon was not directly involved with managing the day-to-day activities of the organizations that he indirectly oversaw, yet all of them attribute the inspiration behind their work to his leadership and teachings.

== Multi-faceted organizations ==
=== Collegiate Association for the Research of Principles (CARP) ===
The Collegiate Association for the Research of Principles (대학원리연구회, CARP) is a collegiate organization founded by Moon and his followers in 1955. It has been particularly active in Latin America. J. Isamu Yamamoto states in Unification Church: "At times CARP has been very subtle about its association with the Unification Church, however, the link between the two has always been strong, since the purpose of both is to spread Moon's teachings."

=== Universal Peace Federation ===
Universal Peace Federation (천주평화연합, UPF) is a non-profit focused on religious freedom.

=== Women's Federation for World Peace (WFWP) ===
The Women's Federation for World Peace(세계평화여성연합, WFWP) was founded in 1992 by Hak Ja Han, the wife of Unification Church founder Sun Myung Moon. Its stated purpose is to encourage women to work more actively in promoting peace in their communities and greater society. In 1993 Han travelled to 20 cities in the United States promoting the WFWP, as well as to 12 countries.

In 1995, the WFWP contributed $3.5 million to help Liberty University, which at that time was in financial difficulty. This was reported in the United States news media as an example of closer relationships between the Unification Church and conservative Christian congregations. Also in 1995, in what Antony Souza describes as a "grasp at respectability", former United States president George H. W. Bush was hired to speak at several WFWP events. Through his fee was undisclosed, it was reportedly "in the millions".

In 2009 it co-sponsored a "Leadership Conference" in Taipei. Taiwan's president, Ma Ying-jeou, spoke at the event.

=== International Conference on the Unity of the Sciences (ICUS) ===
International Conference on the Unity of the Sciences (ICUS) is a series of conferences formerly sponsored by the International Cultural Foundation and since 2017 by the Hyo Jeong International Foundation on the Unity of the Sciences (HJIFUS).

The conferences have been widely described as an attempt to improve the Unification Church's public image after attracting unwanted media attention for alleged abuse of its members. ICUS has made false claims about the attendance of several eminent scientists.

== Interfaith organizations ==
- American Clergy Leadership Conference (ACLC)
- The Peace Road is an initiative that promotes the "International Highway of Peace", Moon's globe spanning highway proposal, including a "tunnel of peace" across the Bering Strait.
- The Interreligious Association for Peace and Development (IAPD) is an interfaith association that represents different religious traditions from around the world. It was launched in November 2017 in South Korea.

== Educational organizations ==
- CheongShim International Academy
- International Educational Foundation.
- Paragon House, book publishing.
- The Professors World Peace Academy
- The International Association of Academicians for Peace (IAAP)
- Sun Hwa Arts School
- Sun Moon University
- Sun Myung Moon Institute
- The Unification Theological Seminary (UTS) is the main seminary of the international Unification Church. It is located in Barrytown, New York, and had an Extension Center in midtown Manhattan. Its purpose has been described as training leaders and theologians within the Unification Church, a role that has made it something of a "refuge from the even more frenetic and bizarre lifestyle of the average Unification Church member". Most of the UTS's students have been Unification Church members. Student life at UTS has been described by one former student as "frenetic, bizarre, and often contradictory". In 2003, the seminary had about 120 students from around the world, with most coming from South Korea and Japan, which have large numbers of Unification Church members.
- New Hope Academy
- New World Encyclopedia
- Several UC-related groups are working to promote sexual abstinence until marriage and fidelity in marriage.

== Arts-related organizations ==
- Kirov Academy of Ballet, dance school in Washington, D.C.
- Little Angels Children's Folk Ballet of Korea, a dance troupe founded in 1962 by Moon and other Unification Church members to project a positive image of South Korea to the world. In 1973 they performed at the Headquarters of the United Nations in New York City. The group's dances are based on Korean legends and regional dances, and its costumes on traditional Korean styles.
- Manhattan Center, Theater and recording studio in New York City.
- The Universal Ballet, founded South Korea in 1984, is one of only four professional ballet companies in South Korea. The company performs a repertory that includes many full length classical story ballets, together with shorter contemporary works and original full-length Korean ballets created especially for the company. It is supported by Unification Church members with Moon's daughter-in-law Julia Moon, who was the company's prima ballerina until 2001, now serving as General Director.

== Sports organizations ==
- Centro Esportivo Nova Esperança, Clube Atlético Sorocaba, Brazilian football teams.
- Peace Cup International football (soccer) tournament.
- Seongnam Ilhwa Chunma, South Korean football team.

== Political organizations ==
- Freedom Leadership Foundation, an anti-communist organization in the United States active in the 1960s, 1970s, and 1980s.
- Peace United Family Party, a South Korean political party founded by the Sun Myung Moon, one of whose main goals is the reunification of Korea.
- The International Association of Parliamentarians for Peace (IAPP), an NGO which recruits parliamentarians from different countries.
- TheConservatives.com, a former political website in partnership with The Heritage Foundation.
- The Summit Council for World Peace is an international group active in Moon's effort to unite North and South Korea.
- Coalition for a Free World, anti-Soviet group active in the 1980s.
- Washington Institute for Values in Public Policy
- CAUSA International is an anti-communist educational organization created in New York City in 1980 by members of the Unification Church. In the 1980s it was active in 21 countries. In the United States it sponsored educational conferences for evangelical and fundamentalist Christian leaders as well as seminars and conferences for Senate staffers, Hispanic Americans and conservative activists. In 1986 it produced the anti-Communist documentary film Nicaragua Was Our Home.
- The International Coalition for Religious Freedom is an activist organization based in Virginia, the United States. Its president is Dan Fefferman, who has held several leadership positions within the Unification Church of the United States. Founded in the 1980s, it has been active in protesting what it considers to be threats to religious freedom by governmental agencies, especially those which relate to the Unification Church.
- International Federation for Victory over Communism (IFVOC)
- Korean Culture and Freedom Foundation, a nonprofit organization which in the 1970s staged a public diplomacy campaign in the United States for South Korea In 1976, the US Justice Department investigated allegations that funds were being siphoned off of the KCFF to run an illegal influence campaign against American congresspeople. According to newspaper reports, as little as 8% of the organizations funds were used for charitable purposes.
- National Committee Against Religious Bigotry and Racism
- National Prayer and Fast Committee, which supported President Richard Nixon during the Watergate scandal.

== Businesses ==
The Unification Church controls a large number of businesses around the world. In 1997 David Bromley, a sociologist at Virginia Commonwealth University, said: "The corporate section is understood to be the engine that funds the mission of the church. The wealth base is fairly substantial. But if you were to compare it to the LDS Church or the Catholic Church or other churches that have massive landholdings, this doesn't look on a global scale like a massive operation."

The lines between the Unification Church's charities, businesses, religious activities, and related organizations is blurred with money and goods flowing between them. Money is in general believed to flow from East Asia to the United States although these flows are opaque. In the 1990s One Up Enterprises Inc. was the Church's primary American holding company. Business are owned by the Church through arcane corporate structures with many ultimately controlled by the holding company Unification Church International Inc.

- The International Association for Peace and Economic Development (IAED) was created and operates as one of the specialized UPF organizations.

=== Automotive ===
Pyeonghwa Motors is an automobile manufacturer based in Seoul, South Korea, and owned by the Unification Church. It is involved in a joint-venture with the North Korean Ryonbong General Corp. The joint venture produces two small cars under license from Fiat, and a pick-up truck and an SUV using complete knock down kits from Chinese manufacturer Dandong Shuguang. Pyeonghwa has the exclusive rights to car production, purchase, and sale of used cars in North Korea. However, most North Koreans are unable to afford a car. Because of the very small market for cars in the country, Pyeonghwa's output is reportedly very low. In 2003, only 314 cars were produced even though the factory had the facilities to produce up to 10,000 cars a year. Erik van Ingen Schenau, author of the book Automobiles Made in North Korea, has estimated the company's total production in 2005 at not more than around 400 units.

=== Health care ===
- Cheongshim Hospital, Korean hospital.
- Ilhwa Company, South Korean based producer of ginseng and related products.
- Isshin Hospital, Unification Church sponsored hospital in Japan which practices both modern and traditional Asian medicine.

=== Manufacturing ===
In South Korea the Tongil Group was founded in 1963 by Sun Myung Moon as a nonprofit organization which would provide revenue for the Unification Church. Its core focus was manufacturing but in the 1970s and 1980s it expanded by founding or acquiring businesses in pharmaceuticals, tourism, and publishing. In the 1990s Tongil Group suffered as a result of the 1997 Asian financial crisis. By 2004 it was losing money and was $3.6 billion in debt. In 2005 Sun Myung Moon's son, Kook-jin Moon was appointed chairman of Tongil Group. Among Tongil Group's chief holdings are: The Ilwha Company, which produces ginseng and related products; Ilshin Stone, building materials; and Tongil Heavy Industries, machine parts including hardware for the South Korean military. The Tongil Group funds the Tongil Foundation which supports Unification Church projects including schools and the Little Angels Children's Folk Ballet of Korea.

=== Shipbuilding ===
The Church owns Master Marine, a shipbuilding and fishing company in Alabama; International Seafood of Kodiak, Alaska; In 2011 Master Marine opened a factory in Las Vegas, Nevada, to manufacture a 27-foot pleasure boat designed by Moon.

=== Seafood ===
The Unification Church owns True World Foods, which controls a major portion of the sushi trade in the US. True World Foods parent company is the corporate conglomerate True World Group which operates restaurants and markets.

The Unification Church's foray into the seafood industry began at the direction of Reverend Moon who ordered an expansion into "the oceanic providence." In 1976 and 1977 the Church invested nearly a million dollars into the American seafood industry. Moon has declared himself the "king of the ocean." He also suggested that followers could get around the recently imposed 200 nautical mile exclusive economic zone by marrying American and Japanese members allowing the Japanese ones to become American citizens. He also declared that "Gloucester is almost a Moonie town now!"

=== Agriculture ===
The Church owns a chinchilla farm named One Mind Farms.

=== Media ===
News World Communications is an international news media corporation. It was founded in New York City, in 1976, by Sun Myung Moon. Its first two newspapers, The News World (later renamed the New York City Tribune) and the Spanish-language Noticias del Mundo, were published in New York from 1976 until the early 1990s. In 1982 The New York Times described News World as "the newspaper unit of the Unification Church." Moon's son Hyun Jin Moon is its chairman of the board. News World Communications owns United Press International, The World and I, Tiempos del Mundo (Latin America), The Segye Ilbo (South Korea), The Sekai Nippo (Japan), the Zambezi Times (South Africa), The Middle East Times (Egypt). Until 2008 it published the Washington, D.C.-based newsmagazine Insight on the News. Until 2010, it owned The Washington Times. On November 2, 2010, Sun Myung Moon and a group of former Times editors purchased the paper from News World.

- AmericanLife TV cable television network formerly owned by the Unification Church.
- The International Media Association for Peace was founded and operates as one of the peace associations of the UPF.

=== Real estate ===
In the 1970s the Unification Church of the United States began making major real estate investments. Church buildings were purchased around the nation. In New York State the Belvedere Estate, the Unification Theological Seminary, and the New Yorker Hotel were purchased. The international headquarters of the church was established in New York City. In Washington, D.C., the church purchased a church building from the Church of Jesus Christ of Latter-day Saints, and in Seattle the historic Rolland Denny mansion for $175,000 in 1977. In 1991 Donald Trump criticized Unification Church real estate investments as possibly disruptive to communities. As of December 1994, Unification Church had invested $150 million in Uruguay. Members own the country's largest hotel, one of its leading banks, the second-largest newspaper and two of the largest printing plants. In 2008 church related real estate investment partnership USP Rockets LLC was active in Richmond, Virginia. In 2011 the church related National Hospitality Corporation sold the Sheraton National Hotel. U.S. Property Development Corporation, real estate investment Yongpyong Resort, which hosted the alpine skiing events for the 2018 Winter Olympics and Paralympics.

== United Nations-related non-governmental organizations ==
From 2000 until his death in 2012, Moon promoted the creation of an interreligious council at the United Nations as a check and balance to its political-only structure. Moon's Universal Peace Federation is in general consultative status with the United Nations Economic and Social Council and a member of the United Nations Division for Palestinian Rights, a member of the UN Human Rights Council, a member of the United Nations Department of Economic and Social Affairs and United Nations Economic and Social Commission for Asia and the Pacific. Three of Moon's non-governmental organizations (NGOs) – Universal Peace Federation, Women's Federation for World Peace and Service for Peace – are in consultative status with the United Nations Economic and Social Council.

== Other organizations ==
- International Relief Friendship Foundation (IRFF)
- Joshua House Children's Centre in Georgetown, Guyana helps homeless and victimized children.
- Korean War 60th Anniversary Memorial Committee
- National Committee Against Religious Bigotry and Racism
- The New Hope East Garden Project (새소망농장), agricultural project in Brazil.
- Ocean Church
- Summit Council for World Peace
- Tongil Foundation
- World Media Association, sponsors trips for American journalists to Asian countries.

== Organizations which are supported by the members of the Unification Church ==
- American Conference on Religious Movements, a Rockville, Maryland-based group that fights discrimination against new religions. The group is funded by the Church of Scientology, the Hare Krishna organization, as well as by the Unification Church, which gives it $3,000 a month.
- American Freedom Coalition (AFC), a group which seeks to unite American conservatives on the state level to work toward common goals. The coalition, while independent, receives support from the Unification Church. American Freedom Journal was a publication of the AFC published by Robert Grant. The journal was started in 1988 and suspended publication sometime before 1994. Contributors included Pat Buchanan, Ed Meese, Ben Wattenberg and Jeane Kirkpatrick.
- Christian Heritage Foundation, a private, independent charitable foundation based in Virginia that distributes Bibles and Christian literature to Communist and Third World nations. In 1995 it was given $3.5 million by the Women's Federation for World Peace.
- Empowerment Network, a pro-faith political action group supported by United States Senator Joe Lieberman.
- Foundation for Religious Freedom (Also known as the New Cult Awareness Network), an organization affiliated with the Church of Scientology which states its purpose as "Educating the public as to religious rights, freedoms and responsibilities."
- George Bush Presidential Library. In June 2006 the Houston Chronicle reported that in 2004 Moon's Washington Times Foundation gave a $1 million donation to the George Bush Presidential Library.
- Geneva Interfaith and Intercultural Alliance, a Swiss association founded in 2008 under the patronage of the UN Mission of the Republic of the Philippines and the UN Mission of the Republic of Indonesia, and the Universal Peace Federation, offering programmes and intercultural training for diplomats, based on the Universal Peace Federation Ambassador for peace curriculum.
- Liberty University. Sun Myung Moon and his wife Hak Ja Han helped to financially stabilize the university through two organizations: News World Communications, which provided a $400,000 loan to the university at 6% interest; and the Women's Federation for World Peace, which indirectly contributed $3.5 million toward the school's debt.
- Married Priests Now!, is an advocacy group headed by the excommunicated former archbishop Emmanuel Milingo, who was himself married by Moon. MPN is a liberal Catholic organization calling for relaxing the rules concerning marriage in the Latin Church Catholic priesthood.
- Million Family March, 2000 rally in Washington, D.C., sponsored by the FFWPU and The Nation of Islam.
- National Conservative Political Action Committee (NCPAC), was given $500,000 by CAUSA International to finance an anticommunist lobbying campaign.
- University of Bridgeport of Bridgeport, Connecticut. In 1992, following the longest faculty strike in United States academic history, the University of Bridgeport agreed to an arrangement with the Professors World Peace Academy whereby the university would be subsidized by PWPA in exchange for control of the university. The initial agreement was for $50 million, and a majority of board members were to be PWPA members. The next University of Bridgeport president was PWPA president and Holocaust theologian Richard L. Rubenstein (from 1995 to 1999), and subsequently former U.S. HSA-UWC president Neil Albert Salonen (2000–2018).
- World Association of Non-Governmental Organizations (WANGO)

== See also ==
- Unification Church and politics
- Unification Church of the United States
