= Unification Church and politics =

Political activities and views of the Unification Church

Since its founder's start in advocating for the Korean independence movement, the Unification Church led by Sun Myung Moon has been highly politically active. The degree of involvement of the Unification Church, as well as some of its specific stances, have also been part of the reason for the movement's controversial status over the years. The belief in the establishment of a literal Kingdom of God on earth and church founder Sun Myung Moon's teaching that religion alone is not enough to bring this about provides a motivation for political involvement.

In the 1950s and 80s, the Unification Church set up media companies, research centers, and educational institutions that focused on anti-communist ideologies. The media heavily criticized them for possibly leading to nuclear war. The Unification Church also took part in politics, particularly concerning the reunification of Korea. Moon had links to conservative politicians, including members of the Abe family in Japan, leading to debates about the extent of the Unification Church's influence in political matters.

The Unification Church has distinct teachings on politics as depicted in its central book, the Divine Principle. The book argues that God-centered governance will eventually replace existing political structures. This is envisioned as a family-like structure with Moon serving as the monarch and being referred to as the "True Parent." The Unification Church teaches about establishing a “Kingdom of Heaven on Earth,” which would be a religious monarchy.

The Unification Church connections and activities in Japan was a subject of attention when a member of the Unification Church was implicated as the mother of the man who admitted to assassinating former Prime Minister Shinzo Abe in 2022. In the United States, the involvement of Moon's son, Hyung Jin Moon, in the January 6 United States Capitol attack.

== 1940s - 1960s ==
In the 1940s, before starting the Unification Church, Moon cooperated with Communist Party of Korea members in support of the Korean independence movement against Imperial Japan. After the Korean War (1950–1953), he became an outspoken anti-communist.

In 1964, he founded the Korean Culture and Freedom Foundation, a public diplomacy agency that promoted South Korea's interests and sponsored Radio Free Asia. Former U.S. Presidents Harry S. Truman, Dwight D. Eisenhower, and Richard Nixon were honorary presidents or directors at various times.

Moon viewed the Cold War between liberal democracy and communism as the final conflict between God and Satan, with divided Korea as its primary front line. Soon after its founding, the Unification movement began supporting anti-communist organizations, including the World League for Freedom and Democracy founded in 1966 in Taipei, Republic of China (Taiwan), by Chiang Kai-shek, and the Korean Culture and Freedom Foundation, an international public diplomacy organization which also sponsored Radio Free Asia. The Unification movement was criticized for its anti-communist activism by the mainstream media and the alternative press, and many members of them said that it could lead to World War Three and a nuclear holocaust. The movement's anti-communist activities received financial support from Japanese millionaire and activist Ryōichi Sasakawa.

== 1970s–1980s ==
In 1972, Moon predicted the decline of communism, based on the teachings of the Divine Principle: "After 7,000 biblical years—6,000 years of restoration history plus the millennium, the time of completion—communism will fall in its 70th year. Here is the meaning of the year 1978. Communism, begun in 1917, could maintain itself approximately 60 years and reach its peak. So 1978 is the border line and afterward communism will decline; in the 70th year it will be altogether ruined. This is true. Therefore, now is the time for people who are studying communism to abandon it." In 1973, he called for an "automatic theocracy" to replace communism and solve "every political and economic situation in every field". In 1975, Moon spoke at a government sponsored rally against potential North Korean military aggression on Yeouido Island in Seoul to an audience of around 1 million.

In 1976, Moon established News World Communications, an international news media conglomerate which publishes The Washington Times newspaper in Washington, D.C., and newspapers in South Korea, Japan, and South America, partly in order to promote political conservatism. According to The Washington Post, "the Times was established by Moon to combat communism and be a conservative alternative to what he perceived as the liberal bias of The Washington Post." Bo Hi Pak, called Moon's "right-hand man", was the founding president and the founding chairman of the board. Moon asked Richard L. Rubenstein, a rabbi and college professor, to join its board of directors. The Washington Times has often been noted for its generally pro-Israel editorial policies. In 2002, during the 20th anniversary party for the Times, Moon said: "The Washington Times will become the instrument in spreading the truth about God to the world."

In 1980, members founded CAUSA International, an anti-communist educational organization based in New York City. In the 1980s, it was active in 21 countries. In the United States, it sponsored educational conferences for evangelical and fundamentalist Christian leaders as well as seminars and conferences for Senate staffers, Hispanic Americans and conservative activists. In 1986, CAUSA International sponsored the documentary film Nicaragua Was Our Home, about the Miskito Indians of Nicaragua and their persecution at the hands of the Nicaraguan government. It was filmed and produced by USA-UWC member Lee Shapiro, who later died while filming with anti-Soviet forces during the Soviet–Afghan War. At this time CAUSA international also directly assisted the United States Central Intelligence Agency in supplying the Contras, in addition to paying for flights by rebel leaders. CAUSA's aid to the Contras escalated after Congress cut off CIA funding for them. According to contemporary CIA reports, supplies for the anti-Sandinista forces and their families came from a variety of sources in the US ranging from Moon's Unification Church to U.S. politicians, evangelical groups and former military officers.

In 1980, members in Washington, D.C., disrupted a protest rally against the United States military draft. In 1981, the Appellate Division of New York State Supreme Court ruled that the HSA–UWC was not entitled to property tax exemptions on its New York City properties since its primary purpose was political, not religious. In 1982, this ruling was overturned by the New York State Supreme Court itself, which ruled that it should be considered a religious organization for tax purposes.

In 1983, some American members joined a public protest against the Soviet Union in response to its shooting down of Korean Airlines Flight 007. In 1984, the HSA–UWC founded the Washington Institute for Values in Public Policy, a Washington, D.C. think tank that underwrites conservative-oriented research and seminars at Stanford University, the University of Chicago, and other institutions. In the same year, member Dan Fefferman founded the International Coalition for Religious Freedom in Virginia, which is active in protesting what it considers to be threats to religious freedom by governmental agencies. In August 1985, the Professors World Peace Academy, an organization founded by Moon, sponsored a conference in Geneva to debate the theme "The situation in the world after the fall of the communist empire."

== 1990s ==
In April 1990, Moon visited the Soviet Union and met with President Mikhail Gorbachev. Moon expressed support for the political and economic transformations under way in the Soviet Union. At the same time the Unification Church was expanding into formerly communist nations. After the dissolution of the Soviet Union in 1991 the Unification movement promoted extensive missionary work in Russia and other former Soviet nations.

In 1991, he met with Kim Il Sung, the North Korean President, to discuss ways to achieve peace on the Korean Peninsula, as well as on international relations, tourism, and other topics. In 1994, Moon was officially invited to the funeral of Kim Il Sung, in spite of the absence of diplomatic relations between North Korea and South Korea.

In 1994 the New York Times recognized the church's political influence, saying it was "a theocratic powerhouse that is pouring foreign fortunes into conservative causes in the United States." In 1998 the Egyptian newspaper Al-Ahram criticized Moon's "ultra-right leanings" and suggested a personal relationship with conservative Israeli prime minister Benjamin Netanyahu.

In 1995, the former U.S. President George H. W. Bush and his wife, Barbara Bush, spoke at a Unification Church event in the Tokyo Dome. "If as president I could have done one thing to have helped the country more," Mr. Bush told the gathering, "it would have been to do a better job in finding a way, either through speaking out or through raising a moral standard, to strengthen the American family." Hak Ja Han, the main speaker, credited her husband with bringing about communism's fall and declared that he must save America from "the destruction of the family and moral decay."

== 2000s ==
In 2000 Moon founded the World Association of Non-Governmental Organizations (WANGO), which describes itself as "a global organization whose mission is to serve its member organizations, strengthen and encourage the non-governmental sector as a whole, increase public understanding of the non-governmental community, and provide the mechanism and support needed for NGOs to connect, partner, and multiply their contributions to solve humanity's basic problems." However it has been criticized for promoting conservatism in contrast to some of the ideals of the United Nations. A scholar at the church's Unification Theological Seminary regards it as a rival to the UN's Conference of NGOs and part of a vision of an "alternative UN".

In 2003, Korean Unification Church members started a political party in South Korea. It was named "The Party for God, Peace, Unification, and Home." In an inauguration declaration, the new party said it would focus on preparing for the reunification of the South and North Korea by educating the public about God and peace. A church official said that similar political parties would be started in Japan and the United States.

Moon was a member of the Honorary Committee of the Unification Ministry of the Republic of Korea. The church member Jae-jung Lee had been once a unification minister of the Republic of Korea. Another, Ek Nath Dhakal, was a member of the 1st and 2nd Nepalese Constituent Assemblies, and a first Minister for Co-operatives and Poverty Alleviationu Ministry of the Government of Nepal.

=== Korean unification ===
In 1991, Moon met with Kim Il-sung, the North Korean President, to discuss ways to achieve peace on the Korean Peninsula, as well as on international relations, tourism, and other topics. In 1992, Kim gave his first and only interview with the Western news media to Washington Times reporter Josette Sheeran, who later became executive director of the United Nations World Food Programme. In 1994, Moon was officially invited to Kim's funeral, in spite of the absence of diplomatic relations between North Korea and South Korea.

In 1998, Unification movement-related businesses launched operations in North Korea with the approval of the government of South Korea, which had prohibited business relationships between North and South before. In 2000, the church-associated business group Tongil Group founded Pyeonghwa Motors in the North Korean port of Nampo, in cooperation with the North Korean government. It was the first automobile factory in North Korea.

During the presidency of George W. Bush, Dong Moon Joo, a Unification movement member and then president of The Washington Times, undertook unofficial diplomatic missions to North Korea in an effort to improve its relationship with the United States. Joo was born in North Korea and is a citizen of the United States.

In 2003, Korean Unification Movement members started a political party in South Korea. It was named The Party for God, Peace, Unification and Home. In its inauguration declaration, the new party said it would focus on preparing for Korean reunification by educating the public about God and peace. Moon was a member of the Honorary Committee of the Unification Ministry of the Republic of Korea. Church member Jae-jung Lee was a Unification Minister of the Republic of Korea.

In 2010, in Pyongyang, to mark the 20th anniversary of Moon's visit to Kim Il-sung, de jure head of state Kim Yong-nam hosted Moon's son Hyung Jin Moon, then the president of the Unification Church, in his official residence. At that time, Hyung Jin Moon donated 600 tons of flour to the children of Jeongju, the birthplace of Sun Myung Moon.

In 2012, Moon was posthumously awarded North Korea's National Reunification Prize. On the first anniversary of Moon's death, North Korean chairman Kim Jong-un expressed condolences to Han and the family, saying: "Kim Jong-un prayed for the repose of Moon, who worked hard for national concord, prosperity and reunification and world peace." In 2017, the Unification Church sponsored the International Association of Parliamentarians for Peace (IAPP)—headed by former Prime Minister of Nepal Madhav Kumar Nepal and former Minister of Peace and Reconstruction Ek Nath Dhakal—visited Pyongyang and had constructive talks with the Korean Workers' Party. In 2020 the movement held an in-person and virtual rally for Korean unification which drew about one million attendees.

=== Unification Church in Japan ===
The Japanese government certified the UC as a religious organisation in 1964; the Agency for Cultural Affairs classifies the UC as a Christian organisation. Since then the government was unable to prevent the UC's activities because of the freedom of religion guaranteed in the Constitution of Japan, according to Mitsuhiro Suganuma, the former section head of the Public Security Intelligence Agency's Second Intelligence Department.

According to historians, up to 70% of the UC's wealth has been accumulated through outdoor fundraising rounds. Steven Hassan, a former Unification Church of the United States member, engaged in the deprogramming of other UC members, describes these as "spiritual sales" (reikan shōhō, 霊感商法), with parishioners scanning obituaries, going door-to-door, and saying, "Your dead loved one is communicating with us, so please go to the bank and send money to the Unification Church so your loved one can ascend to heaven in the spirit world."

Moon's theology teaches that his homeland Korea is the "Adam country", home of the rulers destined to control the world. Japan is the "fallen Eve country". The dogma teaches Eve had sexual relations with Satan and then seduced Adam, which caused mankind to fall from grace (original sin), while Moon was appointed to bring mankind to salvation. Japan must be subservient to Korea. This was used to encourage their Japanese followers into offering every single material belonging to Korea via the church.

According to journalist Fumiaki Tada and other former UC followers, the conditions for Japanese followers to participate in the UC's mass wedding were substantially more difficult than Korean people, on grounds of "Japan's sinful occupation of Korea" between 1910 and 1945. In 1992, each Japanese follower needed to successfully bring three more people into the church, fulfill certain quota of fundraising by selling the church's merchandise, undergo a 7-day long fasting, and pay an appreciation fee of 1.4 million yen. For Korean people, the fee for attending the mass wedding was 2 million won (about 200 thousand yen in September 2022). Most Korean attendees were not followers of the church to begin with, as UC considered it was an honour for a Japanese woman to be married to a Korean man, like an abandoned dog being picked up by a prince. If the Japanese followers wanted to leave their partners of the mass wedding or the church, they would be told that they be damned to the "hell of hell".

In 1987, about 300 lawyers in Japan set up an association called the National Network of Lawyers Against Spiritual Sales (Zenkoku Benren) to help victims of the UC and similar organisations. According to statistics compiled by the association's lawyers between 1987 and 2021, the association and local government consumer centers received 34,537 complaints alleging that UC had forced people to make unreasonably large donations or purchase large amounts of items, amounting to about 123.7 billion yen. According to the internal data compiled by the UC which leaked to the media, the donation by the Japanese followers between 1999 and 2011 was about 60 billion yen annually.

=== Relationship between Abe's family and the Unification Church ===
Shinzo Abe, as well as his father Shintaro Abe and his grandfather Nobusuke Kishi, had longstanding ties to the Unification Church (UC), a new religious movement known for its mass wedding ceremonies. Known officially as the Family Federation for World Peace and Unification (FFWPU), the movement was founded by Sun Myung Moon in Korea in 1954 and its followers are colloquially known as "Moonies". Moon was a self-declared messiah and ardent anti-communist.

Nobusuke Kishi's postwar political agenda led him to work closely with Ryōichi Sasakawa, a businessman and nationalist politician during the Second World War. As Moon's advisor, Sasakawa helped establish the UC in Japan in 1963 and assumed the roles of both patron and president of the church's political wing, International Federation for Victory over Communism (IFVOC, 国際勝共連合), which would forge intimate ties with Japan's conservative politicians. In this way, Sasakawa and Kishi shielded what would become one of the most widely distrusted groups in contemporary Japan. Moon's organisations, including the Unification Church and the overtly political IFVOC, were financially supported by Ryoichi Sasakawa and Yoshio Kodama.

When the UC still had a few thousand Unification Church followers, its headquarters was located on land once owned by Kishi in Nanpeidaichō, Shibuya, Tokyo, and UC officials frequently visited the adjacent Kishi residence. By the early 1970s, Unification Church members were being used by the Liberal Democratic Party (LDP) as campaign workers without compensation. LDP politicians were also required to visit the Unification Church headquarters in South Korea and receive Moon's lectures on theology, regardless of their religious views or membership. In return, Japanese authorities shielded the Unification Church from legal penalties over their often-fraudulent and aggressive practices. Subsequently, the Unification Church gained much influence in Japan, laying the groundwork for its push into the United States and its later entrenchment.

Such a relationship was passed on to Kishi's son-in-law, former foreign minister Shintaro Abe, who attended a dinner party held by Moon at the Imperial Hotel in 1974. In the US, the 1978 Fraser Report – an inquiry by the US Congress into American–Korean relations – determined that, Kim Jong-pil, founder and director of the Korean C.I.A. an associate of Yoshio Kodama and from 1971 to 1975 Prime Minister of South Korea, had organized the Unification Church in the early 1960s and was using it "as a political tool" on behalf of authoritarian President Park Chung Hee and the military dictatorship.

In 1989, Moon urged his followers to establish their footing in Japan's parliament, then install themselves as secretaries for the Japanese lawmakers, and focus on those of [Shintaro] Abe's faction in the LDP. Moon also stressed that they must construct their political influence not only in the parliament, but also on Japan's district level.

Shinzo Abe continued this relationship, and in May 2006, when he was Chief Cabinet Secretary, he and several cabinet ministers sent congratulatory telegrams to a mass wedding ceremony organised by the Unification Church's front group, Universal Peace Federation (UPF, 天宙平和連合), for 2,500 couples of Japanese and Korean men and women.

On 8 July 2022 around 11:30 JST, a 41-year-old man named Tetsuya Yamagami, a former JMSDF member, shot Shinzo Abe and was immediately arrested and later confessed to local police. Yamagami stated that he held a grudge against the Unification Church and shot Abe because "the religious group and Abe were connected". Yamagami said he resented the fact that his mother was brain-washed by the religious group, and had gone bankrupt as a result.

Yamagami had been trying to kill Hak Ja Han of the Unification Church since around 2002, but he gave up because he could not get close to her, changing his target to Abe. Yamagami said that he "didn't have a grudge against Abe's political beliefs", but instead that he killed Abe because he believed the former prime minister had spread the religion to Japan. Abe and his family were known to have long-standing ties to the Unification Church, dating back to his grandfather Kishi Nobusuke; Abe himself had held speeches in support of the religious movement. According to research by Nikkan Gendai, 10 out of 20 members in the Fourth Abe Cabinet had connections to the Unification Church.

In spring 2021, the chairman of the UPF's Japanese branch, Masayoshi Kajikuri, called Abe and asked if the latter would consider speaking before an upcoming UPF rally in September if former US president Donald Trump also attended. Abe replied that he had to accept the offer should that be the case; he formally agreed to his participation on 24 August 2021. At the September rally, held ten months before the assassination, Abe stated to Kajikuri that, "The image of the Great Father [Moon] crossing his arms and smiling gave me goosebumps. I still respectably remember the sincerity [you] showed in the last six elections in the past eight years." Kajikuri claimed that he originally invited three unnamed former Japanese prime ministers, but was turned down due to concern of being used as poster boys for Unification Church's mission.

On 1 October 2023, the Japanese government began to pursue an attempt to dissolve the Unification Church in Japan. According to research by Nikkan Gendai, ten out of twenty members in the Fourth Abe Cabinet had connections to the Unification Church, but these connections were largely ignored by Japanese journalists. After the assassination, Japanese defence minister Nobuo Kishi, Abe's younger brother, was forced to disclose that he had been supported by the Unification Church in past elections.

== 2010s ==
In 2016 a study sponsored by the Unification Theological Seminary found that American Unification Church members were divided in their choices in the 2016 United States presidential election, with the largest bloc supporting Senator Bernie Sanders.

=== Splinter group controversy ===
After the 2014 founding of Rod of Iron Ministries, a splinter group from the Unification Church, Sun Myung Moon's son, Hyung Jin Moon publicly aligned with conservative politicians and far-right media figures. Moon espoused strong support for President Donald Trump during and after Trump's presidency. Moon endorsed the "big lie" that the 2020 presidential election was stolen from Trump. Moon and other members of Sanctuary Church participated in the 6 January 2021 United States Capitol attack. Moon faced no criminal charges from his involvement in the 6 January insurrection.

Hyung Jin Moon's church, World Peace and Unification Sanctuary Church in Newfoundland, Pennsylvania, gained national attention in early 2018 for holding a marriage vows renewal ceremony that asked participants to bring their AR–15 rifles. Hyung Jin Moon has likened the AR–15 rifles to the biblical "rod of iron". Neighbors of the church came out to protest the insensitivity of having the AR–15 rifles at the event so soon after the Parkland, Florida shooting that killed 17. To address concerns voiced by parents of an elementary school nearby, the Wallenpaupack Area School District relocated students for the day.

== 2020s ==
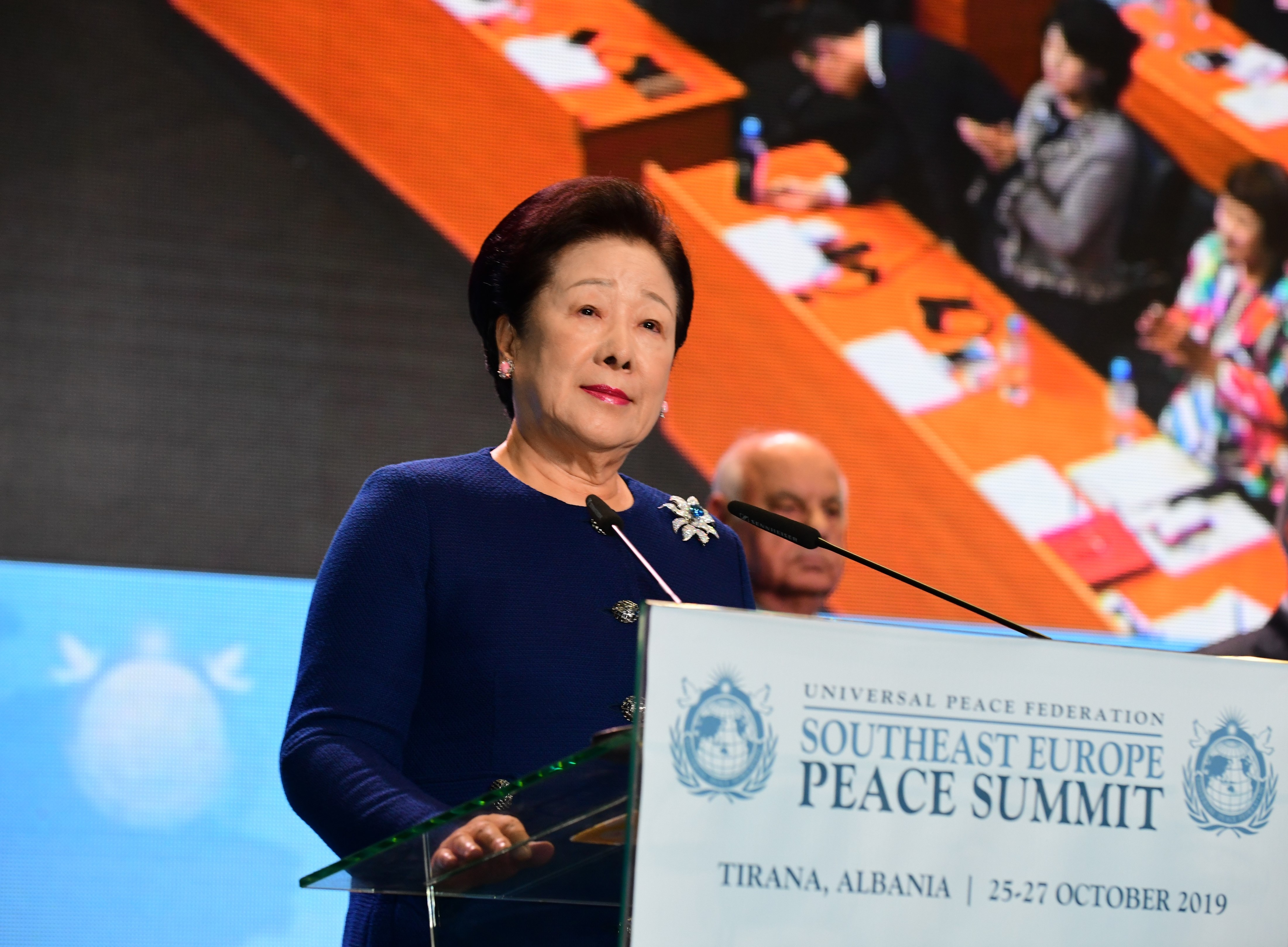
Unification Church leader Hak Ja Han was arrested in South Korea in September 2025

The conservative People Power Party (PPP) and the liberal Democratic Party (DPK) are embroiled in a political scandal involving allegations of receiving illegal political funds and gifts from the Unification Church. Hak Ja Han, the leader of the Unification Church, was arrested in South Korea in September 2025 on various corruption charges, including bribery and embezzlement. Also indicted in 2025 were Jeong Won-ju, who served as Han's chief of staff, and former World Headquarters Director-General Yun Young-ho. On 11 September 2025, the National Assembly approved a motion to arrest former PPP floor leader Kweon Seong-dong on charges of bribery from the Unification Church.

== Commentary ==
Michelle Goldberg: "Like most Americans, Wineburg had been unaware of the power Moon holds in our nation's politics. The reverend, who once served eleven months in prison for income tax fraud, is best known for marrying thousands of strangers in mass weddings. Those events earned him a public reputation as a spectacle-mad eccentric, but that obscures his role as a significant D.C. power broker. In fact, Moon is an important patron of the Republican Party and of the conservative movement."

Robert Parry: "Over the past quarter century, South Korean theocrat Sun Myung Moon has been one of the Bush family’s major benefactors – both politically and financially."

Richard Rubenstein: "I especially appreciated Rev. Moon's commitment to the fight against Communism. From his own first-hand, personal experience and out of his religious convictions, he understood how tragic a political and social blight that movement had been. I had been in East and West Berlin the week the Berlin Wall was erected in August 1961 and had visited communist Poland in 1965. Unfortunately, many of my liberal academic colleagues did not understand the full nature of the threat as did Rev. Moon. I was impressed with the sophistication of Rev. Moon's anti-communism. He understood communism's evil, but he also stood ready to meet with communist leaders such as Mikhail Gorbachev and Kim Il Sung in the hope of changing or moderating their views."

Thomas Ward: "With the Cold War's conclusion, a rush began amongst scholars, analysts, and pundits to identify the key personalities and factors that contributed to the Soviet Empire's collapse. Competing theories abounded, with key roles being assigned to Ronald Reagan, John Paul II, Mikhail Gorbachev, Norman Podhoretz, Alexander Solzhenitzyn and Sidney Hook, as well as to freedom fighters, refuseniks and populist movements such as Solidarity. In their interpretation of various events, some scholars opted to depersonalize the process, crediting the fall of the Soviet Union to phenomena such as evolving patterns of economic development and the information revolution. Among the contributions to the postmortem literature is Richard Gid Powers' Not Without Honor (1995), which professed to be "The History of American Anticommunism." Powers' 554-page opus of names and organizations omits all of the American entities associated with Reverend Moon, and denies them any role in rolling back communism in the 1970s and 80s. In the 672 pages of On the Brink: The Dramatic Behind the Scenes Saga of the Reagan Era and the Men and Women who Won the Cold War (1996), Jay Winik records a brief mention of one Moon-related organization, The Washington Times, but only in noting its early reporting on the unfolding story of Iran Contra. Accounts by Brian Crozier, Adam Ulam, Bob Woodward, and Jack Matlock, US Ambassador to the Soviet Union under President Reagan, also make no mention of Moon's efforts. Intentionally or not, Reverend Moon has been expunged from the record in spite of the adverse, critical coverage his activities received in the mainstream and alternative media when anticommunism was viewed with disdain."

== See also ==
- Baháʼí administrative order
- Christian democracy, a political movement blending social democracy, social conservatism, Catholic social teaching and Neo-Calvinist principles
- Christian Reconstructionism, a Neo-Calvinist theonomic movement
- Christian republic
- Christian state, an officially Christian country
- Deseret Nationalism, an associated concept within alt-right LDS groups online.
- Dominion Theology
- European values
- Family Peace Association
- Fascism
- Global Peace Foundation
- Islamic democracy, a similar concept used by some political Islamists
- Kingdom of God: Latter-day Saints
- Korean reunification
- List of Unification Church affiliated organizations
- List of supporters of the Unification Church
- Postmillennialism
- Religious pluralism
- Secularism
- Separation of church and state
- Theodemocracy
- The Washington Times
- Unification Church and North Korea
- Unification Church of the United States
- Velayat-e Faqih, a similar concept used by the Islamic Republic of Iran
- White Horse Prophecy
- Zionism
