= Unification Church funeral =

A Unification Church funeral (or seungwha) is a funeral ceremony for the purpose of aiding the deceased person's transition to the spirit world and to celebrate their life among family and friends.

Unificationist scholars writing on the church's funeral customs cite the Divine Principle which says: "Man, upon his death, after his life in the visible world, goes to the invisible world in a spiritual body, having taken off his 'clothes of flesh' (Job 10:11), and lives there forever." They also note that family and other human relationships continue after death. The Unification Church does not uphold belief in reincarnation or eternal damnation. Unification theologian Young Oon Kim writes:

You and I are going to live forever. What does immortality signify? We are thinking animals and loving creatures. Those two faculties show our kinship to the eternal God. They make us part of the infinite spirit world. We will think and we will love forever. Thus, our wisdom will continually grow and our love can be enriched more and more. This is what Swedenborg taught. There will be no sharp break between life here and life hereafter. What we start here continues in quality and expands infinitely. The ever living God creates each of us to have fellowship with Him forever.

The seungwha ceremony was introduced by Sun Myung Moon in 1984, at the time of the death of his son Heung Jin Moon. Members who had died prior to this were given traditional Christian funerals. When the new and more distinct format was ordained, the official church newspaper reported:

The use of the Chinese character meaning "Seung Hwa" is new and unique to this ceremony and is not commonly used. The character for "seung" means "ascending, elevation". The character "hwa" has meanings of "harmony and peace". The use of "seung hwa" was first instructed by Father at this time."

The ceremony itself consists of three parts: The Gwi Hwan Ceremony (or "returning to joy"), a farewell prayer service held by family members and close friends; the Seung Hwa Ceremony (or "ascension and harmony"), a public ceremony celebrating the person's life featuring songs, testimonies, and an address most often by a church pastor; and the Won Jeun Ceremony (or "returning home/to the palace"), the burial service. It is emphasized that the ceremony should have a joyful atmosphere since it is a celebration of the person's life and their transition to the spirit world. White and light colored clothing, rather than the traditional black, is worn by participants.

The body is buried in the person's holy robe, with a copy of the Divine Principle, and the coffin draped with the Unification Church flag. Cremation is discouraged in the Unification movement, although it is sometimes practiced especially in Japan where it is required by law. Unification Church cemeteries, or sections of existing facilities, have been established in South Korea, the United Kingdom and the United States.
