= Julia Moon =

- Hangul: 문훈숙
- RR: Mun Hunsuk
- MR: Mun Hunsuk

Julia H. Moon also known as Hoon Sook Moon (born Hoon Sook Pak, January 1, 1963) is the General Director of Universal Ballet in South Korea, and daughter-in-law of Sun Myung Moon, founder of the ballet company. She was the prima ballerina of the company.

== Biography ==
=== Early life ===
Julia Moon was born in 1963 in Washington, D.C., as Hoon Sook Pak. Her father, Bo Hi Pak, is a senior leader in the Unification Church and has been responsible for News World Communications (which published The Washington Times), CAUSA International, the Little Angels Children's Folk Ballet of Korea, and other church related organizations. At the age of ten, Julia Moon traveled to Korea to receive dance instruction with the Little Angels, which had been founded in 1962 by Sun Myung Moon. She performed as a singer and dancer with them. "At first, I was interested in gymnastics. Then I wanted to dance, but when I realized how much hard work it involved, I wanted to change. But my parents were very encouraging about me continuing with ballet," she said. She took courses in ballet at the Sun Hwa Arts School in Seoul, and subsequently received instruction at the Royal Ballet School in London and L'Academie de Dance Classique de Princess Grace of Monaco. She was a dancer with the Ohio Ballet, and the Washington Ballet; joining the latter in 1982.

=== Universal Ballet ===
After her fiancé Heung Jin Moon died in an automobile accident, Sun Myung Moon founded a dance company for her. She had been engaged to Sun Myung Moon's 17-year-old son, who died in 1984. She was previously known as Julia Pak, and was already a gifted ballet performer prior to the incident. "We had no definite date for a marriage but it was implicit that we would be together. Rev Moon had suggested us but we had made the decision," she said of her fiancé. In a ceremony, she was married to the spirit of Sun Myung Moon's son after his death, and became Moon's daughter-in-law. This was in accordance with Unification Church beliefs that only people who are married may enter into heaven. She had been performing overseas with the Washington Ballet, but was called back to the United States in order to be spiritually married to Heung Jin Nim. The marriage to her husband's spirit is believed to be "permanent and indissoluble".

She explained to The Evening Standard about marrying a deceased groom, "In Korean tradition, I've heard there are other cases of this kind of marriage. In our church, my case is the only one where it's happened this way. But even if this personal situation had not happened, the company would still have got started." Julia Moon commented to Dance Magazine on her relationship with her husband, "When I dance, I'm communicating with my husband. He's not here physically, but he's close in spirit." She stated she "had a son with Jin" through adoption of her sister's son. "I have an adopted son, aged eight. My husband's younger brother's family wanted to offer me their child," she said to The Evening Standard in 2000.

The Universal Ballet company of South Korea was founded to serve as a memorial to her husband. Universal Ballet of Seoul, Korea was founded in 1984, and the Universal Ballet Foundation, Inc. was started by the Unification Church in 1986. Located in Washington, D.C., the Universal Ballet Foundation, Inc. operates as a casting office for the Universal Ballet of Korea. The dance company was initially started by Bo Hi Pak and ballerina Adrienne Dellas. Dellas had previously served as a dance instructor for Julia Moon. Julia Moon's father served as president of Universal Ballet as of 2000; he was also chairman of the Korean Cultural Foundation. At its inception, Julia Moon was the primal ballerina of Universal Ballet. In 1986, Julia Moon performed as the lead ballerina dancer at a performance based on a Korean folk tale called Shim Chung, in a production at the Asian Games, Culture and Arts Festival in Seoul. Shim Chung went on to become a popular performance piece in South Korea.

In December 1989, Julia Moon made her debut with the Kirov Ballet in Leningrad in a performance of Giselle. To promote the performance, Sun Myung Moon took out a full-page advertisement in The New York Times. The ad featured an image of Sun Myung Moon. It also contained the text of an interview with Sun Myung Moon by a Soviet reporter, where Moon said the ballet was "an important moment in the development of my personal contact with the Soviet Union". Sun Myung Moon created the Kirov Academy of Ballet in Northeast for Julia, and recruited Oleg Vinogradov of the Kirov Ballet in Russia to serve as artistic director; Vinogradov was appointed to the role in 1998.

In 1990, the founder of the Washington Ballet Mary Day commented to The New York Times about Julia Moon, "She's a lovely, lovely girl, and a lovely dancer and person. We were sorry to lose her when she went back to Korea to start the company." As of 1990 the Universal Ballet company had yet to perform in the United States, but had hired guest performers from the U.S. at significant cost.

In a 1993 interview with Tulsa World, Julia Moon said of the art of ballet, "It's really a universal language." She spoke of Korean dancers versus other styles, "I think I would say that Korean dancers - those born and raised there - are very lyrical in their movements, more so than Japanese or Chinese or American dancers," she said. "It's probably something related to Korean folk dancing, which uses a very soft line and is very lyrical." In 1995, Julia Moon started her term as the general director of the Universal Ballet company.

The Universal Ballet company's first tour in the United States was in 1998. Julia Moon said that the company is separate from Sun Myung Moon, and that only herself and one other member are also members of the Unification Church. Approximately half of the administrative staff, headed by her father, Bo Hi Pak, one of Rev. Moon's chief aides, belong to the Unification Church. She said the company does not perform modern ballet styles, due to her view that the "classical form is the most beautiful form and therefore that's where our background is". She commented that she would like for the company to move in the direction of more contemporary pieces, "We really do want to know more of these contemporary modern works. I think we're ready for it. We need to expand artistically in that area, as well as keeping parallel with the classical tradition."

In 2000, Julia Moon was interviewed by The Daily Telegraph on her thoughts about being the general director of Universal Ballet. "I lack certain qualities, as a dancer and as a director. Sometimes I do wish I was a nobody, but because this company was formed on me, I feel that if I faltered or wavered the company would falter as well," she said. She commented in 2000 to The Evening Standard about homosexuality in ballet, "It exists in Korea, but since we started 16 years ago we haven't had any gay dancers. We just haven't had to deal with that issue."

In 2001, the Universal Ballet company performed Shim Chung in California. Julia Moon commented to The Press-Enterprise on the selection of Shim Chung as the performance piece, "We thought that this would be a good ballet to bring with us on this tour. We are very proud of it and we think that it is a very beautiful ballet. But beyond that I believe it demonstrates in the most convincing way possible that classical ballet and Korean literary and dance traditions can come together to create a new dance form, a blend in which each of the parts has its place." She to The Press-Telegram in 2001 that at this point Universal Ballet was judged more for its artistic merit than its origins, "People are now judging us by our artistry. The press is less interested in the connection with the church. The church has no role in the ballet company. I am a member of the church, as is one other dancer." In 2002, Julia Moon retired from her position as the star of the Universal Ballet company.

In 2004, the Universal Ballet company performed La Bayadère at the Sejong Center for the Performing Arts in Korea. "The ballet is known for its spectacle. It's mammoth, visually grand and one of the more exotic ballets in the repertory," explained Julia Moon. By 2004, she had become artistic director of Universal Ballet. In 2004, Bo Hi Pak was the chairman of the board of directors of the Universal Ballet company. According to the Long Beach Press-Telegram, "[Julia Moon's] role as general director had been at times overshadowed by the strong presence and energy of the Rev. Moon, and Pak, both of whom share a desire to create a world-class ballet company for Korea." In 2008, the Unification Church still gave financial support to the Universal Ballet company, and Julia Moon had a position on the company's board of directors.

In 2011, she received the Kyung-Ahm Prize.
