= Bo Hi Pak =

Unification Church member (1930–2019)

- Hangul: 박보희
- Hanja: 朴普熙
- RR: Bak Bohui
- MR: Pak Pohŭi

Bo Hi Pak (Korean: 박보희; August 18, 1930 – January 12, 2019) was a prominent member of the Unification Church. During the 1970s and 1980s, he was a major leader in the church movement, leading projects such as newspapers (notably The Washington Times), schools, performing arts projects, political projects such as the anti-communist organization CAUSA International, and was president of the Unification Church International 1977–1991. He was also the president of Little Angels Children's Folk Ballet of Korea.

== Life ==
Pak was a lieutenant colonel in the South Korean military when he joined the Unification Church in the 1950s. Serving church founder Sun Myung Moon as his main English interpreter during speaking tours in the United States, he was referred to in the media as Moon's "right-hand man" (or similarly), such as "Moon's top deputy".

He was the central figure in Moon's publishing businesses, including founding President and Publisher, The News World (later renamed New York City Tribune); founding President and Chairman of the Board, the Washington Times Corporation; and President, World Media Association.

In 1976 Pak incorporated True World Foods which became the largest sushi supplier in America.

In 1977/1978, Pak testified before the Fraser Committee in its investigation of the Unification Church, commenting: "I am a proud Korean – a proud Moonie – and a dedicated anti-Communist and I intend to remain so the rest of my life." In response to the adversarial investigation, Pak wrote Truth is My Sword. Alexander Haig commented in the introduction: "From the battlefield of the Korean peninsula to the halls of the U.S. Congress, Dr. Pak's speeches mirror the convictions of an individual whose ardent sense of justice has always been the cornerstone of his advocacy of personal freedom and democracy."

In 1984 Pak was kidnapped in New York City and held for ransom. The FBI arrested the kidnappers, who claimed that the crime was an attempt to change Unification Church policy.

In 1987 at a church gathering, a Zimbabwean Unification Church member who was thought by Moon to be the continuous "channel" on earth for his deceased son Heung Jin Moon, "beat Bo Hi Pak so badly that he was hospitalized for a week in Georgetown Hospital." The Washington Post reported that "Later, Pak underwent surgery in South Korea to repair a blood vessel in his skull, according to Times executives."

In 1994, Pak visited North Korea to attend the funeral of President Kim Il Sung, risking legal trouble by the South Korean government in doing so. In 1998 he visited again, leading a trade delegation representing Unification Church interests with the blessing of the South Korean government.

On July 20, 2004 the Eastern Seoul District Prosecutor imprisoned Pak and charged him with financial fraud because he was unable to repay his debts to Korean businessmen. In 2006, Pak was released on probation after serving 2 years and 3 ½ months. On November 6, 2006, he sent a letter to be distributed by Unification Church publications worldwide to give an account of his experiences in prison. In the letter he wrote:

Being able to live to the age of 76 was already a great blessing, but in my physical condition, I could not conceive how I would be able to serve time in prison until I became 81. I thought of John the Baptist 2000 years ago. He came with the mission to bear witness about Jesus but ended up dying in prison. I, Bo Hi, have lived with the conviction that I was born with the mission of John the Baptist for the time of the Second Advent. If it was my mission and destiny to die in prison in order to indemnify the failure of the first John the Baptist, then I was resolutely determined to solemnly receive my fate.

== See also ==
- Unification Church political activities
- List of Unification movement people
- Koreagate
- Subcommittee on International Organizations of the Committee on International Relations (Fraser Committee)
- The Washington Times
- True World Foods
- Unification Church of the United States
