= True World Group =

American conglomerate

- Company type: Private company
- Headquarters: New Jersey, United States
- Owner: UCI
- Parent: One Up Enterprises Inc.

True World Group process and manufacture high quality seafood products, own Japanese retailers, Sushi Stores, and supply high-end restaurants, hotels, and other fine food establishments with safe food products from around the world.

== History ==
True World Group started as a roll up of independent seafood and Asian food companies founded by entrepreneurs inspired by the late Rev. Dr. Sun Myung Moon’s Ocean vision. With the world’s growing population, Rev. Moon inspired a variety of oceanic-based activities to develop seafood supply and educate about the value of the ocean. Guided by this vision, True World Group expanded to produce high-quality seafood, own Japanese retail and sushi stores, and supply premium dining establishments worldwide with premium seafood.

== Subsidiaries ==
=== True World Foods ===
True World Foods is an American food service company. It is the largest supplier to the American sushi industry.

=== Hospitality and retail ===
The True World Group runs the Noble Fish and White Wolf Japanese Patisserie brands. Noble Fish began operating in 1984.

==== True World Restaurants ====
True World Restaurants runs Japanese restaurants.

==== True World Market ====
True World Market is a grocery chain.

== Operations ==
As of 2020 True World Group was headquartered in New Jersey.

== Ownership ==
As of 2006 the True World Group was owned by One Up Enterprises Inc. which was a subsidiary of UCI. At the time the Unification Church of the United States said that it did not have a controlling interest in True World.

== See also ==
- Bolton Group
