= Sun Myung Moon =

Korean religious leader (1920–2012)

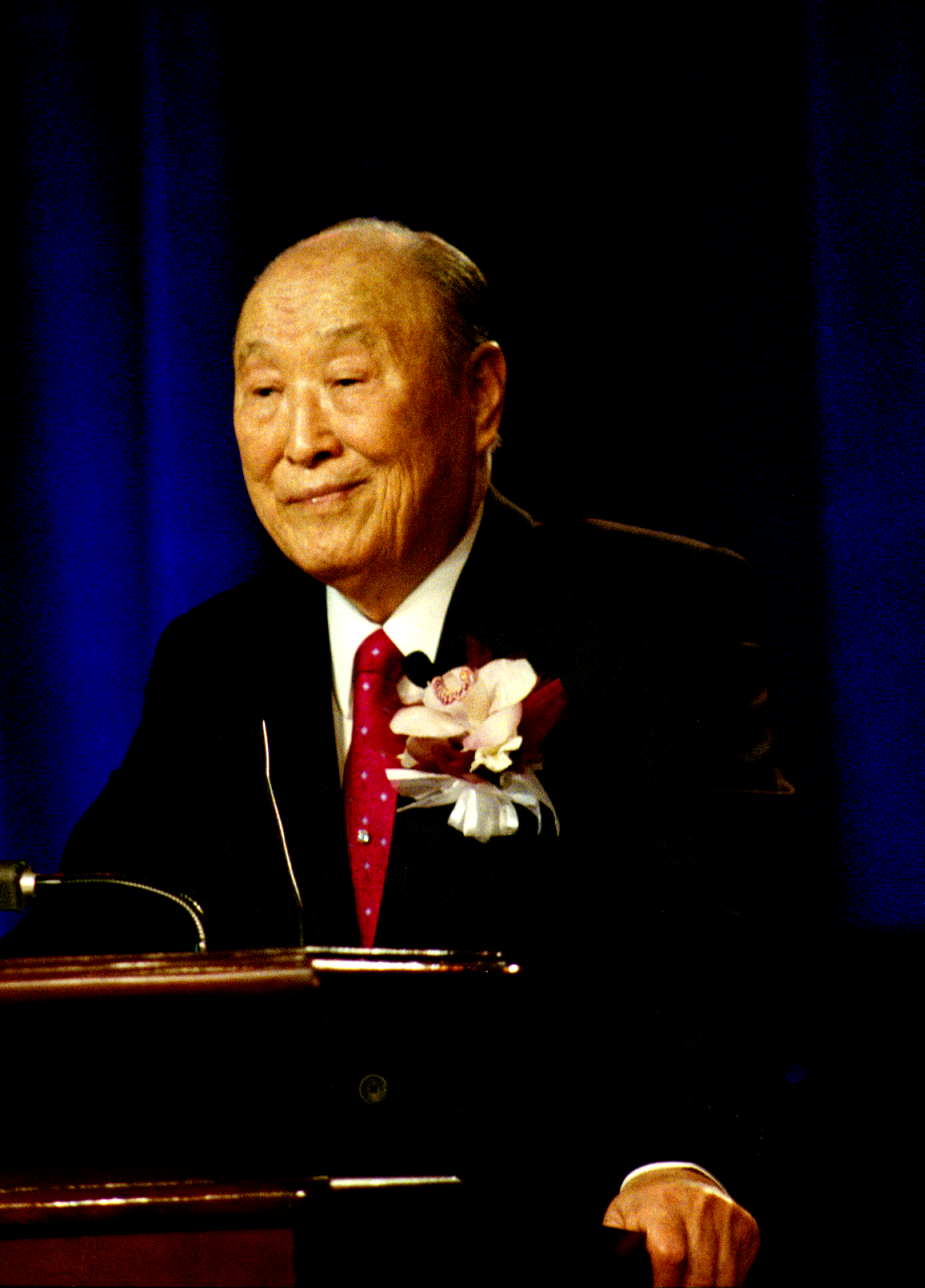
- Moon delivering a speech in Las Vegas, 2010
- Born: Moon Yong-myeong; 6 January 1920; Chongju, Heianhoku-dō, Korea, Empire of Japan (now North Pyongan Province, North Korea)
- Died: 3 September 2012 (aged 92); Gapyeong County, Gyeonggi Province, South Korea
- Education: Waseda University
- Occupations: Religious leader; businessman; media mogul; political activist
- Known for: Founder of the Unification Church and the Washington Times
- Spouses: Choi Sun-kil (m. 1945; div. 1957) Hak Ja Han (m. 1960)
- Children: 16, including: In Jin Moon; Heung Jin Moon; Un Jin Moon; Hyun Jin Moon; Kook-jin Moon (Justin Moon); Hyung Jin Moon (Sean Moon)

Korean name
- Hangul: 문선명
- Hanja: 文鮮明
- RR: Mun Seonmyeong
- MR: Mun Sŏnmyŏng

Former name
- Hangul: 문용명
- Hanja: 文龍明
- RR: Mun Yongmyeong
- MR: Mun Yongmyŏng

Sun Myung Moon (Korean: 문선명; Hanja: 文鮮明; born Moon Yong-myeong; 6 January 1920 – 3 September 2012) was a Korean religious leader, also known for his business ventures and support for conservative political causes. A messiah claimant, he was the founder of the Unification Church, whose members, popularly known as "Moonies", consider him and his wife, Hak Ja Han, to be their "True Parents". The church is widely noted for its "Blessing" or mass wedding ceremonies.

Moon was the author of his Unification Church's religious scripture, Divine Principle, and was an anti-communist as well as an advocate for Korean reunification, for which he was recognized by the governments of both North and South Korea. Businesses he promoted included News World Communications, an international news media corporation known for its American subsidiary The Washington Times, and Tongil Group, a South Korean business group (chaebol), as well as other related organizations.

Moon was born in what is now North Korea. When he was a child, his family converted to Christianity. In the 1940s and 1950s, he was imprisoned multiple times by the North and South Korean governments during his early new religious ministries, formally founding the Holy Spirit Association for the Unification of World Christianity, simply known as the Unification Church, in Seoul, South Korea, in 1954.

In 1971, Moon moved to the United States and became well known after giving a series of public speeches on his beliefs. In the 1982 case United States v. Sun Myung Moon, he was found guilty of willfully filing false federal income tax returns and sentenced to 18 months in federal prison. His case generated protests from clergy and civil libertarians, who said that the trial was biased against him.

His wedding ceremonies drew criticism, specifically after members of other churches took part, including the excommunicated Roman Catholic archbishop Emmanuel Milingo. Moon was also criticized for his relationships with political and religious figures, including US presidents Richard Nixon, George H. W. Bush, and George W. Bush; Soviet president Mikhail Gorbachev; North Korean president Kim Il Sung; and Nation of Islam leader Louis Farrakhan.

== Early life ==
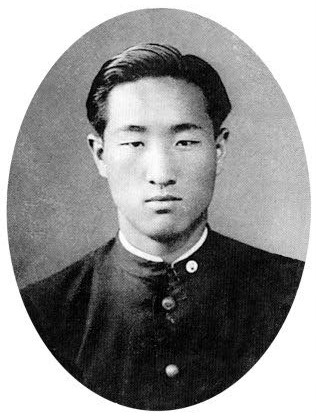
Moon as a student at Waseda University.

Sun Myung Moon was born Yong Myung Moon on 6 January 1920 in modern-day North P'yŏng'an Province, North Korea, at a time when Korea was under Japanese rule. He was the second son in a farming family of thirteen children, eight of whom survived. Moon's family followed Confucianist beliefs until he was around 10 years old. Then they converted to Christianity and joined the Presbyterian Church. Moon claims that he experienced a religious vision of Jesus at age 16 that laid out his life's mission.

In 1941, Moon began studying electrical engineering at Waseda University in Japan. During this time, he cooperated with Communist Party members in the Korean independence movement against the Empire of Japan. In 1943, he returned to Seoul and, in 1944, married his first wife, Sun-kil Choi (최선길; 崔先吉; Choe Seon-gil). They had a son, Sung Jin Moon (문성진; 文聖進; Mun Seong-jin). In the 1940s, Sun Myung Moon attended a church led by Kim Baek-moon, who influentially taught that he had been given by Jesus the mission to spread the message of a "new Israel" throughout the world. Around this time, Moon changed his given name to Sun Myung in an effort to quell the increased resentment of other Christians against him, as he gradually began gathering his own group of followers.

Following World War II, Korea was divided (South and North) along the 38th parallel into two trusteeships: the United States and the Soviet Union. Pyongyang (the eventual capital of North Korea) was the center of Christian activity in Korea until 1945. From the late 1940s, hundreds of Korean Christian religious figures were killed or disappeared in concentration camps, including Francis Hong Yong-ho, Catholic bishop of Pyongyang, and all monks of Tokwon Abbey. When Moon started his own movement (an early version of the Unification Church) in Pyongyang in 1946, the Soviet-controlled North Korean government imprisoned and, he claims, tortured him. Sources vary on the motivation behind his arrest: religious persecution, or a charge of espionage or polygamy. His religious practices during this time may have included unorthodox sexual rituals with multiple women, a claim the Unification Church denies and some scholars have doubted.

Arrested again in 1948, he was sentenced to five years at Hungnam labor camp, though in 1950, during the Korean War, he was liberated by United Nations troops and allegedly traveled by foot to Busan, (South) Korea. Moon emerged from his years in the labor camp as a staunch anti-communist. His teachings viewed the Cold War between capitalism and communism as the final conflict between God and Satan, with divided Korea as its primary front line.

In the 1950s, after years of being separated from his wife and child before reuniting, Moon and Choi divorced. Moon moved to Seoul once again and, continuing his ministry, was arrested two more times: once on suspicion of religious orgies and once for draft evasion; both charges were overturned.

In 1954, Moon formally founded the Holy Spirit Association for the Unification of World Christianity in Seoul and fathered an illegitimate child (who died in 1969). In the 1950s, Moon quickly drew young acolytes who helped to build the foundations of Unification-affiliated business and cultural organizations. In his new church, he preached a conservative, family-oriented value system and his interpretation of the Bible. A follower whose family joined Moon's movement in the early 1950s claims that she and Moon engaged in various religious sexual rituals, including with several other women, and that she remained Moon's mistress (through his second marriage) until 1964, bearing Moon another son, in secret, in 1965.

== Second marriage and Blessing ceremonies ==
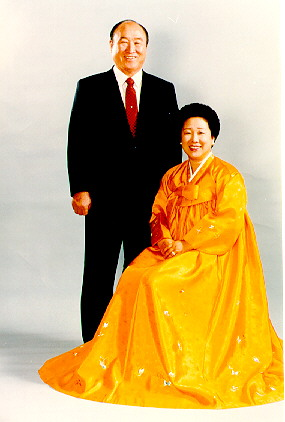
Moon and Hak Ja Han.

=== Marriage to Hak Ja Han ===
Moon married his second wife, Hak Ja Han (who was 17 at the time) on 11 April 1960, soon after Moon turned 40 years old, in a ceremony called the Holy Marriage. Han is called "Mother" or "True Mother". She and Moon together are referred to as the "True Parents" by members of the Unification Church and their family as the "True Family".

=== Blessing ceremonies ===
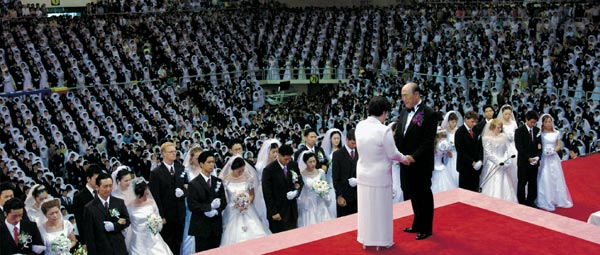
Moon presides over a mass blessing ceremony in 2010.

Although they initially lived communally, his followers gradually returned to the traditional Christian family form (monogamy). Blessing ceremonies have attracted attention in the press and in the public imagination, often being labeled "mass weddings". People who have never met, from completely different countries, were married by the Messiah of the Unification Church by "matching". They were informed that a certain person, specially chosen for him/her by the Messiah, would become their husband/wife. Some of them did not see their future partner until the day of the "marriage". Public mass blessing ceremonies followed. Some couples are already married, and those that are engaged are later legally married according to the laws of their own countries. Meant to highlight the church's emphasis on traditional morality, they brought Moon both fame and controversy.

36 couples participated in the first ceremony in 1961 for members of the early church in Seoul. The ceremonies continued to grow in scale; over 2,000 couples participated in the 1982 one at New York's Madison Square Garden, the first outside South Korea. In 1992, about 30,000 couples took part in a ceremony and a record 360,000 couples in Seoul took part three years later.

Moon said that he matched couples from differing races and nationalities because of his belief that all of humanity should be united: "International and intercultural marriages are the quickest way to bring about an ideal world of peace. People should marry across national and cultural boundaries with people from countries they consider to be their enemies so that the world of peace can come that much more quickly."

=== Establishing beliefs of the Unification movement ===
Moon said that when he was 16 years old, Jesus appeared to him, anointing him to carry out his unfinished work by becoming a parent to all of humanity. The Divine Principle, or Exposition of the Divine Principle (Korean: 원리강론; Hanja: 原理講論; RR: Wolli Gangnon), is the main theological textbook of the Unification movement. It was co-written by Moon and early disciple Hyo Won Eu and first published in 1966. A translation entitled Divine Principle was published in English in 1973. The book lays out the core of Unification theology and is held to have the status of scripture by believers. Following the format of systematic theology, it includes (1) God's purpose in creating human beings, (2) the fall of man, and (3) restoration—the process through history by which God is working to remove the ill effects of the fall and restore humanity back to the relationship and position that God originally intended.

God is viewed as the creator, whose nature combines both masculinity and femininity, and is the source of all truth, beauty, and goodness. Human beings and the universe reflect God's personality, nature, and purpose. "Give-and-take action" (reciprocal interaction) and "subject and object position" (initiator and responder) are "key interpretive concepts", and the self is designed to be God's object. The purpose of human existence is to return joy to God. The "four-position foundation" (Origin, Subject, Object, and Union) is another important and interpretive concept and explains in part the emphasis on the family.

Moon taught that Jesus was divine but not God; he was supposed to be the second Adam who would create a perfect family by joining with the ideal wife and creating a pure family that would have begun humanity's liberation from its sinful condition. When Jesus was crucified before marrying, he redeemed mankind spiritually but not physically. That task was left to the "True Parents"—Moon and Han—who would link married couples and their families to God.

== Move to United States ==
In 1971, Moon moved to the United States, which he had first visited in 1965, and eventually settled into a 35-room mansion on an estate in Irvington, New York. He remained a citizen of South Korea, where he maintained a residence. In 1972, Moon founded the International Conference on the Unity of the Sciences, a series of scientific conferences. The first conference had 20 participants, while the largest conference in Seoul, in 1982, had 808 participants from over 100 countries. Participants included Nobel laureates John Eccles (Physiology or Medicine 1963, who chaired the 1976 conference) and Eugene Wigner (Physics 1963).

In 1974, Moon asked church members in the United States to support President Richard Nixon during the Watergate scandal, when Nixon was being pressured to resign his office. Church members prayed and fasted in support of Nixon for three days in front of the United States Capitol under the motto: "Forgive, Love and Unite." On 1 February 1974, Nixon publicly thanked them for their support and officially received Moon. This brought the church into widespread public and media attention.

In the 1970s, Moon, who had seldom before spoken to the general public, gave a series of public speeches to audiences in the United States, Japan, and South Korea. The largest was a rally in 1975 against North Korean aggression in Seoul and a speech at an event organized by the Unification Church in Washington, D.C.

=== United States v. Sun Myung Moon ===
In 1982, following an IRS investigation, Moon was convicted in the United States of conspiracy and tax evasion by filing incorrect federal income tax returns totaling less than $8,000. He refused to stay in Korea and returned to the United States. His conviction was upheld on appeal in a split decision. Moon was given an 18-month sentence and a $15,000 fine. He served 13 months of the sentence at the Federal Correctional Institution, Danbury, before being released on good behavior to a halfway house.

The case was the center of national freedom of religion and free speech debates. Prof. Laurence H. Tribe of the Harvard University Law School argued that the trial by jury had "doomed (Moon) to conviction based on religious prejudice." The American Baptist Churches in the USA, the National Council of Churches, the National Black Catholic Clergy Caucus, and the Southern Christian Leadership Conference filed briefs in support of Moon. Many notable clergy, including Jerry Falwell and Joseph Lowery, signed petitions protesting the government's case and spoke publicly in defense of Moon. Carlton Sherwood, in his book Inquisition, stated that the conviction of Reverend Moon was viewed by Protestant pastors as a humiliation of religious liberty.

After his prison sentence, Moon began calling himself humanity's Messiah and officially conferred the title of "Messiah" on himself in 1992.

=== The Washington Times ===
In 1982, The Washington Times was founded by News World Communications, an international media conglomerate associated with Moon, which also owned newspapers in South Korea, Japan, and South America, as well as the news agency United Press International. The political views of The Washington Times have often been described as conservative. The Times was read by many Washington, DC insiders, including Ronald Reagan. By 2002, Moon had invested roughly $1.7 billion to support the Times, which he called "the instrument in spreading the truth about God to the world."

== Twenty-first century events ==
In 2000, Moon sponsored a United Nations conference that proposed the formation of "a religious assembly, or council of religious representatives, within the structure of the United Nations."

In 2003, Moon sponsored the first Peace Cup international club soccer tournament. The Los Angeles Galaxy, which competes in Major League Soccer, played in South Korea in the Peace Cup. During the event, Pelé, widely regarded as the best soccer player of all time and former Brazilian Sports Minister, met with Moon.

In 2009, Moon's autobiography, As a Peace-Loving Global Citizen (Korean: 평화를 사랑하는 세계인으로), was published by Gimm-Young Publishers in South Korea. The book became a best-seller in Korea and Japan.

By 2010, Moon had given much of the responsibility for the Family Federation for World Peace and Unification religious and business activities to his children, who were then in their 30s and 40s. In 2012, the South Korean press reported that Moon traveled worldwide in his private jet, which cost $50 million.

== Illness and death ==
On 14 August 2012, after suffering from pneumonia earlier in the month, Moon was admitted to Saint Mary's Hospital at The Catholic University of Korea in Seoul. On 15 August 2012, he was reported to be gravely ill and was put on a ventilator at the intensive care unit of St. Mary's. On 31 August 2012, Moon was transferred to a church-owned hospital near his home in Gapyeong, northeast of Seoul, after suffering multiple organ failure. Moon died on the morning of 3 September 2012 (1:54 am KST) at the age of 92.

A two-week mourning period was conducted in honor of him. On 15 September, after a funeral service attended by tens of thousands of Unification Church followers, Moon was buried at a church-owned mansion in Gapyeong.

== Activities and interests ==
=== Politics ===
In 1964, Moon founded the Korean Culture and Freedom Foundation, which promoted the interests of South Korea and sponsored Radio Free Asia. Former US Presidents Harry S Truman, Dwight D. Eisenhower, and Richard Nixon were honorary presidents or directors at various times.

In 1972, Moon offered predictions on the decline of communism, based on the teachings of the Divine Principle: "After 7,000 biblical years—6,000 years of restoration history plus the millennium, the time of completion—communism will fall in its 70th year. Here is the meaning of the year 1978. Communism, begun in 1917, could maintain itself for approximately 60 years and reach its peak. So 1978 is the borderline and afterward, communism will decline; in the 70th year, it will be altogether ruined. This is true. Therefore, now is the time for people who are studying communism to abandon it."

In 1980, Moon asked church members to found CAUSA International as an anti-communist educational organization, based in New York. In the 1980s, it was active in 21 countries. In the United States, it sponsored educational conferences for Christian leaders as well as seminars and conferences for Senate staffers and other activists. In 1986, it produced the anti-communist documentary film Nicaragua Was Our Home. CAUSA supported the Nicaraguan Contras.

In August 1985, the Professors World Peace Academy, an organization founded by Moon, sponsored a conference in Geneva to debate the theme "The situation in the world after the fall of the communist empire." In April 1990, Moon visited the Soviet Union and met with President Mikhail Gorbachev. Moon expressed support for the political and economic transformations underway in the Soviet Union. At the same time, the Unification Church was expanding into formerly communist nations. After the dissolution of the Soviet Union in 1991, some American conservatives criticized Moon for his softening of his previous anti-communist stance.

In 1991, Moon met with Kim Il Sung, then North Korean president, to discuss ways to achieve peace on the Korean Peninsula, as well as on international relations, tourism, etc. In 1994, Moon was officially invited to the funeral of Kim Il Sung in spite of the absence of diplomatic relations between North Korea and South Korea. Moon and his church are known for their efforts to promote Korean unification.

In 2003, Korean Unification Church members started a political party in South Korea. It was named "The Party for God, Peace, Unification, and Home." In its inauguration declaration, the new party said it would focus on preparing for Korean reunification by educating the public about God and peace. Moon was a member of the Honorary Committee of the Unification Ministry of the Republic of Korea. In 2012, Moon was posthumously awarded North Korea's National Reunification Prize.

In 2005, Sun Myung Moon and his wife, Hak Ja Han Moon, founded the Universal Peace Federation (UPF), an NGO in Special Consultative Status with the United Nations Economic and Social Council (ECOSOC). "We support and promote the work of the United Nations and the achievement of the Sustainable Development Goals."

Moon's projects have been lobbied in the National Congress of Brazil by Brazilian MPs. Moon has held dialogues between members of the Israeli Knesset and the Palestinian Parliament as part of his Middle East Peace Initiatives.

=== Business ===
Tongil Group is a South Korean business group (chaebol "Tongil" is Korean for "unification"; the name of the Unification Church in Korean is "Tongilgyo") founded in 1963 by Moon as a nonprofit organization to provide revenue for the church. Its core focus was manufacturing, but in the 1970s and 1980s, it expanded by founding or acquiring businesses in pharmaceuticals, tourism, and publishing. Among Tongil Group's chief holdings are: The Ilwha Company, which produces ginseng and related products; Ilshin Stone, building materials; and Tongil Heavy Industries, machine parts, including hardware for the South Korean military.

News World Communications is an international news media corporation founded by Moon in 1976. It owns United Press International, World and I, Tiempos del Mundo (Latin America), The Segye Ilbo (South Korea), The Sekai Nippo (Japan), the Zambezi Times (South Africa), and The Middle East Times (Egypt). Until 2008, it published the Washington, D.C.-based newsmagazine Insight on the News. Until 2010, it owned The Washington Times. On 2 November 2010, Sun Myung Moon and a group of former Times editors purchased the Times from News World.

In 1982, Moon sponsored the film Inchon, a historical drama about the Battle of Inchon during the Korean War. It was not successful critically or financially and was criticized for its unfair treatment of the North Korean government.

In 1989, Moon founded Seongnam Ilhwa Chunma, the second most successful soccer club in South Korea, having won a record 7 league titles, 2 FA Cups, 3 League Cups, and 2 AFC Champions League titles. Seongnam's record was beaten by Jeonbuk Hyundai Motors in 2020.

The church is the largest owner of US sushi restaurants, and in the Kodiak region of Alaska is the area's largest employer. The church founded the first currently operating automobile manufacturing plant in North Korea, Pyeonghwa Motors, and is the second largest exporter of Korean goods.

In 2011, construction of the $18 million Yeosu Expo Hotel was completed; the hotel is located at the Moon-owned Ocean Resort in Yeosu, the venue of Expo 2012. The opening ceremony was attended by the governor of the province. Another one, the Ocean Hotel, was completed in February 2012. Moon-owned Yeongpyeong Resort, Ocean Resort, and Pineridge Resort were scheduled to host Expo 2012, the 2018 Winter Olympics, and Formula 1. Moon also managed the FIFA-accredited Peace Cup. The FIFA itself has funded more than $2 million for the Peace Cup since 2003.

=== Race relations ===
Moon took a strong stance against racism and racial discrimination. In 1974, he urged Unification Church members to support an African-American president of the United States: "We have had enough of white presidents. So, let's this time elect a president from the Negro race. What will you do if I say so? There's no question there. We must never forget that we are brothers and sisters in a huge human family. In any level of community, we must become like a family."

In 1981, he said that he himself was a victim of racial prejudice in the United States (concerning his prosecution on tax charges in United States v. Sun Myung Moon), saying: "I would not be standing here today if my skin were white or my religion was Presbyterian. I am here today only because my skin is yellow and my religion is the Unification Church. The ugliest things in this beautiful country of America are religious bigotry and racism."

Several African American organizations and individuals spoke out in defense of Moon at this time, including the National Black Catholic Clergy Caucus, the Southern Christian Leadership Conference, the National Conference of Black Mayors, and Joseph Lowery, who was then the head of the Southern Christian Leadership Conference.

In a later controversy over the use of the word "Moonie" (which was said to be offensive) by the American news media, Moon's position was supported by civil rights activists Ralph Abernathy and James Bevel.

In 2000, Moon and Nation of Islam leader Louis Farrakhan got together to sponsor the Million Family March, a rally in Washington, D.C. to celebrate family unity and racial and religious harmony as well as to address other issues, including abortion, capital punishment, health care, education, welfare, Social Security reform, substance abuse prevention, and overhaul of the World Bank and International Monetary Fund. In his keynote speech, Farrakhan called for racial harmony.

=== Dance ===
In 1962, Moon and other church members founded the Little Angels Children's Folk Ballet of Korea, a children's dance troupe that presents traditional Korean folk dances. He said that this was to project a positive image of South Korea to the world. In 1984, Moon founded the $8 million Universal Ballet project, with Soviet-born Oleg Vinogradov as its art director and Moon's daughter-in-law Julia as its prima ballerina. It was described by The New York Times as the top ballet company in Asia. In 1989, Moon founded Universal Ballet Academy, which later changed its name to Kirov Academy of Ballet, in Washington, D.C.

=== Seafood and shipbuilding ===
The Unification Church owns True World Foods, which controls a major portion of the sushi trade in the US. True World Foods' parent company is the corporate conglomerate True World Group, which operates restaurants and markets.

The Unification Church's entry into the seafood industry began at the direction of Moon, who ordered an expansion into "the oceanic providence." In 1976 and 1977, the Unification Church invested nearly a million dollars into the American seafood industry. Moon delivered a speech in 1980 entitled "The Way of Tuna", in which he claimed that "After we build the boats, we catch the fish and process them for the market, and then have a distribution network. This is not just on the drawing board; I have already done it" and declared himself the "king of the ocean." He also suggested that they could get around the recently imposed 200-nautical-mile exclusive economic zone by marrying American and Japanese members, allowing the Japanese ones to become American citizens, because once married, "we are not foreigners; therefore Japanese brothers, particularly those matched to Americans, are becoming ... leaders for fishing and distribution." He also declared that "Gloucester is almost a Moonie town now!"

Later in 1980, Moon gave a sermon in which he said, "This ocean business is really reserved for Unification Church. How much income would this business generate? Roughly speaking, enough money to buy the entire world. That's true! It has unlimited potential." In 1986, he advised his followers to open a thousand restaurants in America.

The Unification Church owns Master Marine (a shipbuilding and fishing company in Alabama) and International Seafood of Kodiak, Alaska. In 2011, Master Marine opened a factory in Las Vegas, Nevada, to manufacture a 27-foot pleasure boat designed by Moon.

== Honorary degrees and other recognition ==
Moon held honorary degrees from more than ten universities and colleges worldwide, at least one of which, the University of Bridgeport, received significant funding from his organizations. He was a member of the Honorary Committee of the Unification Ministry of South Korea. In 1985, he and his wife received Doctor of Divinity degrees from Shaw University.

In 2004, Moon was honored as the Messiah at an event in the Dirksen Senate Office Building, Washington, D.C. This attracted much public attention and was criticized by The New York Times and The Washington Post as a possible violation of the principle of separation of church and state in the United States. Some of the political figures who had attended the event later told reporters that they had been misled as to its nature.

Several months after his death, an award named after him and his wife (the Sunhak Peace Prize) was proposed, inheriting his will to "recognize and empower innovations in human development, conflict resolution, and ecological conservation." Its laureates receive a certificate, a medal, and $1 million.

Moon was posthumously awarded North Korea's National Reunification Prize in 2012 and a meritorious award by K-League. On the first anniversary of Moon's death, North Korean leader Kim Jong Un expressed condolences to Han and the family, saying: "Kim Jong Un prayed for the repose of Moon, who worked hard for national concord, prosperity and reunification and world peace."

In 2013, Zimbabwean Prime Minister Morgan Tsvangirai stated: "I remain greatly inspired by people like Reverend Dr. Sun Myung Moon, whose work and life across continents continue to impact positively on the lives of millions of others in the world."

In 2021, president Donald Trump praised Moon in an event linked to the Unification Church. Previously, such events held by Unification Church, named Rally of Hope, gathered speakers from the Trump Administration: e.g., former Vice President Mike Pence, former Secretary of State Mike Pompeo, and advisor Paula White.

== Criticism ==
Moon's claim to be the Messiah and the Second Coming of Christ has been rejected by most Jewish and Christian scholars. The Divine Principle was labeled as heretical by Protestant churches in South Korea, including Moon's own Presbyterian Church. In the United States, it was rejected by ecumenical organizations as being non-Christian. Protestant commentators have also criticized Moon's teachings as being contrary to the Protestant doctrine of salvation by faith alone. In their influential book The Kingdom of the Cults (first published in 1965), Walter Ralston Martin and Ravi K. Zacharias disagreed with the Divine Principle on the issues of the divinity of Christ, the virgin birth of Jesus, Moon's belief that Jesus should have married, the necessity of the crucifixion of Jesus, a literal resurrection of Jesus, as well as a literal second coming of Jesus. Commentators have criticized the Divine Principle for saying that the First World War, the Second World War, the Holocaust, and the Cold War served as indemnity conditions to prepare the world for the establishment of the Kingdom of God.

During the Cold War, Moon was criticized by both the mainstream media and the alternative media for his anti-communist activism, which many said could lead to World War III and a nuclear holocaust. Moon's anti-communist activities received financial support from controversial Japanese millionaire and activist Ryōichi Sasakawa. In 1977, the Subcommittee on International Organizations of the Committee on International Relations of the United States House of Representatives, while investigating the Koreagate scandal, found that the South Korean National Intelligence Service (KCIA) had worked with the Unification Church to gain political influence within the United States, with some members working as volunteers in Congressional offices. Together, they founded the Korean Cultural Freedom Foundation, a nonprofit organization that undertook public diplomacy for the Republic of Korea. The committee also investigated possible KCIA influence on Moon's campaign in support of Richard Nixon. After the dissolution of the Soviet Union in 1991, some American conservatives criticized Moon for his softening of his previous anti-communist stance.

In the 1990s, when Moon began to offer the Unification marriage blessing ceremony to members of other churches and religions, he was criticized for creating possible confusion. In 1998, journalist Peter Maass, writing for The New Yorker, reported that some Unification members were dismayed and also grumbled when Moon extended the Blessing to non-members, who had not gone through the same course that members had. In 2001, Moon came into conflict with the Roman Catholic Church when 71-year-old Catholic archbishop Emmanuel Milingo and Maria Sung, a 43-year-old Korean acupuncturist, married in a blessing ceremony, presided over by Moon and his wife. Following his marriage, the archbishop was called to the Vatican by Pope John Paul II, where he was asked not to see his wife anymore and to move to a Capuchin monastery. Sung went on a hunger strike to protest their separation. This attracted much media attention. Milingo is now an advocate of the removal of the requirement for celibacy by priests in the Catholic Church. He is the founder of the Married Priests Now! advocacy group.

In 1998, the Egyptian newspaper Al-Ahram criticized Moon's possible relationship with Israeli Prime Minister Benjamin Netanyahu and wrote that The Washington Times editorial policy was "rabidly anti-Arab, anti-Muslim and pro-Israel."

In 2000, Moon was criticized, including by some members of his church, for his support of controversial Nation of Islam leader Louis Farrakhan's Million Family March. Moon was also criticized for his relationship with controversial Jewish scholar Richard L. Rubenstein, an advocate of the "death of God theology" of the 1960s. Rubenstein was a defender of the Unification Church and served on its advisory council, and on the board of directors of The Washington Times, a church-owned newspaper. In the 1990s, he served as president of the University of Bridgeport, which was then affiliated with the church.

In 2003, George D. Chryssides of the University of Wolverhampton criticized Moon for introducing doctrines that tended to divide the Christian church rather than uniting it, which was his stated purpose in founding the Unification movement (originally named the Holy Spirit Association for the Unification of World Christianity). In his 2009 autobiography, Moon himself wrote that he did not originally intend on founding a separate denomination.

Moon opposed homosexuality and compared gay people to "dirty dung-eating dogs". He said that "gays will be eliminated" in a "purge on God's orders".

In 2009, Moon's support for the Japan-Korea Undersea Tunnel was criticized in Japan and South Korea as a possible threat to both nations' interests and national identities.

Other criticisms include Moon's apparent neglect of his wife, Hak Ja Han, and his appointments of their children and their spouses to leadership positions in the church and related businesses, including their daughter In Jin Moon to the presidency of the Unification Church of the United States against the wishes of some church members; his support of conservatives within the government of South Korea; his assignment of movement members and resources to business projects and political activism, including The Washington Times; as well as the relationship between the Unification Church and Islam, especially following the September 11 attacks in New York City.

== Views of Moon by his followers ==
The Divine Principle itself says about Moon: "With the fullness of time, God has sent one person to this earth to resolve the fundamental problems of human life and the universe. His name is Sun Myung Moon. For several decades he wandered through the spirit world so vast as to be beyond imagining. He trod a bloody path of suffering in search of the truth, passing through tribulations that God alone remembers. Since he understood that no one can find the ultimate truth to save humanity without first passing through the bitterest of trials, he fought alone against millions of devils, both in the spiritual and physical worlds, and triumphed over them all. Through intimate spiritual communion with God and by meeting with Jesus and many saints in Paradise, he brought to light all the secrets of Heaven."

In 1978, Rodney Sawatsky wrote in an article in Theology Today: "Why trust Rev. Moon's dreams and visions of the new age and his role in it, we ask? Most converts actually have had minimal contact with him. Frederick Sontag (Sun Myung Moon and the Unification Church, Abingdon, 1977), in his interviews with Moon, appears to have found a pleasant but not overwhelming personality. Charisma, as traditionally understood, seems hardly applicable here. Rather, Moon provides a model. He suffered valiantly, he knows confidently, he prays assuredly, and he lives lovingly, say his followers. The Divine Principle is not an unrealizable ideal; it is incarnate in a man, it lives, it is imitable. His truth is experienced to be their truth. His explanation of the universe becomes their understanding of themselves and the world in which they live."

In 1980, sociologist Irving Louis Horowitz commented: "The Reverend Moon is a fundamentalist with a vengeance. He has a belief system that admits of no boundaries or limits, an all-embracing truth. His writings exhibit a holistic concern for the person, society, nature, and all things embraced by the human vision. In this sense the concept underwriting the Unification Church is apt, for its primary drive and appeal is unity, urging a paradigm of the essence in an overly complicated world of existence. It is a ready-made doctrine for impatient young people and all those for whom the pursuit of the complex has become a tiresome and fruitless venture."

In 1998, investigative journalist Peter Maass wrote in an article in The New Yorker: "There are, certainly, differing degrees of devotion among Moon's followers; the fact that they bow at the right moment or shout Mansei! in unison doesn't mean they believe everything Moon says, or do precisely what he commands. Even on important issues, like Moon's claiming to be the messiah, there are church members whom I met, including a close aide to Moon, who demur. A religious leader whom they respect and whose theology they believe, yes; the messiah, perhaps not."

In his 2004 book The New Religious Movement Experience in America, Eugene V. Gallagher wrote: "The Divine Principle's analysis of the Fall sets the stage for the mission of Rev. Moon, who in the last days brings a revelation that offers humankind the chance to return to an Edenic state. The account in the Divine Principle offers Unificationists a comprehensive context for understanding human suffering."

== See also ==
- List of Ig Nobel Prize winners
- List of messiah claimants
- List of Unification movement people
- Media proprietor
- Messiah complex
- New religious movement
