= Little Angels Children's Folk Ballet of Korea =

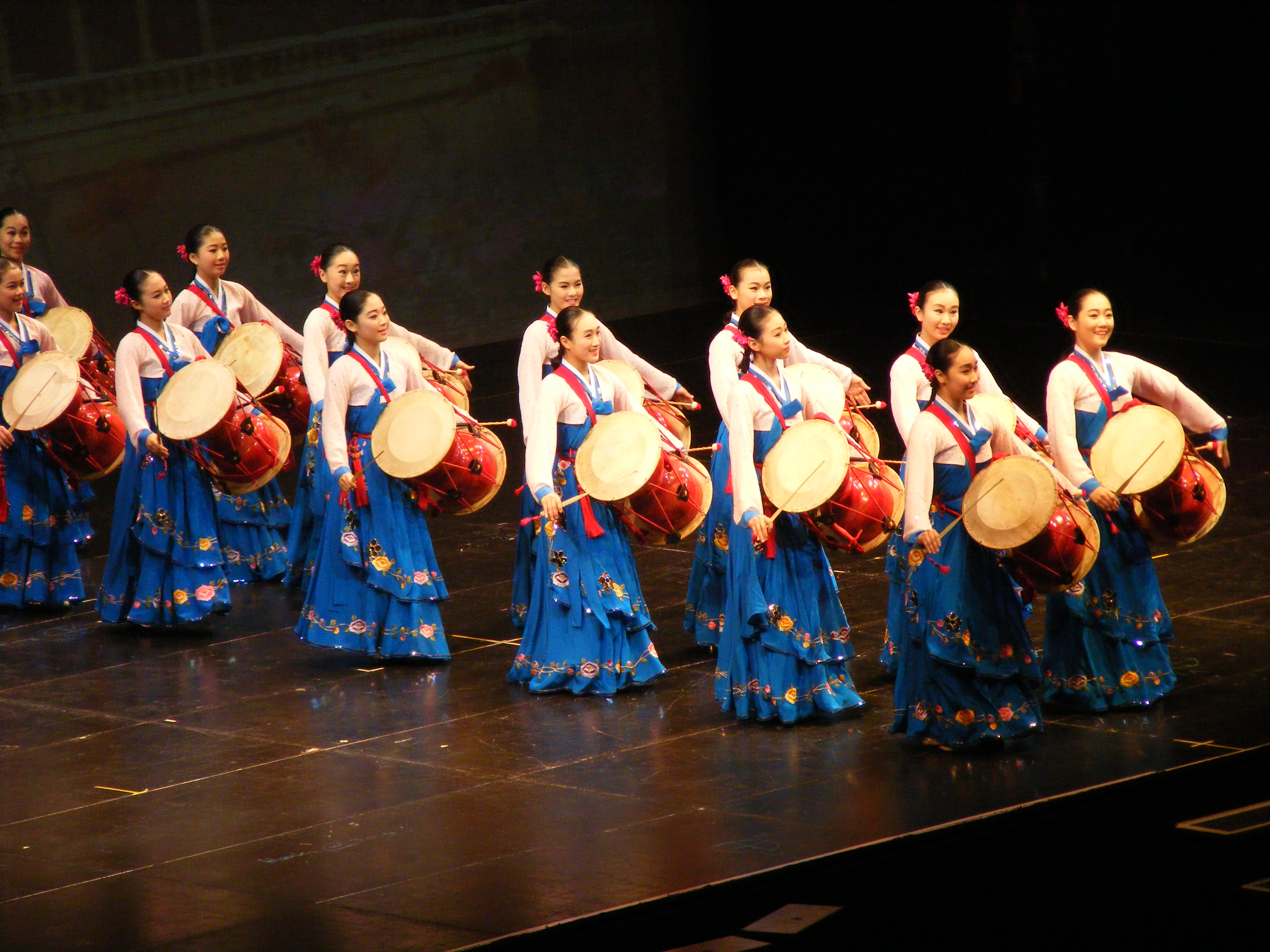

General information
- Name: Little Angels Children's Folk Ballet of Korea
- Year founded: May 5, 1962
- Founders: Dr. Sun Myung Moon & Dr. Hak Ja Han Moon
- Website: http://www.littleangels.or.kr/

Senior staff
- Chief executive: Julia H. Moon
- Executive director: Imsoon Jung

Artistic staff
- Artistic director: Bae Jung-hye

Other
- Official school: Sunhwa Arts School

The Little Angels Children's Folk Ballet of Korea (Korean: 리틀엔젤스예술단) is a South Korean traditional art and dance troupe made up of elementary and middle school children, founded in 1962 by Sun Myung Moon, the founder of the Unification Church, to project a positive image of South Korea to the world. In 1973 they performed at the United Nations Headquarters in New York City. The group's dances are based on Korean legends and regional dances, and its costumes on traditional Korean styles. Choral singing by the troupe in many languages is also featured.

The Little Angels are supported financially by the Tongil Group, a South Korean business group associated with the Unification Church, through the Tongil Foundation. The Little Angels are part of the Sunhwa Arts School. School fees are sponsored by Sunhwa Educational Foundation so that any talented girl can apply.

== History ==
Little Angels were established as Daehan Children's Art Troupe on May 5, 1962. It was the time, when South Korea was still recovering from the Korean War. From the very beginning, the mission of the school was to be ambassadors of peace and goodwill, and use creativity to counter the negative image of South Korea at that time, symbolized by famine, poverty, and abandonment, by spreading the 5,000-year-old Korean cultural traditions.

In 1965 permission was granted to establish the Little Angels art school for 720 students and 12 classes.

In 1974, the Little Angels Art Education Center was completed. The newly opened school, called Little Angels School of Arts, accepted 240 pupils. The school was opened by Bo-hi Pak who became the first principal of the school.

In 1975, Sunhwa Academy was founded and Bo-hi Pak was named the first president.

In 1976, Sunhwa Arts High School was accredited and the following year the school was renamed from Little Angels Art School to Sunhwa Art School and Little Angels Troupe become a part of the school with a broader artistic focus.

From 1965 to 1988 they performed over 2000 shows in 40 countries and until 2015 over 7000 shows and 70 foreign tours in 60 countries.

In 1990, they performed in Moscow and the then-Soviet First Lady Raisa Gorbacheva was also a guest.

In May 1998, they performed as part of the cultural diplomacy of the founders in Pyongyang, North Korea. The North Korean leadership subsequently sent a Pyongyang school team to tour South Korea in May 2000.

In 2010, on the 60th anniversary of the Korean War, the South Korean government with the Korean War 60th Anniversary Memorial Committee sponsored a Little Angels tour to all countries participating in the 1950 UN appeal for the defense of South Korea. Little Angels started their tour in Norfolk, United States because of ties of the city to General McArthur, who according to officiators turned the momentum of the war. Later that year they traveled to the other 15 nations that had sent troops to support South Korea in the UN force.

== Repertoire ==
The repertoire of Little Angels is classical Korean dance, singing, and playing traditional Korean musical instruments.

- Chorus – accompanied by their conductor at the piano singing international songs and tunes from Korea.
- Dances:
  - New Years' Day – since 2021, Choreography Bae Jung-hae, the theme of the Lunar New Year (Seollal) celebration.
  - Peace Road – since 2020, Choreography Bae Jung-hae, dance promoting Peace, global human family, harmony, and cooperation.
  - Jinsoe Festival – an adaptation of the traditional Korean dance "Jinsoe Chum" with gwengwaris (small Korean gongs).
  - Hwageom – dance inspired by the Wonhwa, ladies from the elite class of Hwarang in the Silla Dynasty.
  - Palace – an adaptation of traditional court dances with hansam (flowing extended sleeves) movements.
  - Miyal – dance drama of the Miyal story using a fan.
  - Folk Singing with Gayageum – group performance with gayageum, a musical instrument that originated in the Gaya kingdom and passed on to the Shilla Dynasty.
  - Moon Festival – performance of the Moon Festival (Ganggangsullae), in Korea symbolizing the defense of the fatherland. Dance Ganggangsullae is listed as UNESCO world heritage.
  - Doll Dance – dance inspired by a Korean tradition – a literal doll dance performed on the lunar new year.
  - Farm Dance – an expression of the farmer's thanksgiving during the fruitful autumn harvest season.
  - Warrior's Dance – inspired by general Kim Yu-sin and the Hwarang order in the 7th century, using a melody of the Ballad of Gyeongbuk Palace.
  - Travel by Night – dance story from the Korean past, when grandfather carries his granddaughter through the night.
  - Fan Dance – dance with a fan, which is the symbol of noblesse, a part of Korean tradition.
  - Drum Dance – rhythmic dance with 6 standing drums symbolizes tensions between body and soul.
  - Wedding Day – a dance story of a ludicrous wedding in ancient times, when a very young boy is called to take a much older bride.
  - Hourglass Drum Dance – rhythmic dance with a long, hourglass-shaped drum.
  - Toy Soldiers – dance of the toy soldiers to the music of the Radetzky March, first performed for Queen Elizabeth II. on November 15, 1971.
  - Spring Time – dance of spring-time traditions.
  - The Legend of Chunhyang – puppet-style dance story of the love and fidelity of Korean heroine Chunhyang towards her fiancé.
  - Mask Dance – dance with masks of various kinds is a traditional part of local cultural festivals of ancient Korea.
  - Flower Crown Dance – a modern adaptation of Korean traditional court dance.

== Discography ==
Albums:

- The Little Angels, Vinyl LP (Label: Philips – 6308 137), UK, Australia 1972
- The Little Angels Smile, Vinyl LP (Label: MGM Records – SE-4927, Special Products Division), US 1973
- The Little Angels, Vinyl LP (Label: Philips – 6308 137, Fontana – SEL-100092), South Korea, Jul 21, 1973
- 리틀 엔젤스 애창곡 (Little Angels Favorite Songs), CD (SKC SKCD-C-0003), South Korea, March 1, 1987
- The Little Angels Sing – X-Mas Cards, CD (SKC SKCD-0057),1987
- Les Petits Anges De Corée – Bienvenue À Séoul, CD (Label: Forlane – UCD 19014), 1988
- Little Angels Pyongyang Performance Special, CD 1998
- 공연실황 – 화관무/부채춤/강강수월래 (Live performance – Hwagwanmu / Fan dance / Ganggangsuwolae), Laser Disc (Label. SKC SKST-2003), 2003
- 리틀엔젤스예술단 – 창단 50주년 특집 (Little Angels Art Troupe – Special performance on the 50th anniversary of its founding), CD (self-released), 2012

Singles & EPs:

- The Little Angels National Folk Ballet Of Korea – Children Of The World Unite, Vinyl SP (Label: Philips – 6006 270), Netherlands 1972
- The Little Angels National Folk Ballet Of Korea – Mother Of Mine, Vinyl SP (Label: Philips – 6006 257), United Kingdom 1972
- The Little Angels – Dominique / Echo Of The Angels, Vinyl SP (Label: MGM Records – K-14657), US 1973
- The Little Angels – Children Of The World Unite, Vinyl SP (Label: Philips – 6006 270), New Zealand 1973
- The Little Angels – Dominique / Mother Of Mine, Vinyl SP (Label: Philips – SFL 1768), Japan
- 8.15 광복절 기념 리틀엔젤스 합창곡 모음 (8.15 Liberation Day Celebration Little Angels Choral Songs), 2021

== Overseas tours ==
List of overseas tours:

#	Tour name / program	From	To	Venue
1	1st US Tour, including Special Performance for US President Eisenhower	1965-09-20	1965-12-16	Gettysburg, PA, US
2	2nd US Tour, including Invitational Performance at the National Press Club, Washington, D.C.	1966-10-27	1967-02-28	Washington, D.C., U.S.
3	North American Tour, including a week of Performances at the Lincoln Center, N.Y. at the request of the White House (first as a foreign institution)	1967-10-27	1968-01-11	United States and Canada
4	North America and Japan Tour including participation in the Mexico Olympics Culture & Art Festival (enhanced national prestige)	1968-09-17	1969-02-04	Mexico, United States, Japan
5	North America and Japan Tour including Special Performance for the U.S.A. President Nixon and British Prime Minister Heath at the request of the President	1970-09-25	1971-01-25	US, Japan & Canada
6	Europe Tour including a Performance at the British Royal Court at the request of Queen Elisabeth II.	1971-08-27	1971-12-23	Three Nations including Germany and UK
7	Europe Tour including a Meeting with Princess Beatrix of the Netherlands	1972-10-07	1973-02-08	Three Nations including the Netherlands, France
8	Special Fundraising Performance Tour for Rebuilding after the Vietnam War	1972-11-09	1973-03-04	Japan
9	World Tour including Special Performance for 50th Anniversary of the Republic of Turkey	1973-07-06	1973-12-14	Five Nations including Germany, Switzerland
10	North American Tour including Special Fundraising Performance for UNICEF at the UN General Assembly	1973-08-27	1973-12-23	US & Canada
11	North American Tour including Expo'74, World's Fair, in Spokane, Washington	1974-05-28	1974-10-12	US & Canada
12	World Tour including Courtesy Call & Performance for first Tunisian President Bourguiba	1974-07-28	1974-11-24	19 Nations including Taiwan, Philippines
13	World Tour including Courtesy Call to Japanese Deputy Prime Minister Fukuda	1974-10-12	1975-02-14	Six Nations including Japan
14	World Tour including a Courtesy Call & Special Performance for Chile President Pinochet and the First Lady	1975-05-30	1975-10-14	11 Nations including US, Canada
15	US and Europe tour including 4th Conference of the International Association of University presidents in Boston	1975-08-28	1976-02-13	Three nations including the US, Germany
16	Special Congratulatory Performance for the 200th Anniversary of US Independence	1976-05-26	1976-11-02	US & Canada
17	Special Performance for Korea Day during the Tsukuba International Exposition	1985-05-12	1985-05-19	Tsukuba, Japan
18	Tour in Japan	1990-01-15	1990-01-27	Cities in Japan including Tokyo, Nagoya, and Osaka
19	Soviet Union Fundraising Performance for Children's Welfare	1990-04-07	1990-04-18	The Soviet Union
20	4 – City Tour in Taiwan	1990-07-10	1990-07-22	Taipei, Taichung, Tainan, Kaohsiung
21	Performance in Live International Telethon in Russia	1991-12-29	1992-01-14	Russia
22	Tour in the US	1992-01-10	1992-01-31	Locations in the US including NY, New Jersey, Florida
23	Ten – Performance Tour in Japan	1992-07-20	1992-08-13	Cities in Japan including Tokyo, Osaka, Sendai, Nagoya
24	Tour to Major US Cities	1993-01-12	1993-02-04	Carnegie Hall (NY) & Kennedy Center (Washington, DC)
25	14 – City Tour in Japan	1993-07-25	1993-08-19	14 cities in Japan including Tokyo, Osaka, Fukuoka
26	China Tour including Participation in the Opening Ceremony of CIGF (China International Garment and Textile Fair Dalian)	1994-07-28	1994-08-26	Taiwan & China
27	14 Performances in Malaysia & Thailand	1996-01-01	1996-01-15	Kuala Lumpur, Malaysia & Bangkok, Thailand
28	12 – City Tour in Japan	1996-01-04	1996-01-28	12 cities in Japan including Hokkaido, Aomori
29	Special Live Performance for Israel National Television, CH2	1996-07-31	1996-08-18	Israel
30	11 – City Tour in Japan	1997-01-04	1997-01-21	11 cities in Japan including Fukuoka, Hiroshima, Nagasaki
31	22 – Performance South American Tour	1997-07-20	1997-08-23	Brazil, Paraguay, Uruguay
32	13 – City Tour in Japan	1997-08-04	1997-08-31	13 cities in Japan including Hokkaido, Sendai
33	12 – City Tour in Japan	1998-01-12	1998-01-31	12 cities in Japan including Fukuoka, Okazaki
34	Three Performances in North Korea Supporting Reconciliation and Cooperation between North and South Korea	1998-05-01	1998-05-12	Pyongyang, North Korea
35	Ten-City Tour in Japan	1998-07-22	1998-08-20	Ten cities in Japan including Nagano, Chiba, Osaka
36	Nine-City Tour in Japan	1999-08-04	1999-08-23	Nine cities in Japan including Tokyo, Fukuoka, Kobe
37	Seven-City Tour in Japan	2000-07-28	2000-08-13	Seven cities in Japan including Miyagi, Gunma, Tokyo
38	Ten-City Tour in the US	2001-01-01	2001-02-03	Ten cities in the US including NY, Washington, San Antonio
39	Ten-City Tour in Japan	2001-01-12	2001-01-28	Ten cities in Japan including Tokyo, Hiroshima
40	Tour Commemorating the 10th Anniversary of Korea – China Diplomatic Relations	2001-07-12	2001-07-21	China
41	Six-City Tour in Japan	2001-07-29	2001-08-09	Six cities in Japan including Sapporo, Nagano, Maeba
42	Ten-City Tour in Japan	2002-07-29	2002-08-12	Ten cities in Japan including Tokyo, Nagoya, Kyoto
43	Ten-City Tour in the US	2003-01-19	2003-03-05	Ten cities in the US including Chicago, NY, Washington
44	Conference on the Reunification of North & South Korea and Peace in Asia	2003-02-10	2003-02-12	International Conference Hall, Osaka, Japan Kansai
45	Special Performance in Shanghai for the Promotion of Culture & Art	2003-10-23	2003-10-27	Shanghai, China
46	Six-City Japan Tour	2004-02-04	2004-02-20	Six cities in Japan including Fukuoka, Hiroshima
47	Celebration of the 100th Anniversary of Korean Immigration to the US	2004-02-09	2004-03-05	US Tour
48	Korean Wave Festival in Beijing	2004-07-14	2004-07-17	The Great Hall of the People, Beijing, China
49	Nine-City Tour in Japan	2005-07-26	2005-08-13	Nine cities in Japan including Tokyo, Sendai
50	ITU (International Telecommunication Union) Plenipotentiary Conference 2006	2006-11-07	2006-11-15	Antalya, Turkey
51	Five-City Tour in the US	2007-01-10	2007-01-30	Five cities in the US including Chicago, and Detroit.
52	Seven-City Tour in Japan	2007-07-25	2007-08-08	Seven cities in Japan including Tokyo, and Osaka.
53	Special Performance supporting the bid to Host Expo 2012 in Yeosu Korea	2007-11-21	2007-11-28	Paris, France
54	Seven-City Tour in Japan	2008-07-29	2008-08-13	Seven cities in Japan including Tokyo, Fukuoka
55	Seven-City Tour in the US	2009-01-13	2009-02-21	Seven cities in the US including Saint Louis, Burlington
56	Congratulatory Performance for the Opening of the 2009 Rotary International Convention	2009-06-19	2009-06-25	Birmingham, UK
57	Invitational Performance in Qatar	2009-10-24	2009-10-29	Doha, Qatar
58	1st Korean War 60th Anniversary World Peace Tour to 16 UN Member Nations to Honor Korean War Veterans	2010-06-06	2010-07-09	US, Canada & Columbia
59	2nd Korean War 60th Anniversary World Peace Tour to 16 UN Member Nations to Honor Korean War Veterans	2010-09-07	2010-10-13	7 European Nations & 2 African Nations
60	3rd Korean War 60th Anniversary World Peace Tour to 16 UN Member Nations to Honor Korean War Veterans	2010-11-07	2010-12-07	4 Southeast Asian Nations
61	Nepal – Korea Goodwill Cultural Exchange	2011-02-21	2011-02-28	Nepal
62	Korean War 60th Anniversary World Peace Tour to Countries that Dispatched Medical Units during the Korean War	2011-05-14	2011-06-13	5 European Nations & 1 African Nation
63	Commemoration of the 10th Anniversary of 9/11	2011-09-07	2011-09-14	New York, US
64	Special Performance for Mongolia – Korea Cultural Exchange	2011-11-05	2011-11-11	Ulaanbaatar, Mongolia
65	World Peace Tour Commemorating the 60th Anniversary of the Korean War to Countries that Dispatched Medical Units during the Korean War, guest chief minister Sheila Dikshit	2011-11-19	2011-11-25	New Delhi, India
66	World Peace Tour Commemorating the 60th Anniversary of the Korean War – Western US Region	2012-02-06	2012-02-20	The Western region of the US
67	Tour Commemorating the 59th Anniversary of the Korean War Armistice (invited by Ministry of Patriots & Veterans Affairs)	2012-07-24	2012-07-31	Washington, DC, US
68	Tour Commemorating the 60th Anniversary of the Korean War Armistice (Banquet Honoring Korean War Veterans)	2013-07-25	2013-07-30	Washington, DC, US
69	Special Performance for KOREA FESTIVAL 2013 in Singapore; invited by the Embassy of the Republic of Korea in Singapore	2013-10-23	2013-10-28	EXPO Singapore
70	Little Angels Tour of Europe Celebrating the 70th Anniversary of Korea's Liberation	2015-05-06	2015-05-19	Austria, Frankfurt & London
71	Special Tour of Japan Commemorating the 50th Anniversary of Korea – Japan Diplomatic Relations	2015-11-22	2015-12-04	4 Cities in Japan: Tokyo, Kobe, Hiroshima & Fukuoka
72	Congratulatory Performance for the Launch of IAPP Asia – Oceania	2016-07-26	2016-08-02	Kathmandu, Nepal
73	Congratulatory Performances for the Launch of IAPP	2016-11-26	2016-12-05	National Theater, Washington, DC; Manhattan Center, New York
74	Korea – Malaysia Peace Tour & Goodwill Performance	2017-01-10	2017-01-19	Kuala Lumpur, Malaysia
75	Special Performance for the Launch of YSP Asia – Oceania	2017-06-10	2017-06-16	Impact Arena, Bangkok, Thailand
76	Commemorative Celebration of Moon Jae-in's presidential state visit to China. Korean – China Cultural Exchange Night	2015-11-11	2015-11-15	Great Hall of the People in Beijing, China
77	Congratulatory Performance for the Launch of IAPP, Heavenly Africa	2018-01-15	2018-01-25	CICAD, Dakar, Senegal, Africa
78	Hamina Tattoo International Military Music Festival	2018-07-30	2018-08-04	Bastian, Hamina, Finland
79	Little Angels Japan Tour	2019-01-16	2019-01-20	Omiya Sonic City, Tokyo
80	Special Performance to commemorate the 200th anniversary of Colombia's independence, at the invitation of the Embassy of Colombia, Seoul.	2019-07-05	2019-07-07	Teatro Mayor Julio Mario Santo Domingo, Bogota, Colombia
81	Little Angels Japan tour	2019-10-04	2019-10-08	Aichi Sky Expo

== Notable alumni ==
- Sumi Jo – operatic soprano
- Young-ok Shin – coloratura soprano
- Kang Sue-jin – primabalerina in Stuttgart Ballet
- Park, Han-byul – Actor and model
- Hwang, Jung-eum – actress and singer
- Hoon-suk Moon – director of Universal Ballet
- Deok-su Kim – professor at Korea National University of Arts
- Shim Sook-kyung – choreographer of the National Gugak Center
- Lee No-yeon – chief choreographer of Busan City Dance Company
- Hong Kyung-hee – director of Jeonbuk Provincial Dance Company
- Nam Ki-moon – representative of Samulnori, National Gugak Center
- Shin Myung-sook – head of the Department of Dance and Art at Daejin University
- Kwak Eun-ah – professor of Korean Music at Ewha Womans University
- Jeon Eun-ja – professor of dance at Sungkyunkwan University
- Kim Woon-mi – professor of dance at Hanyang University
- Yu-oh Jeon – professor of dance at Seowon University
- Eun-young Park – KBS announcer

== Gallery ==
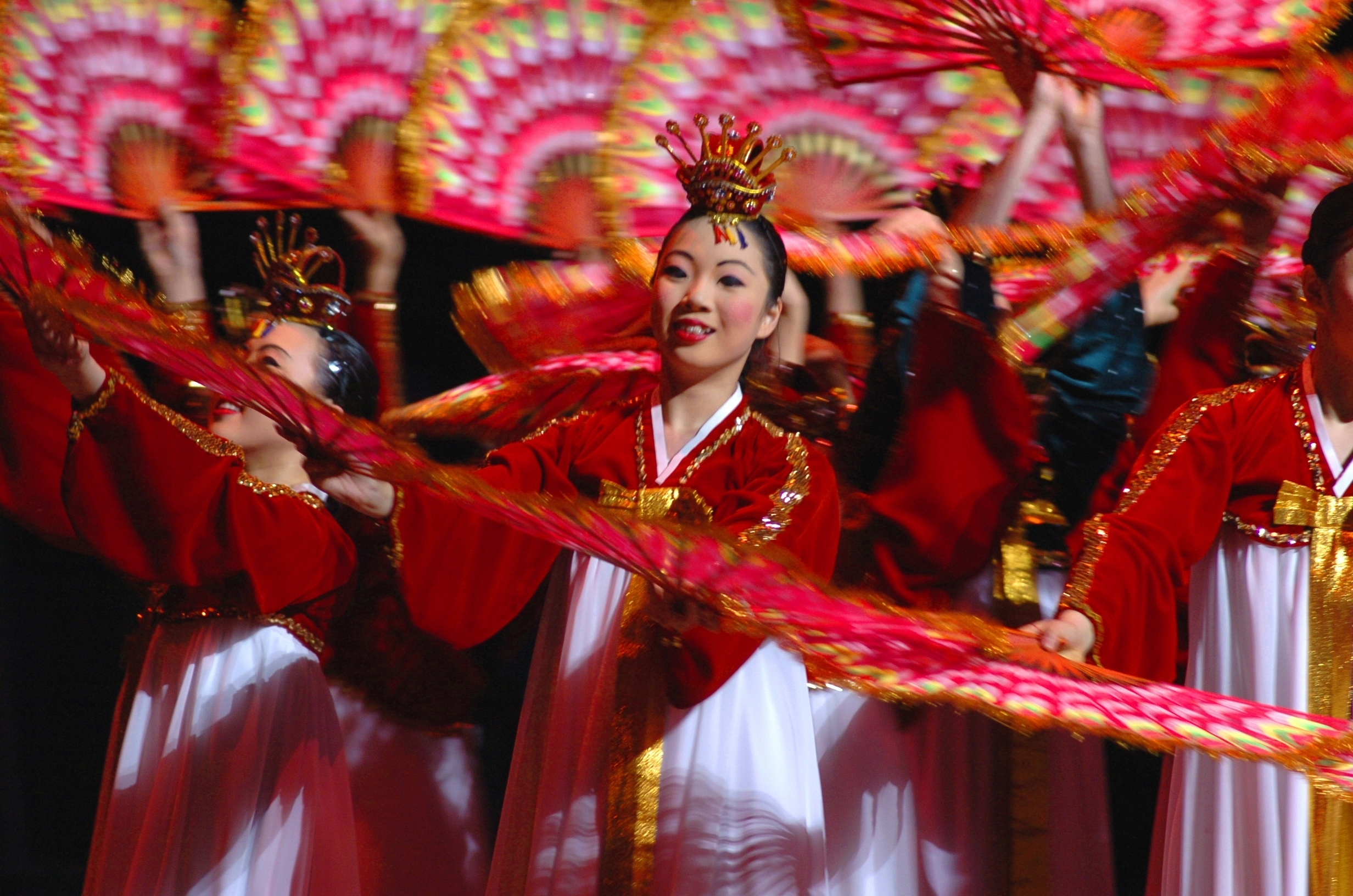
Dancers of the Little Angels performed Buchaechum, a traditional Korean fan dance at a performing arts centre in Seoul.

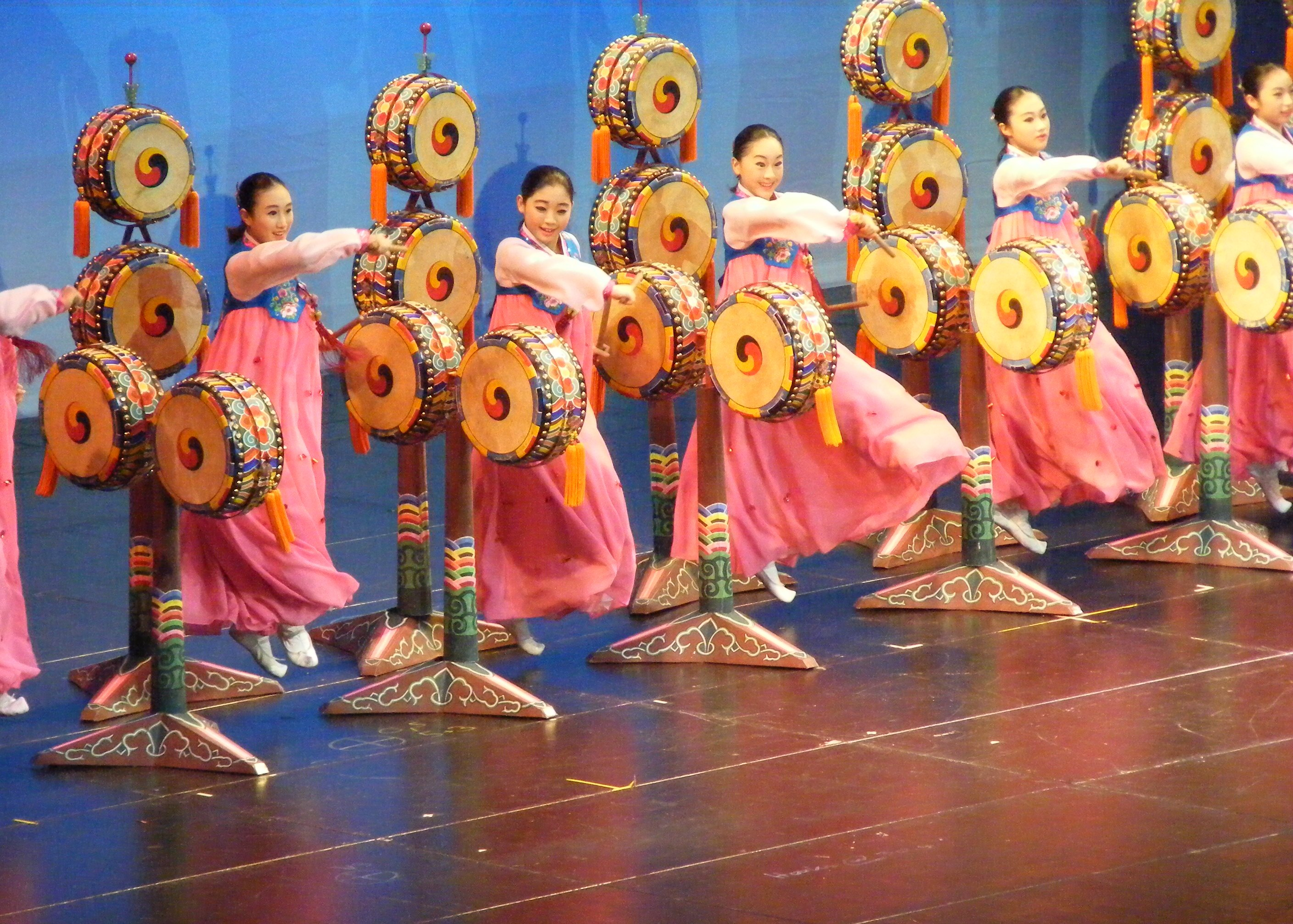
Members of Little Angels performing Drum Dance

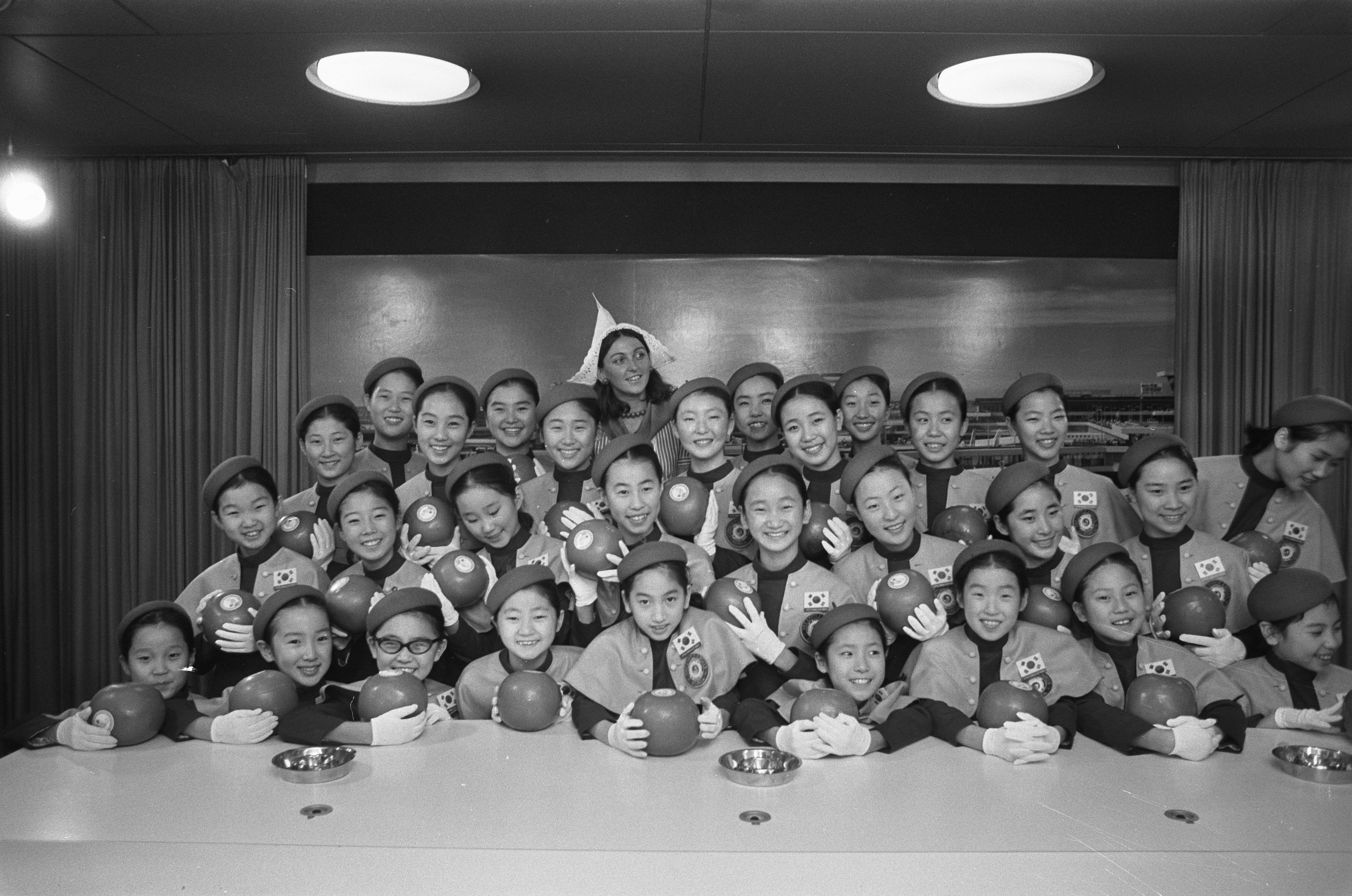
Artists in Schiphol before they perform for UNICEF in 1972

== See also ==
- Korean dance
