= Collective wedding =

Marriage ceremony for multiple couples at the same time

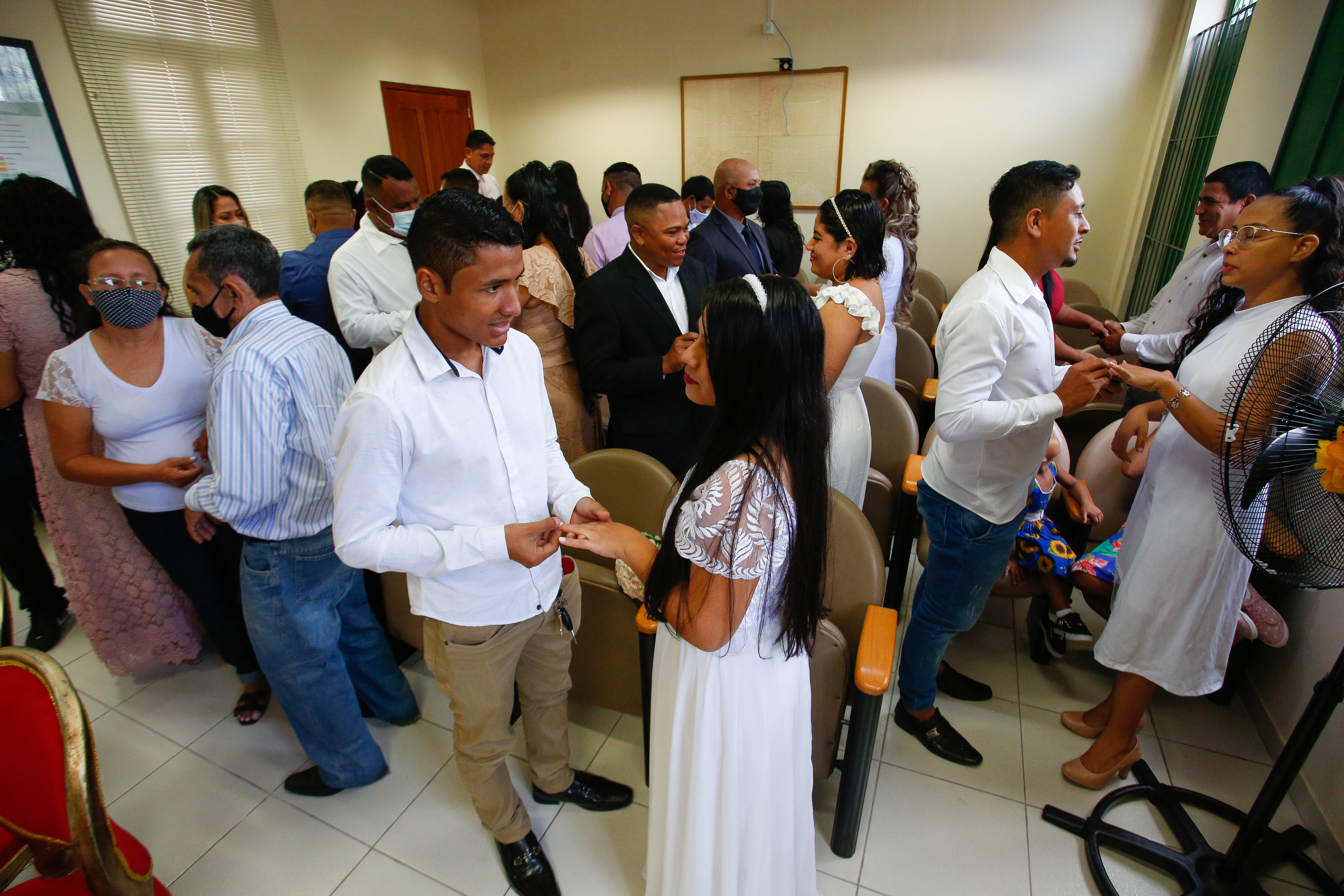
Collective marriage in Belém, Brazil.

A collective wedding or mass wedding is a marriage ceremony in which multiple couples are married at the same time.

== History ==
In 324 BC, Alexander the Great married Stateira II, the eldest daughter of Darius, King of the Achaemenid Empire. In the same ceremony, he wed many of his leading officers and outstanding soldiers to other Persian women, about 80 couples in all. Today, these ceremonies are now performed in places such as Afghanistan, Pakistan, China, Iran, Japan, Jordan, Palestine, South Korea, the Philippines, Turkey and Yemen.

== Financial considerations ==
Mass weddings are sometimes preferred for economic and social reasons, such as the reduction of costs for the venue, officiants, decorations, as well as the celebrations afterwards which can sometimes be shared between multiple families. In 2011, a collective wedding ceremony in India involved 4,000 couples, including Hindus, Christians, Buddhists, Jains, Sikhs, Muslims, and Adivasi. Many of them were the children of poor farmers.

In the Philippines, mass civil or religious weddings are a common phenomenon, and are often sponsored by government and charitable groups as a form of public service. Local politicians and sometimes celebrities participate as common wedding sponsors at such mass rites, which enable couples (and by extension their children) to benefit from formal state recognition of their unions. Parish churches also regularly offer collective Nuptial Masses for their low-income congregants, at times in partnership with the secular government of that predominantly Catholic nation.

== Rasme Saifee ==
Since 7 November 1960 (18th Jumada al-awwal 1380), under the guidance of Syedna Taher Saifuddin, Dawoodi Bohras have been conducting mass marriage events, at several venues, called Rasme Saifee (Arabic: الرسم السيفي). Currently, the largest event is held two days after the birthday of Syedna Mohammed Burhanuddin in Mumbai. The first such mass marriage was held in Jamnagar. The event is now professionally looked after by the community organisation, International Taiseerun Nikah Committee (I.T.N.C).

== Iran ==
The office of supreme leader in Iranian universities and office of deputy of women of Iranian president has begun a student wedding program. Oghaf and charity organization also has organized mass wedding for deaf people. Minister of Islamic Culture and IRGC organizes these easy weddings just as well.

== Unification Church ==
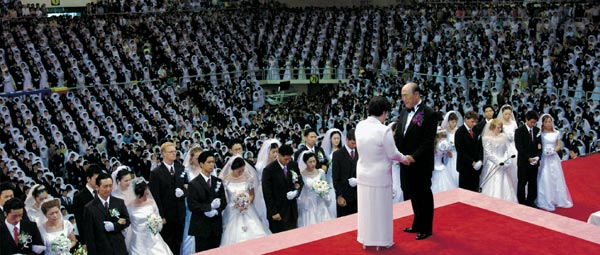
Sun Myung Moon and his wife Hak Ja Han preside over a mass blessing ceremony.

The Unification Church is known for holding collective weddings, known as the Holy Marriage Blessing Ceremony, which for some couples are marriage rededication ceremonies.

== See also ==
- Knobstick wedding
