= Nikkan Gendai =

Japanese newspaper

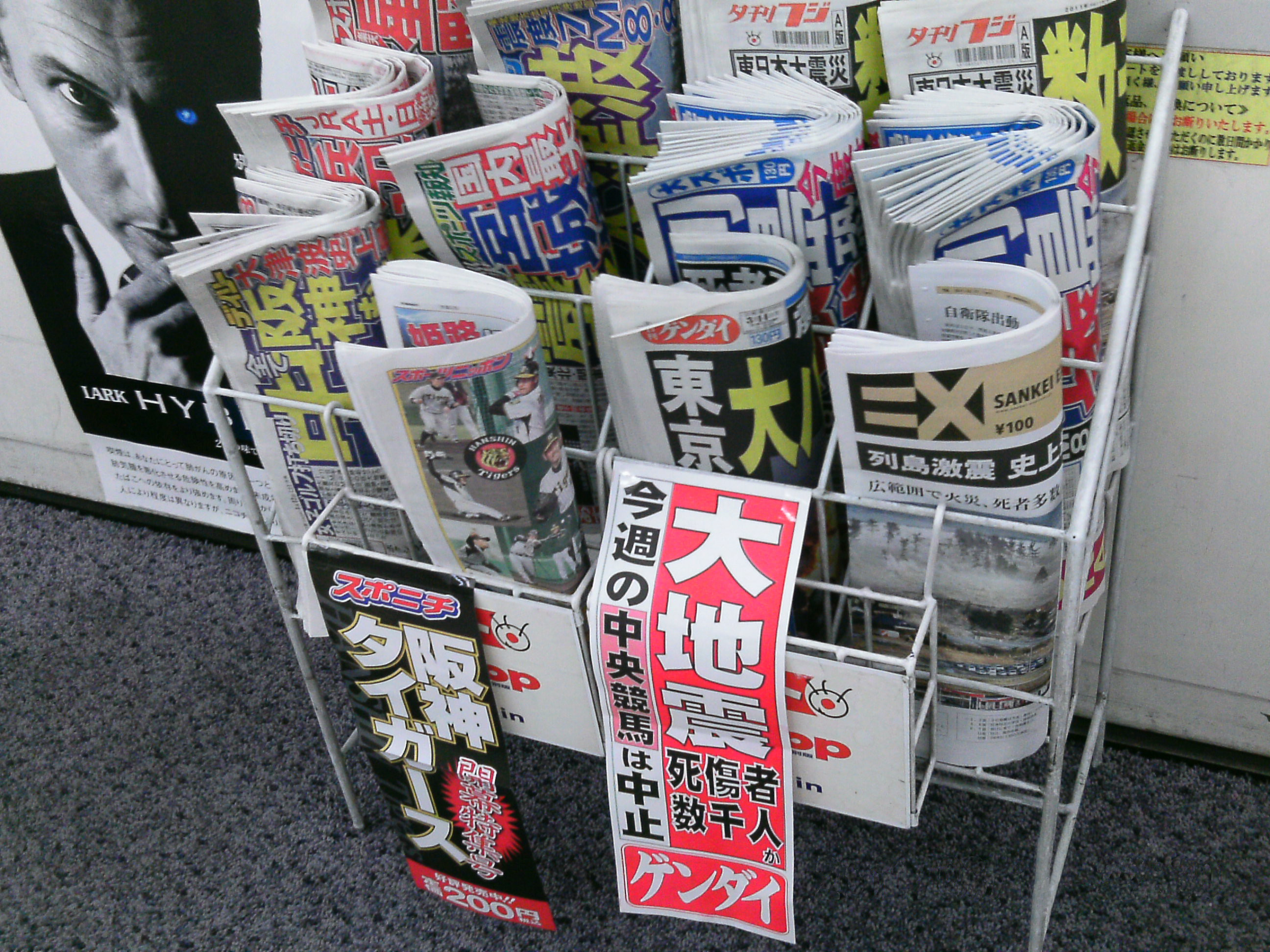
- Paper immediately after the Great East Japan Earthquake (second from the right in the front row)
- Type: Daily newspaper
- Format: Tabloid
- Founded: 1975
- Headquarters: 2-12-21 Otowa, Bunkyo-ku, Tokyo
- Circulation: Approximately 1,680,000
- Website: www.nikkan-gendai.com

Nikkan Gendai (日刊ゲンダイ) is a tabloid-sized evening newspaper published Nikkan Gendai Co., Ltd., a publisher belonging to the Otowa Group centered on Kodansha, and is a member of the Japan Magazine Publishers Association, an industry group of magazine publishers.

It is mainly sold at kiosk newsstands, and competes with Yukan Fuji and Tokyo Sports. Subscription by mail is possible.

It is published nationwide, mainly in the four major cities of Tokyo, Osaka, Nagoya, and Sapporo. The Chubu edition is published by Chubu Keizai Shimbun. In Sapporo, it was originally published as Nikkan Sapporo, (Note: A series of the discontinued Hokkai Times) but from June 2006, it was published as Nikkan Gendai. Tokyo and Osaka are directly managed, and Hokkaido and Chubu are franchise agreements. In Kyushu, it is sold at Hakata Station, Nishitetsu Fukuoka (Tenjin) Station, and Tenjin Station in Fukuoka City.

The paper was first published on October 27, 1975. The price at the time of the first issue was 40 yen.
