= International Conference on the Unity of Sciences =

Unification Church conference

The International Conference on the Unity of the Sciences is an academic conference founded by the Unification Church new religious movement in 1968.

These conferences have been attended by 5,000 to over 6,500 scholars, including two dozen Nobel laureates.

== ICUS XIII ==
The 13th annual ICUS conference on the theme "Absolute Values and the New Cultural Revolution" took place at the Marriott Hotel in Washington, bringing together 240 participants from 46 countries. Among them were the dean of international programs at Indiana University John V. Lombardi; Harvard Medical School biochemist Claude Villee; Morton Kaplan, a political scientist from the University of Chicago, and Eugene P. Wigner, a Princeton University physicist and Nobel laureate who, at an ICUS conference two years prior, received a $200,000 "founder's award" from Moon himself.

== ICUS XXVII ==
The 27th ICUS Conference was held online and hosted seventy-one scholars from thirteen countries focused on environmental issues such as "deforestation, desertification and the rise of antibiotic-resistant bacteria". It consisted of three main academic sessions each including their own open discussion on topics presented by the speakers and commentators.
