= Heung Jin Moon =

South Korean religious figure (1966–1984)

Heung Jin Moon (Korean: 문흥진; October 23, 1966 – January 2, 1984), also referred to by members of the Unification Church (UC) as Heung Jin Nim or posthumously as Lord Heung Jin Nim (흥진님 귀족), was the second son of church founders Sun Myung Moon and Hak Ja Han. At the age of 17 he died in a vehicle accident in New York State. Three months later his parents conducted a spiritual wedding ceremony between him and Julia Pak, daughter of church leader, Bo Hi Pak. He is officially regarded by the UC to be the "king of the spirits" in heaven (ranking higher than Jesus). After Moon's death, some church members claimed that they were channelling messages from his spirit. In 1988 a church member from Zimbabwe, named Cleopas Kundiona, claimed to be the incarnation of Moon. His acts of violence against church members were a source of controversy within the church. Moon is now believed by church members to be leading workshops in the spiritual world in which spirits of deceased persons are taught UC teachings.

== Death at age 17 ==
On December 22, 1983, his car collided with a jackknifing tractor-trailer on an icy highway (State Route 9 in Hyde Park, New York) and he died on January 2. UC leader Chung Hwan Kwak stated: "A truck lost control as it approached the car Heung Jin Nim was driving. Heung Jin Nim swerved the car to prevent the two friends who were with him from taking the brunt of the impact, and instead took it on himself."

== Spiritual marriage ==
Moon's death came before his planned arranged marriage to ballerina Julia Pak, daughter of Moon's interpreter, Bo Hi Pak. According to the tenets of Unificationism, only married couples may enter the highest level of heaven. His parents conducted a spiritual wedding ceremony three months later, February 20, 1984. Julia Pak, who now uses the name Julia Moon, said: "I will never forget in my whole life and for eternity this great honor of being Heung Jin Nim's bride, which I do not deserve".

== Significance attributed to Heung Jin Moon's death ==
The UC teaches that Heung Jin Moon's death had cosmic significance, and that he is now in a position in heaven higher than Jesus. Sun Myung Moon explained that his son's death was a great victory as it saved his own life; that his assassination by leftist terrorists was foiled on the same day as the accident, "that his son's loss was a providential act allowed by God in order to protect [Sun Myung] Moon's calling", and that there was a karmic connection between the two events:

If the sacrifice of Heung Jin Nim had not been made, either of two great calamities could have happened. Either the Korean nation could have suffered a catastrophic setback, such as an invasion from the North; or I myself could have been assassinated. Since special indemnity was paid that protected me in Korea at the Kwangju rally - Satan's specific target day - he hit Heung Jin Nim instead, at the same exact hour.

A week later Sun Myung Moon taught that Heung Jin Moon "had a new mission and was free to travel between his spirit world and our physical world". He also "proclaimed that Heung Jin became a leader to Jesus in the spirit realm".

Longtime president of the Korean UC Young Whi Kim wrote: "They all refer to Heung Jin Nim as the new Christ. They also call him the Youth-King of Heaven. He is the King of Heaven in the spirit world. Jesus is working with him and always accompanies him. Jesus himself says that Heung Jin Nim is the new Christ. He is the center of the spirit world now. This means he is in a higher position than Jesus." Sun Myung Moon's right-hand man Bo Hi Pak announced that Heung Jin Moon's sacrifice "carries far greater importance than the crucifixion of Jesus Christ".

== The "return" of the "spirit" of Heung Jin Moon ==
=== Posthumous, widespread channeling of Moon's spirit by Unification Church members ===
After Moon's death, UC members around the world spoke to small groups of members, saying that the messages they were conveying were from Heung Jin Moon, being received by them spiritually (see Channelling (mediumistic)). Other members said they experienced automatic writing from him, or other kinds of spiritual communications from him. According to one report: "Often it was unlikely people who ['channelled' him], even people who were not that spiritual. There was a sister in Britain called Faith Jones who gave guidance from him. A Dutch brother called Gerrit van Dorsten, who had been on the New York City Tribune also did." Andrea Higashibaba, then state leader of the UC in Tennessee, wrote an article in Today's World magazine detailing her encounters (in spirit) with Heung Jin Moon, leading up to a "liberation ceremony" for deceased civil rights leader Martin Luther King Jr. Soon many members around the world were "channeling Heung Jin Nim." Typically these messages were ones of love and support.

=== Black Heung Jin Nim ===
Black Heung Jin Nim (also known as "Second Self Heung Jin Nim" and Cleopas Kundioni) refers to the alleged embodiment of the spirit of Heung Jin Moon in the body of a Zimbabwean member of the UC named Kundioni. Kundioni's name was not known by most church members at the time, but he met with Sun Myung Moon and members of the "True Family", who apparently accepted the "Black Heung Jin Nim" as a temporary union of the spirit of Heung Jin Moon with the mind and body of Kundioni.

Sun Myung Moon authorized the Black Heung Jin to travel the world, preaching and hearing the confessions of Unification Church members who had gone astray."

Kundioni came under criticism by both members and outsiders for his violence and harsh methods, including a beating that resulted in the hospitalization of church leader Bo Hi Pak. Church members do not believe that the severe violence was committed by the spirit of Heung Jin Moon. At a certain point after his world tour of Unification churches, Sun Myung Moon said that Kundioni was no longer channeling Heung Jin Moon, and sent him back to Africa.

==== Viewpoints on channeling ====
Several views of the phenomenon have emerged. Members generally believed that the channeling was legitimate at first, pointing to the endorsement by Sun Myung Moon. Some critics do not believe there ever was genuine channeling. Church members do not believe that the worst violence was committed by the spirit of Heung Jin Moon:

To me, the evidence clearly supports the view that Mr. Sudo currently teaches at Chung Pyung, namely that the serious violence was NOT done by Heung Jin.

In 1987, leaders of the UC were told that Heung Jin Moon had returned to earth in the body of a Zimbabwean member. The African was accepted by Sun Myung Moon and church officials as Heung Jin Moon's continuous channel - a "twenty-four hour" a day "embodiment" - and became known as "the Black Heung Jin Nim."

With Sun Myung Moon's approval he toured the world visiting Unification churches in a number of countries over several months, accompanied by church leaders and security guards. As channel for "Lord Heung Jin Nim" he was in a position of authority above that of all members, including top leaders apart from his parents Sun Myung Moon and Hak Ja Han. Those members who confessed to certain sins received beatings; Damian Anderson (a UC member) reports seeing him "knock people's heads together, hit them viciously with a baseball bat, smack them around the head, punch them, and handcuff them with golden handcuffs." Sun Myung Moon's right-hand man Bo Hi Pak received a beating that was potentially life-threatening and required hospitalization. Anderson was particularly upset that top church officials and their assistants prevented people by force from leaving.

Church members believed that because the medium was a "twenty-four hour" "embodiment" or "returning resurrection" of Heung Jin Moon's spirit, and that "the Zimbabwean's body was merely the instrument of Heung Jin Nim's spirit", these were really the actions of Heung Jin Moon; Larry Moffitt, a church media executive, wrote:

By January 1988, working at what one account described as "an incredible pace," Heung Jin Nim in his new form conducted four special three-day conferences in Africa, then successive conferences in Greece, Thailand, Columbia, Argentina, France, England, America and the Far East. ... Heung Jin Nim conducted three conferences in the U.S.: at the World Mission Center in Manhattan, at the Washington, D.C. church, and at a church workshop site in the San Francisco Bay Area. These were attended by approximately 800 members each. He also conducted a smaller session at the church's seminary at Barrytown, New York and several more private sessions. Most importantly, he met Rev. and Mrs. Moon and appeared to gain their sanction. According to one description, he "ran over to Father and practically jumped into his arms, saying 'Father! Father!' Then he embraced Mother tightly, crying, 'Mother! Mother!' " At the beginning of the New York conference, Hyo Jin Nim Moon, Heung Jin Nim's elder brother, spoke in tears, stating, "I have the most reason to be skeptical, but now I know it's my brother. Please receive him." These conferences and the accompanying worldwide tour consummated the Heung Jin Nim revival but also terminated it. By summer 1988, Rev. Moon somewhat comically directed Heung Jin Nim's embodiment to return to Africa, an order that he disobeyed, since he enjoyed the power that came with abusing members, just like Rev. Moon. At this point, there was a consensus that Heung Jin Nim's spirit had left the embodiment and an evil spirit had taken over.

== Heung Jin Moon's ongoing "work in the spirit world" ==
According to church teachings, Heung Jin Moon continues to do important work for the benefit of humanity, as leader of the spiritual realm. At large retreat seminars in Korea where for years thousands of Unificationists came from all over the world to rid themselves of evil spirits, Heung Jin Moon is said by the church to play an important role, as related by scholar of new religious movements Massimo Introvigne:

With the assistance of angels, many spirits are said to be encouraged to leave Unificationists' bodies and go to the spiritual world for a Divine Principle workshop led by Heung Jin Moon.
