= Universal Ballet =

South Korean ballet company

The Universal Ballet (Korean: 유니버설 발레단) was founded in Seoul, South Korea in 1984. One of only five professional ballet companies in South Korea, the company performs a repertory that includes many full length classical story ballets, together with shorter contemporary works and original full-length Korean ballets created especially for the company. The company is supported by followers of the Rev. Sun Myung Moon, with Moon's daughter-in-law Julia H. Moon, who was the company's prima ballerina until 2001, now serving as General Director.

According to the New York Times the Universal Ballet is considered to be one of Asia's leading ballet companies.
