= Tongil Group =

Korean Unification Church business group

Tongil Group (Korean: 통일그룹) is a Korean business group (chaebol) associated with the Unification Church. (“Tongil” is Korean for “unification,” the name of the Unification Church in Korean is “Tongilgyo.”) It was founded in 1963 by Unification Church founder Sun Myung Moon (following the purchase of a surplus Japanese lathe in 1962) as a nonprofit organization which would provide revenue for the Unification Church. Its core focus was manufacturing but in the 1970s and 1980s it expanded by founding or acquiring businesses in pharmaceuticals, tourism, and publishing.

In 1998 Tongil Group was about 35th in size among South Korean business groups and was in the process of expanding into North Korea, with the blessing of the South Korean government which had previously forbidden relationships between North Korea and South Korean businesses.

In the 1990s Tongil Group suffered as a result of the 1997 Asian financial crisis. By 2004 it was losing money and was $3.6 billion in debt. In 2005 Moon’s son, Kook-jin Justin Moon (founder of Kahr Arms) was appointed chairman of Tongil Group. As of 2010 he was in the process of reforming its businesses by hiring new managers and by closing unprofitable operations. Among Tongil Group’s chief holdings are: The Ilwha Company, which produces ginseng and related products; Ilshin Stone, building materials; and Tongil Heavy Industries, machine parts including hardware for the South Korean military.

The Tongil Group funds the Tongil Foundation which finances about 20 religious and educational institutions, including the Sun Moon University, and the Little Angels Children’s Folk Ballet of Korea; as well as donating to the Unification Church itself.

== See also ==
- Unification Church
