= Lee Shapiro =

Lee Shapiro may refer to:

- Lee Shapiro (filmmaker)
- Lee Shapiro (musician)
