= True World Foods =

American food service company

- Industry: Seafood
- Founded: 1976 or 1980
- Key people: Eiji "Ken" Ueda (Chief Operating Officer)
- Parent: True World Holdings LLC

True World Foods LLC and its subsidiaries (collectively, ""TWF") is a major fish supplier that offers a complete line of items for mainly Japanese and Korean restaurants, with the largest part being fish. TWF has 23 distribution centers in the US, five distribution centers in Canada, one center in the UK, one center in Spain and one in Germany, each of which operates as a separately managed limited liability company or corporation.

== History ==
Starting in 1996, True World Foods began to roll up independent seafood distribution companies founded by entrepreneurs who were inspired by the ocean vision of Rev Sun Myung Moon. Reverend Moon delivered a speech in 1980 entitled "The Way of Tuna" in which he claimed that "After we build the boats, we catch the fish and process them for the market, and then have a distribution network. This is not just on the drawing board; I have already done it." and declared himself the "king of the ocean." However, True World Foods is neither owned nor controlled by what is now known as the Unification Church. The Church has denied controlling True World.

By 2006 True World Foods controlled a major portion of the sushi trade in the US and employed hundreds of people with annual revenues of $250 million.

During the COVID-19 pandemic the company launched home delivery sushi kits to make up for a lack of sales to restaurants.

== Operations ==
An incident at the True World processing plant in Kodiak, Alaska, led to the company pleading guilty in federal court and fined $150,000. The facility had accepted a load of pollock which was in excess of the trip limit for the offloading vessel. True World operated a processing plant in suburban Detroit which was closed after repeated conflict with the Food and Drug Administration.

== Subsidiaries ==
- International Lobster

== See also ==
- FCF Co., Ltd.
- Bolton Group
- Itochu
- Unification Church of the United States
