= List of Unification movement people =

Notable members and supporters of the Unification Church.

== Moon family ==
The family of Reverend Sun Myung Moon (1920–2012), founder and leader of the Unification Church, and his wife Hak Ja Han are known as the "True Family". Moon and Han are known as "True Father" and "True Mother" within the movement, and collectively "True Parents". They were married in 1960. Their children are known as the "True Children":

- Hyo Jin Moon (1962–2008) – Moon and Han's first son, who died of a heart attack in 2008. He was a musician and a recording facility executive. He was born in South Korea and grew up in the United States in New York State.
- Heung Jin Moon (1966–1984) – Moon and Han's second son, who died in an auto accident and is believed by members to be leading workshops in the afterlife in which spirits of deceased persons are taught Unification movement teachings.
- Un Jin Moon (born 1967) – Moon and Han's daughter. She left the church and divorced her husband, who had been picked for her by her parents.
- In Jin Moon – Moon and Han's second daughter and president of the Unification Church of the United States from 2008 to 2012.
- Kook Jin Moon – Moon and Han's fourth son. Businessman and firearms designer. Owns and operates Kahr Arms, a U.S. small arms manufacturer, former chairman of Tongil Group, a South Korean chaebol associated with the Unification Church.
- Hyun Jin Moon (born 25 May 1969) – Moon and Han's son, a social entrepreneur, and the founder and chairman of the Global Peace Foundation and the Family Peace Association.
- Hyung Jin Moon (born 1979) – Moon and Han's youngest son and former international president of the Unification Church. He has since founded a Pennsylvania-based unofficial Unification Church militant offshoot, World Peace and Unification Sanctuary, also known as "Rod of Iron Ministries".

== Unification Church members ==
- Ek Nath Dhakal, Nepalese politician.
- Mose Durst – President of the Unification Church of the United States in the 1980s, author, educator.
- David Eaton (born July 2, 1949, in Cleveland, Ohio) is an American composer and conductor who has been the music director of the New York City Symphony since 1985.
- Dan Fefferman – Executive Director of the International Coalition for Religious Freedom.
- Patrick Hickey – Nevada state legislator and author of Tahoe Boy: A Journey Back Home, his autobiography which told of his experiences as a Unification Church leader and of his marriage to a Korean woman introduced to him by Moon.
- Nansook Hong – Ex-wife of Hyo Jin Moon and ex-member of the Unification Church. Author of a book about her experiences, In the Shadow of the Moons: My Life in the Reverend Sun Myung Moon's Family.
- Dong Moon Joo is a Korean American businessman. He is a member of the Unification Church and is best known as the president of The Washington Times. During the presidency of George W. Bush, Joo had undertaken unofficial diplomatic missions to North Korea in an effort to improve its relationship with the United States.
- Young Oon Kim (1914–1989) was a leading theologian of the Unification movement and its first missionary to the United States.
- Chung Hwan Kwak – Former chairman and president of United Press International and of News World Communications, Inc.; former leader of many other Unification Church-affiliated organizations. Honorary President of the Global Peace Foundation.
- Tom McDevitt – President of The Washington Times, from 2007 to 2009. Unification movement spokesperson, and pastor in the Washington, D.C., region.
- Julia Moon (born 1963) – widow, by posthumous wedding, of Heung Jin Moon; born Hoon Sook Pak, oldest daughter of longtime major leader and key aide Bo Hi Pak; General Director and former prima ballerina of Universal Ballet, South Korea.
- Bo Hi Pak (1930−2019) — Founding chairman and president of The Washington Times; main translator (during the 70s and 80s) for Moon's speeches given to English speaking audiences. Author of Messiah, a biography of Sun Myung Moon.
- Junko Sakurada (桜田 淳子) – Singer and actress.
- Neil Albert Salonen – Former president of the Unification Church of the United States and of the University of Bridgeport.
- Lee Shapiro (1949–1987) – Documentary filmmaker, died while filming in Afghanistan in 1987, during the Soviet–Afghan War.
- Josette Sheeran – Vice Chairman of the World Economic Forum, formerly executive director of the United Nations World Food Programme and journalist and editor of The Washington Times.
- Kevin Thompson – Pastor of the Bay Area Family Church, a Unification Church congregation located in San Leandro, California.
- Jonathan Wells (1942–2024) – Author of Icons of Evolution: Science or Myth? and former senior fellow of the Discovery Institute's Center for Science and Culture.
- Andrew Wilson – Professor at Unification Theological Seminary; editor of World Scripture: A Comparative Anthology of Sacred Texts.

== Supporters of the Unification Church ==
- Ralph Abernathy (1926-1990), minister, civil rights leader, served as vice president of the Unification Church-affiliated group American Freedom Coalition, and served on two Unification movement boards of directors.
- Shinzo Abe (1954–2022), Prime Minister of Japan (2006-2007 and 2012-2020). He was linked indirectly to the Japanese Unification Church, and these remote ties were cited as a major motive for his assassination in 2022.
- Neil Bush, businessman, son of 41st President George H. W. Bush and brother of 43rd President George W. Bush, promoted Moon and the Unification Church at events in Asia-Pacific and the United States.
- Manu Chandaria, Kenyan businessman, is a member of the Global Leadership Council and the patron and chairman of the Global Peace Foundation in Africa.
- Danny K. Davis, United States congressman co-sponsored a 2004 ceremony in which Moon was crowned the "King of Peace."
- Louis Farrakhan, leader of The Nation of Islam, an African American Islamic organization, served as a "co-officiator" at a Blessing ceremony of the Unification Church. In 2000 the Unification movement co-sponsored the Million Family March, a rally in Washington D.C. to celebrate family unity and racial and religious harmony, along with the Nation of Islam. Farrakhan was the main speaker at the event.
- Newt Gingrich, former Speaker of the US House who spoke at events held by Unification Church-affiliated organizations and wrote opinion pieces for The Washington Times which is owned by the Unification Church.
- Morton Kaplan (1921-2017), author and University of Chicago professor of political science. Editor of Unification Church owned The World & I magazine and organizer of movement sponsored conferences.
- Kim Chong Pil (1926–2018), South Korean politician and founder of the Korean Central Intelligence Agency (KCIA), supported the Unification Church's political activism in the United States.
- Nobusuke Kishi (1896–1987), Japanese politician and Prime Minister and grandfather of Shinzo Abe. He was longstanding supporter the Japanese Unification Church, which his postwar political agenda led him to help set up in 1963.
- Douglas MacArthur II (1909-1997), American diplomat. Chairman of the World Media Association and member of the editorial advisory board of the Washington Times.
- Emmanuel Milingo, now excommunicated Roman Catholic archbishop, married by Moon in 2001 to Unification Church member and supporter of Unification Church projects.
- Richard L. Rubenstein (1924-2021), author and educator. Appointed by Moon as president of the University of Bridgeport.
- Ryōichi Sasakawa (1899-1995), Japanese businessman and philanthropist. Supported Moon's anti-communist work in Asia.
- Ninian Smart (1927–2001), Scottish author and professor at University of Lancaster and University of California at Santa Barbara. President of the American Academy of Religion. Supported the Inter Religious Federation for World Peace, the International Conference on the Unity of the Sciences and other Unification Church affiliated projects.
- George Augustus Stallings, Jr., former Roman Catholic priest. Organized Washington, D.C. coronation of Moon. Married and his wife were in Unification Church celebration.
- Peter Tapsell (1930-2012), former Speaker of the New Zealand House of Representatives. In 2006, he sponsored the Unification Church organization Universal Peace Federation in New Zealand and spoke at a rally with Mrs. Moon.
- Donald Trump, real estate investor and President of the United States (2017–2021 and 2025-) gave speeches at the event hosted by an affiliate of the Unification Church supporting Han's leadership and calling for Korean reunification.

== Reporters and opponents of the Unification Church ==
- Eileen Barker, British sociologist who studied the Unification Church's alleged brainwashing practices.
- Michelle Goldberg is an American journalist and author, and an op-ed columnist for The New York Times: "Like most Americans, Wineburg had been unaware of the power Moon holds in our nation's politics. Those events earned him a public reputation as a spectacle-mad eccentric, but that obscures his role as a significant D.C. power broker. In fact, Moon is an important patron of the Republican party and of the conservative movement."
- Steven Hassan, who served as a leader in the Unification Church of the United States before turning into anti-cult critic.
- Masaki Kito, acting executive for Zenkoku Benren.
- John Lofland (1946 - 2026) lived with HSA-UWC missionary Young Oon Kim and a small group of American members and studied their activities. Lofland published his findings in 1964 as a doctoral thesis entitled "The World Savers: A Field Study of Cult Processes", and in 1966 in book form by Prentice-Hall as Doomsday Cult: A Study of Conversion, Proselytization, and Maintenance of Faith.
- Peter Maass an investigative journalist who reported on the Unification Church's activities for The New Yorker and other publications.
- Walter Ralston Martin (1928 - 1989), leading Christian anti-cultist. Criticized Unification Church teachings in his best-selling book The Kingdom of the Cults.
- Robert Parry (1949 - 2018) was an American investigative journalist: "Over the past quarter century [1981 - 2006], South Korean theocrat Sun Myung Moon has been one of the Bush family’s major benefactors – both politically and financially."
- Sayuri Ogawa, former member turned anti-cult activist.
- Eito Suzuki, anti-cult investigative journalist.
- Tetsuya Yamagami, assassin who killed Shinzo Abe.

== See also ==
- Unification Church
- Unification Church of the United States
