= In Jin Moon =

American unificationist leader

In Jin Moon (or Tatiana Moon; born 1965) is the former president of the Unification Church of the United States and a daughter of Unification Church founder Reverend Sun Myung Moon and his wife Hak Ja Han.

== Life ==
Moon was born in South Korea in 1965 and moved with her family to the United States in 1973. She studied political science and philosophy at Columbia University and pursued her graduate studies at Harvard Divinity School. In the 1980s, Moon spoke at public rallies in support of her father who was being sued in United States vs. Sun Myung Moon by the United States government.

In 2008 Moon assumed the position of CEO at New York City's Manhattan Center, and implemented a restructuring. She was appointed president of the Unification Church of the United States in August 2008 and worked to modernize the church's worship style in an effort to bring in younger members. In 2011, she spoke at an inter-religious conference on religious freedom in Washington DC. In 2012, she resigned from her office at her mother's request and after numerous members complained following the birth of her child from an extramarital partner.

== See also ==
- List of Unification movement people
- Unification Church of the United States
