= Kevin Thompson (pastor) =

Paster at bay area family church

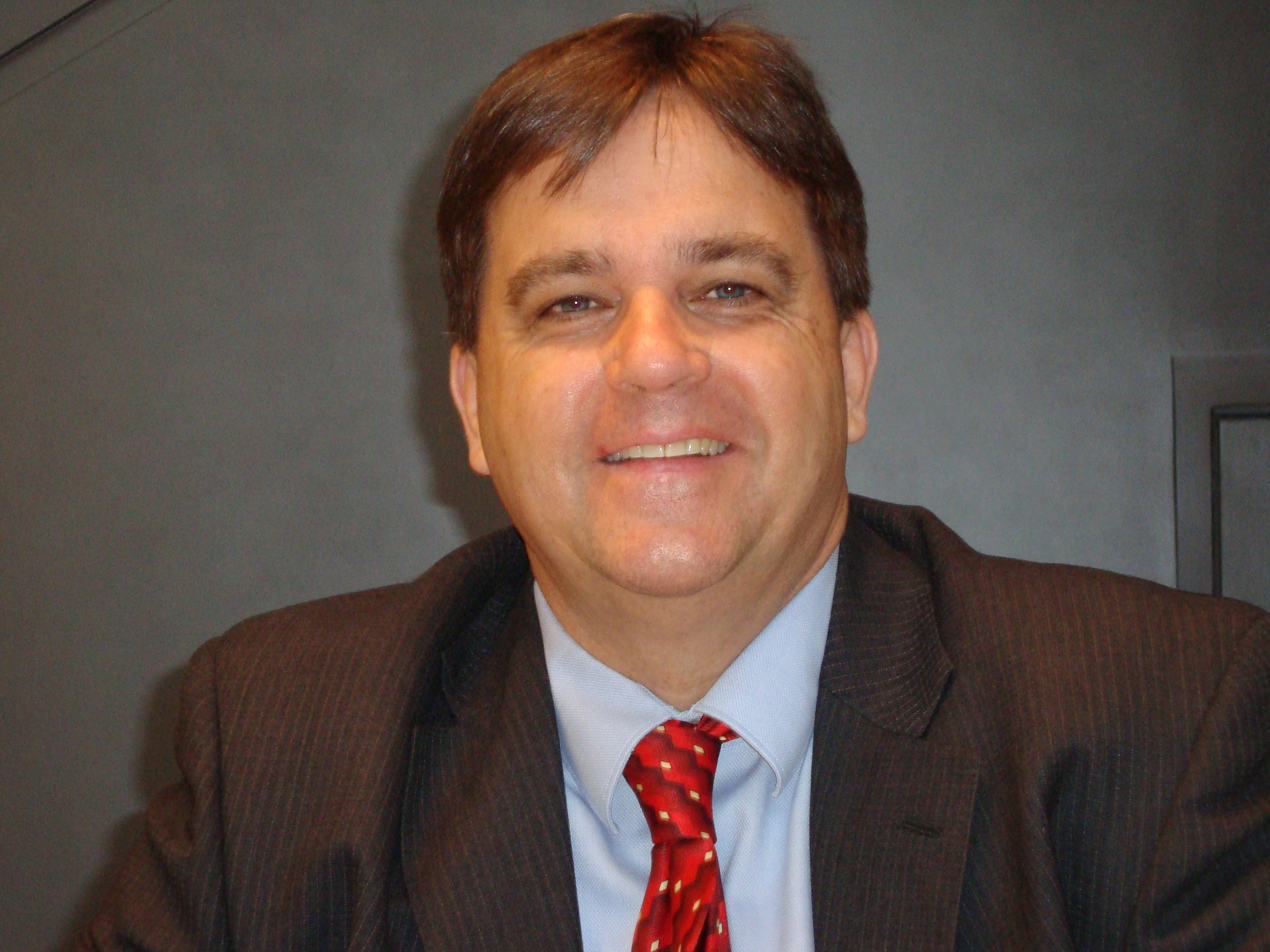
Kevin Thompson

Kevin Thompson (born 1958) is the incumbent pastor (for more than 15 years) of the Bay Area Family Church, a Unification Church of the United States congregation located in San Leandro, California. In 2006, he was indicted by a grand jury for violating the Lacey Act, a federal law which criminalizes the sale and purchase of certain protected species. On January 22, 2007, Thompson was sentenced to a year and a day in prison and was also ordered to pay $100,000 in restitution.

== Lacey Act ==
The Lacey Act prohibits selling or purchasing wildlife which was captured in violation of an underlying law or regulation. In January 1994, it became unlawful under California state law to capture leopard sharks (Triakis semifasciata) of less than 36 inches in length.

== Shark smuggling ==
From 1992 through 2003, Thompson enlisted several young men to catch and sell juvenile leopard sharks (leopard sharks which were less than the minimum legal length) from the San Francisco Bay. During that period of time, at least 465 leopard sharks were sold to companies in Miami; Chicago; Houston; Romulus, Michigan; Milford, Connecticut; the Netherlands; and the United Kingdom. Federal authorities learned of Thompson's involvement when pet dealers in Florida and Chicago were arrested and gave evidence against him.

In a 2003 sermon, Thompson mentioned that his fishing crew had spent a decade catching and selling juvenile leopard sharks to local pet stores. Spokespeople for the church have denied that the church knew of or condoned Thompson's activities.

In a non-prosecution agreement with the government, the Unification Church agreed to pay $500,000 to a $1.5 million fund set up for the purpose of rehabilitating and restoring marine wildlife habitat in the San Francisco Bay to further protect the leopard shark. $900,000 was added to the fund by the State of California and private environmental foundations. By 2013 leopard sharks were again flourishing in the San Francisco Bay. This was largely credited to these environmental restoration efforts.

== See also ==
- Leopard shark
- List of Unification movement people
- Unification Church
- Unification Church of the United States
- "Six Indicted in Scheme to Poach and Smuggle Protected California Leopard Sharks". Archived from the original on October 14, 2006., United States Department of Justice
- Prosecutors Net Leopard-Shark Smugglers, National Public Radio
- Unification Church to Pay $500,000 Into Wildlife Fund Over Pastor's Shark Poaching Conviction, Associated Press
- Shark poaching will cost Moon's church, Union-Tribune
- Thompson Shark Case, Account by a first hand observer.
