= Unification Theological Seminary =

Private seminary in New York City, New York

HJ Graduate School for Peace and Public Leadership
- Former name: Unification Theological Seminary (1975-2023)
- Type: Private seminary
- Established: 1975
- Religious affiliation: Unification Church
- Location: New York City, New York, United States
- Website: uts.edu

HJ International Graduate School for Peace and Public Leadership is a private Unification Church-affiliated graduate seminary headquartered in Midtown Manhattan, New York City, New York. It was known as Unification Theological Seminary (UTS) from its founding in 1975 until July 2023.

In September 1975, UTS acquired a 250-acre campus, including a former Catholic novitiate dating to 1931 and circa 1886 mansion, in Barrytown, Dutchess County, New York. Its first class entered that year and consisted of 56 MRE students.

The seminary was granted an absolute charter from the State of New York in January 1984 and received accreditation from the Middle States Commission on Higher Education in November 1996.

Following a decline in enrollment and financial challenges, it was sold in January 2024 to nearby Bard College to become the new location of Bard College at Simon's Rock. Since then, all instruction is now conducted through the seminary’s New York City headquarters.

== Students and alumni ==
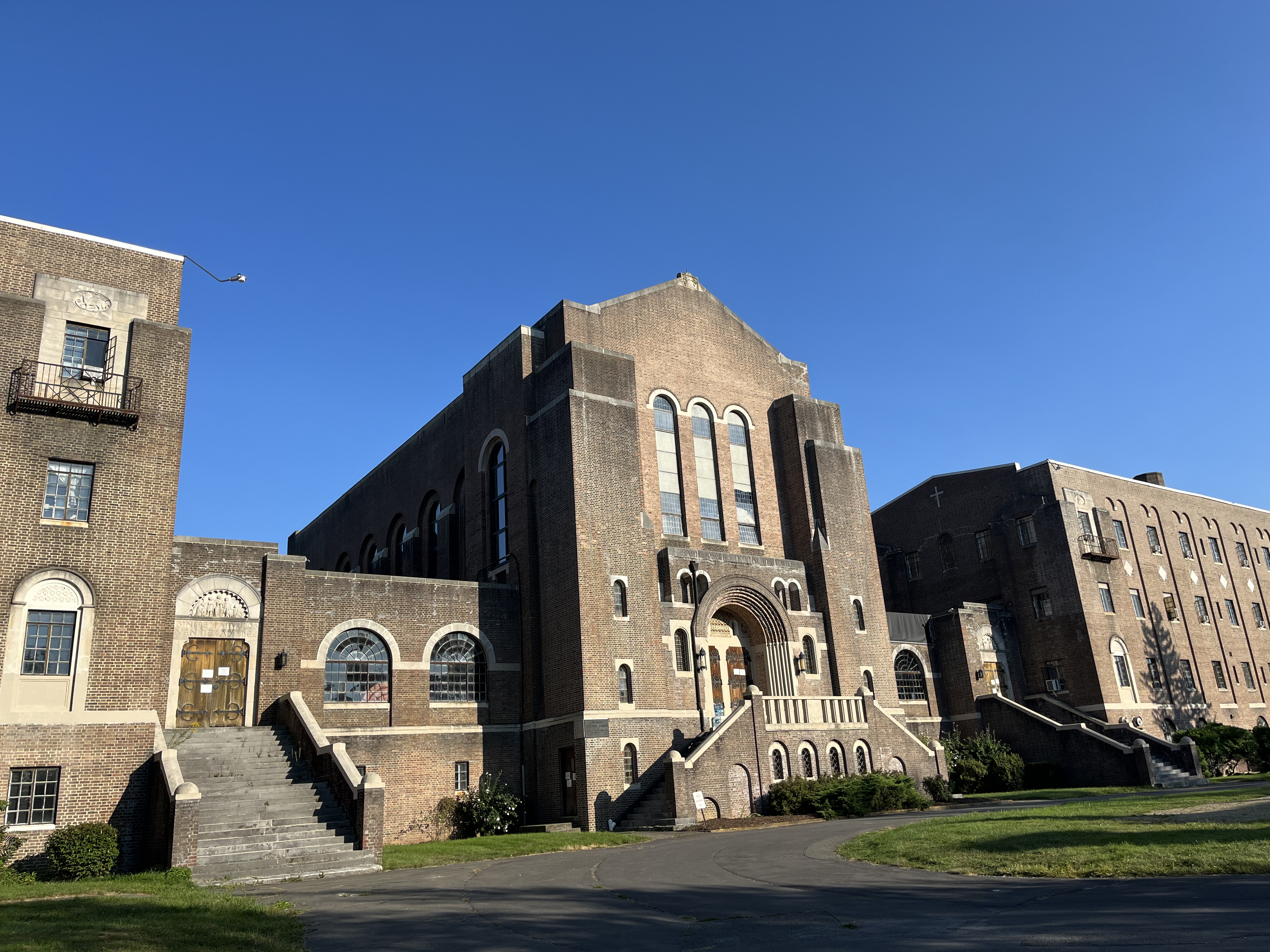
The former campus in Barrytown, New York now Bard College's Massena Campus.

While the majority of UTS students have been Unification Church members, there are also students from other faiths. Historically, the UTS faculty has included academics representing the Jewish, Islamic, and Christian faiths, as well as Unificationist faculty with degrees from Ivy League universities, as well as the Graduate Theological Union, The New School, Vanderbilt University, and Drew University, among others. The seminary has over 125 students enrolled in its three Master degrees and in its Doctor of Ministry (DMin) program. Most Unification Church leaders in the United States hold UTS degrees. UTS graduates have also played major leadership roles in many of the Unification Church-related organizations in the United States, as well as Unification-inspired civil society and corporate entities including the Universal Peace Federation, the Family Federation for World Peace, World Collegiate Association for the Research of Principles (CARP), the American Clergy Leadership Conference, World & I Magazine, Paragon Publishers, the Professors World Peace Academy, Unification Theological Seminary, and the Women’s Federation for World Peace. As of 2022, there are over 1,550 UTS graduates.

== Research and publication ==
Since its inception, the Unification Theological Seminary has served as the principal venue to provide formal, academic religious and theological training for its Church leaders. It has offered courses in New Testament, Old Testament, the Pauline Epistles, Patristics, Hermeneutics, Church History, Apologetics as well as Islam, East Asian Religion, Religious Education, Peace Studies, as well as in the Unification Church’s own canon of Divine Principle, Unification Thought, the Teachings and Writings of Sun Myung Moon and Hak Ja Han Moon and their applications, and other related sources.

== Academics ==
The seminary offers four distinct degree programs:

Program	Duration of the Course	Year Started
Master of Religious Education, MRE	2 years	1975
Master of Divinity, M.Div.	3 years	1980
Master of Arts in Religious Studies, MA	2 years	2011
Doctor of Ministry, D.Min.	3 years	2006

== Presidents ==
No.	Name	Years of service
1	David S.C. Kim, (1915–2011)	1975–1994
2	Theodore Shimmyo	1994–2000
3	Tyler Hendricks, (1948–)	2000–2010
4	Richard A. Panzer	2010–2015
5	Hugh Spurgin	2015–2019
6	Thomas J. Ward	2019–2022

== Notable alumni ==
- Daniel Fefferman, executive director of the International Coalition for Religious Freedom.
- Michael Jenkins, president of U.S. Unification Church (2000–2009)
- Lee Shapiro, documentarian killed while filming in Afghanistan during the Soviet–Afghan War.
- Jonathan Wells (1978), biologist, author and proponent of Intelligent design.
- Andrew Wilson, academic dean of UTS; editor of World Scripture: A Comparative Anthology of Sacred Texts
- Mike Yakawich, member of the Montana House of Representatives

== See also ==
- List of Unification movement people
- Unification Church of the United States
