= Raquel Lebrón =

Paraguayan harpist

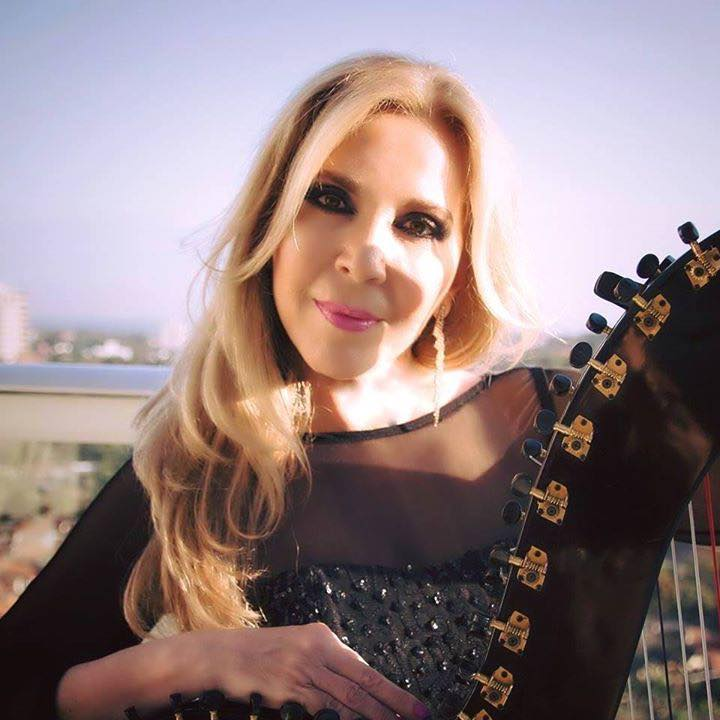

Background information
- Born: 12 February 1954 (age 72); Asunción, Paraguay
- Genres: Classical
- Occupation: Musician
- Instrument: Harp
- Label: BlueCaps
- Awards: Women's Federation for World Peace – Outstanding Paraguayan Women; 2010

Raquel Lebrón (born 12 February 1954) is a Paraguayan harpist. After performing widely in Europe and South America, in 2010 she received a peace prize as an outstanding Paraguayan woman.

== Biography ==
Born in Asunción, Raquel began to study music at the age of seven under Marcial Heffernan Liam Zelaya. She went on to study the harp for 11 years with Santiago Cortesi, María Cristina Gómez and Nicolás Caballero. Lebrón has performed in concerts and recitals in Paraguay, Argentina, Bolivia, Uruguay, Brazil, Canada and Germany. In 1991, she was awarded first prize at the Eisteddfod in Roodepoort, South Africa, for solo folk instrument performance. She played for ARD German Television (1991–92), performing at concerts across Germany. More recent performances have included Hamburg (1995), Berlin (2005) and Heidelberg (2007), as well as Expo '98 in Lisbon, the Paraguayan-Brazilian Cultural Centre in Rio de Janeiro (2000) and the Teatro Colón in Buenos Aires (2002).

Raquel performs regularly in Paraguay, participating in the World Harp Festival since 2008. She demonstrates the adaptability of the Paraguayan harp to all forms of music.

== Awards ==
In 2010, Lebrón received the award for Outstanding Paraguayan Women from the Women's Federation for World Peace.

== Recordings ==
Raquel Lebrón has released several recordings of her music including Melodías en arpa (Melodies on Harp), Clásicos de Folclore Paraguayo (Paraguayan Folklore Classics), Música Internacional con Gran Orquesta (International Music with Full Orchestra) and Polcas Paraguayas en Solo de Arpa (Paraguayan Polkas for Solo Harp).
