= Tom McDevitt =

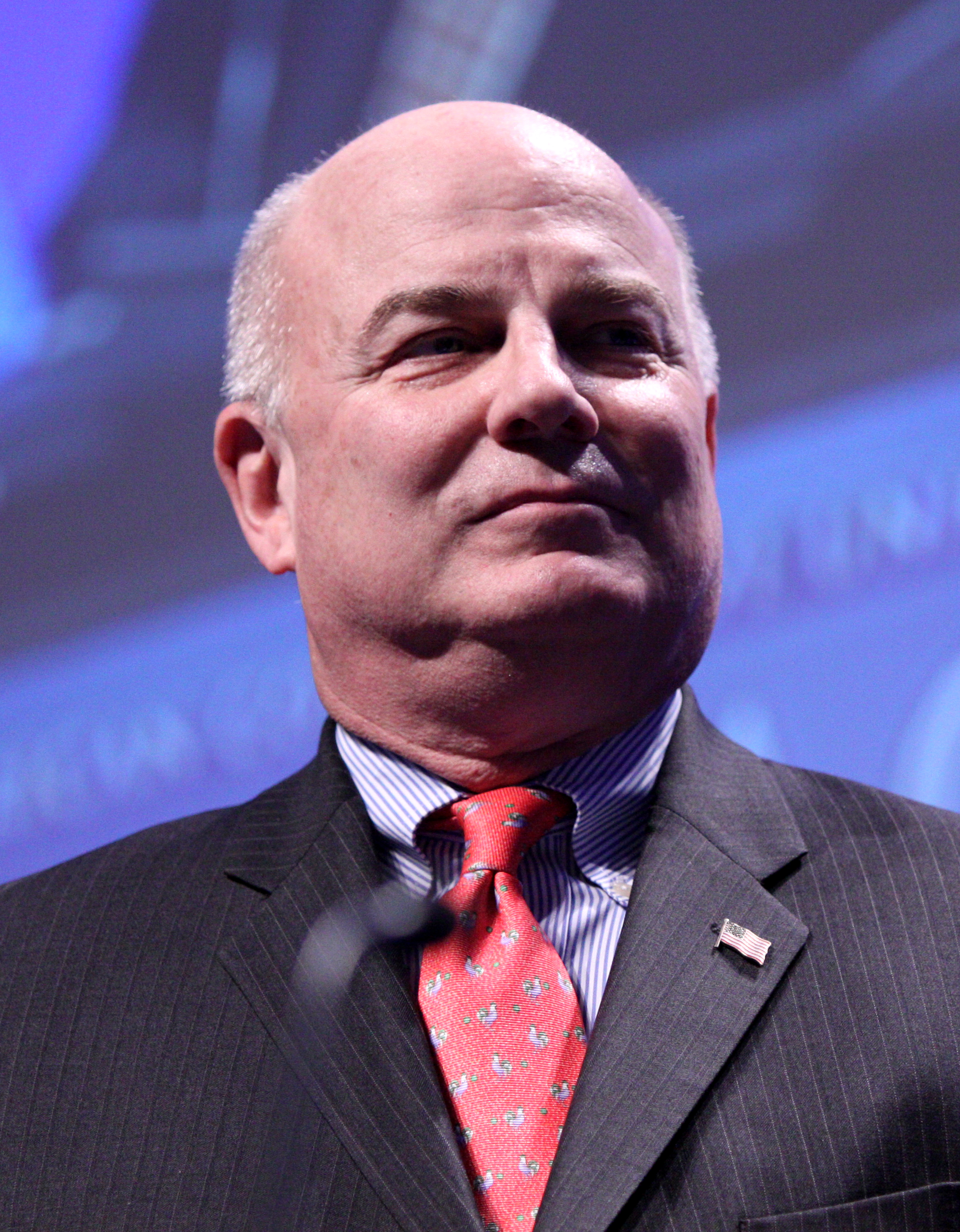
McDevitt in February 2011

Tom McDevitt is the chairman of the board of directors of The Washington Times, a daily newspaper in Washington D.C.

McDevitt is a member of the Unification Church, which indirectly owns The Washington Times. In the early 1980s, he was the pastor of the Unification Church of the United States in Washington D.C. McDevitt's wife of 20 years, Soon Ja, died in 2002. They have five children.
