= Dan Fefferman =

American church leader and activist

- Born: Daniel G. Fefferman
- Education: Unification Theological Seminary; University of California, Berkeley
- Occupations: Executive director, International Coalition for Religious Freedom
- Known for: Leadership roles in Unification Church of the United States
- Children: 2
- Website: ICRF

Daniel G. Fefferman is a church leader and activist for the freedom of religion. He is a member of the Unification Church of the United States, a branch of the international Unification Church founded by Sun Myung Moon in South Korea in 1954.

Fefferman has held several leadership positions in church related organizations. In the 1970s, he was a leader of the National Prayer and Fast Committee, Project Watergate, and the Freedom Leadership Foundation, which were involved in political activism. In 1977, he testified before the Fraser Committee.

Fefferman was leader of the Unification Church in Illinois, regional director for the Unification Church for the Midwestern United States, the headquarters director of Collegiate Association for the Research of Principles (CARP) and editor of the national journal of the Unification Church.

Since 1984, he has been the executive director of the Unification Church affiliated International Coalition for Religious Freedom(ICRF CRF), which was founded in the 1980s and has been active in protesting what it considers to be threats to religious freedom by governmental agencies.

== Early life and family ==
Fefferman became a member of the Unification Church in 1968. After that he obtained degrees from the University of California at Berkeley and from the Unification Theological Seminary. Fefferman is married with two daughters, and lives in Washington, D.C., with his family.

== Unification Church work ==
=== Political activism ===
In 1974, Fefferman was the executive director of the National Prayer and Fast Committee, a group organized by Sun Myung Moon to support Richard Nixon during the Watergate scandal. According to one report Moon had chosen Fefferman (who is Jewish) to become the Prime Minister of Israel at some future time. Fefferman was an official with the Freedom Leadership Foundation, which was also founded by Moon, and deemed a "political arm" of the Unification Church. According to testimony provided by Fefferman to the United States Congress, at a scheduled September 1974 rally by the Freedom Leadership Foundation against the government of Japan, members debated cutting off their fingers as a form of raising dramatic effect, but instead decided on egg throwing. The rally was canceled prior to being carried out.

Fefferman testified in August 1977 before the Fraser Committee, a subcommittee of the United States House of Representatives which investigated possible ties between Sun Myung Moon and the South Korean National Intelligence Service ("KCIA"). Testimony from Fefferman confirmed that he had social ties to officials within the South Korean embassy. Fefferman testified that he had arranged a meeting in 1975 between Republican aide Edwin Feulner of the Heritage Foundation and South Korean Minister Kim Yung Hwan, to potentially put together a group of congressional aides who would travel to South Korea. Hwan was then-station chief for the KCIA. During his testimony, Fefferman refused to answer nine questions from the subcommittee, saying that they violated his constitutional rights to freedom of religion and association. The subcommittee recommended that Fefferman be cited for contempt of Congress. Fefferman, speaking to The Michigan Daily in 1980, said the subcommittee's recommendations were never taken up, and no charges were pressed.

=== Church leadership ===
In 1977, Fefferman served as leader of the Unification Church in the state of Illinois, as well as regional church director for the Midwestern United States. In 1982, he was headquarters director and national president of Collegiate Association for the Research of Principles (CARP), a collegiate organization founded by Moon and church members in 1955. It was described by The Washington Post as "the youth organization of the Rev. Sun Myung Moon's Unification Church", and by the ICSA as "the UC's youth arm". Fefferman was the editor of the national journal of the Unification Church in 1989, and served as chief editor of the first edition of Divine Principle in English, as well as other Unification Church publications.

In 2016, Fefferman gave a presentation at a conference held by CESNUR, a non-profit organization which both studies and advocates for the religious freedom of new religious movements, on the divisions within the Unification Church since Sun Myung Moon's death in 2012.

=== International Coalition for Religious Freedom ===
Since 1984, Fefferman has been the executive director of the Unification Church affiliated organization the International Coalition for Religious Freedom in Virginia, which is active in protesting what it considers to be threats to religious freedom by governmental agencies. In 1999, the International Coalition for Religious Freedom filed a lawsuit in United States district court in Baltimore, Maryland, against a Maryland state task force which was investigating new religious movements on state college campuses. Fefferman commented to The Boston Globe about the case, "The United States has correctly criticized European states for scrutinizing smaller and newer religions through government commissions such as this one. The state of Maryland has been manipulated into engaging in religious McCarthyism by carrying out a biased inquisition into new religious minorities as 'cults'. In 1999 Fefferman defended the rights of Wiccan soldiers in the United States military to practice their faith.

=== Other work ===
In 2000, Fefferman wrote to his colleagues about the Million Family March, planned to be held in Washington, D.C., and sponsored by Moon and Louis Farrakhan, the leader of the Nation of Islam, acknowledging that the two leaders' views differed on multiple issues but shared a view of a "God-centered family". In 2001 Bill Gertz, author and an investigative reporter for The Washington Times, which was owned by the Unification Church, cited Fefferman as a person who "contributed valuable inspiration, advice, help, and support" to Gertz's book Betrayal.

In 2004 Fefferman said that religious persecution of Muslims is probably under reported due to the fact that many victims are refugees, in both Muslim and non-Muslim countries. Fefferman gave a presentation on the Unification Church at a conference of the International Cultic Studies Association in 2004. In 2008 he gave a presentation on the Unification Church at the London School of Economics at a conference sponsored by the organizations INFORM and CESNUR. In 2009 he criticized the government of Kazakhstan for its treatment of religious minorities, including members of the Unification Church.

== See also ==
- List of Unification Church people
- List of Unification Church affiliated organizations
- Religious freedom
- Unification Church political activities
- Unification Church of the United States
