= Lee Shapiro (filmmaker) =

American filmmaker (1949–1987)

Lee Shapiro (1949–1987) was an American documentary filmmaker. His one feature-length film, Nicaragua Was Our Home, was released in 1986. It was filmed in Nicaragua among the Miskito people who were then fighting against Nicaraguan government forces. It features interviews with Miskito people and some non-Miskito clergy who lived among them concerning actions of the government against them, including bombing of villages, shootings, and forced removal of people from their homes. The film was shown on some PBS stations and at the 1986 Sundance Film Festival.

In 1987, Shapiro and fellow filmmaker Jim Lindelof were killed in Afghanistan during the Soviet–Afghan War. The armed group they were traveling with reported that they had been ambushed by military forces of the Soviet Union or the Afghan government. However, the details have been questioned, partly because of the poor reputation of the group's leader, Gulbuddin Hekmatyar. In 1988, both houses of Congress passed a bill recommending that Shapiro and Lindelof, along with journalist Charles Thronton, receive the Presidential Medal of Freedom.

Shapiro was a member of the Unification Church and a graduate of its Unification Theological Seminary, as well as the London Film School and the University of Colorado. He also attended medical school at the University of Oklahoma. His filmmaking was supported by CAUSA International, a church-related anticommunist organization.

In 2006 the documentary film Shadow of Afghanistan, by Suzanne Bauman and Jim Burroughs, was released. It incorporated footage originally shot by Shapiro.

== See also ==
- Anti-communism
- List of Unification Church members
- Unification Church of the United States
