= Frederick Sontag =

American philosopher

- Born: October 2, 1924; Long Beach, California
- Died: June 14, 2009 (aged 84)

Philosophical work
- Era: Contemporary philosophy
- Region: Western philosophy
- School: Existentialism
- Main interests: Existentialism; Metaphysics; Philosophy of Religion; Philosophical Theology

Frederick Earl Sontag (October 2, 1924 – June 14, 2009) was a professor of philosophy and author. He taught at Pomona College in Claremont, California from 1952 to 2009, retiring shortly before his death.

== Biography ==
Sontag served in the U.S. Army during the Second World War, becoming a sergeant. He graduated from Stanford University in 1949 with a B.A. (with great distinction), then attended Yale University where he earned an M.A. in 1951 and a Ph.D. in 1952.

Sontag was the Robert C. Denison Professor of Philosophy at Pomona College, where he worked from 1952 to 2009. He had also been chairman of the department (1960–67 and 1976–77) and chairman of the Committee on Honors Study (1961–70). He also served as a visiting professor at a number of institutions (Union Theological Seminary, 1959–60, Collegio di Sant'Anselmo, Rome, 1966–67, University of Copenhagen, 1972, University of Kyoto, 1974, and East-West Center, Honolulu, 1974). He was the theologian-in-residence at American Church in Paris in 1973 and Fulbright Regional American Professor, East Asian and Pacific Area from 1977 to 1978.

His research interests were existentialism, metaphysics, philosophy of religion, and philosophical theology. Sontag was a minister in the United Church of Christ. He was considered an expert on the Unification Church. In the 1970s he interviewed church founder Sun Myung Moon and church members in Europe, America, and Asia while researching for a book published in 1977.

In 2000, Sontag offered to let a troubled student spend the night at his home. But as he drove the student to his dormitory to pick up some clothes, the student became agitated, drew a knife and stabbed Sontag twice. Sontag testified in the student's defense at his trial in which he was found not guilty by reason of insanity. He said about the incident: "My genes lack something, I don't seem to hold grudges...I believe in restoring relationships."

In a 2004 interview with Pomona College Magazine, singer, actor, songwriter, and former Pomona College student Kris Kristofferson mentioned Sontag as an important influence in his life.

Upon his retirement from Pomona College in May 2009, Sontag was awarded the Pomona College Trustees’ Medal of Merit, as "an extraordinarily magnanimous member of this community." He died of congestive heart failure on June 14, 2009. A research fellowship fund, a gate, a theater, and a residence hall are named in his honor.

== Works ==
- American Life (University Press of America, 2005) ISBN 978-0-7618-3441-0
- A Kierkegaard Handbook (Wipf & Stock Publishers, 2003) ASIN: B001UVYBRG
- The Mysterious Presence: A Spiritual Odyssey (University Press of America, 2001) ASIN: B002A42GCE
- The Descent of Women (Paragon Press, 1997) ISBN 1-55778-719-0
- Truth and Imagination (University Press of America, 1997) ISBN 0-7618-0921-X
- The Acts of Trinity (University Press of America, 1996) ISBN 0-7618-0363-7
- Uncertain Truth (University Press of America, 1995) ISBN 0-8191-9851-X
- Wittgenstein and the Mystical: Philosophy As an Ascetic Practice (An American Academy of Religion Book, 1995) ISBN 1-55540-993-8
- Emotion: Its Role in Understanding and Decision (American University Studies Series V, Philosophy) (Peter Lang Pub Inc, 1990) ISBN 0-8204-1069-1
- The Elements of Philosophy (Scribner, 1984) ASIN: B0028WW64G
- What can God do? (Abingdon Press, 1979) ISBN 0-687-44600-7
- Sun Myung Moon and the Unification Church (Abingdon Press, 1977; Korean translation, Pacific Publishing Company, 1981; Japanese translation, Tuttle-Mori Agency, Inc., 1977; German translation, SINUS-Verlag, Krefeld, 1981) ISBN 0-687-40622-6".
- Love Beyond Pain: Mysticism Within Christianity (Paulist Press, 1977)
- God and America's future (McGrath Pub. Co 1977) ISBN 0-8434-0641-0
- The American Religious Experience: The Roots, Trends and the Future of American Theology, with John Roth Sontag(Harper and Row, 1972) ASIN: B0026958X2
- How Philosophy Shapes Theology: Problems in the Philosophy of Religion (Harper and Row, 1971) ISBN 0-06-046349-X
- The Problems of Metaphysics (Chandler, 1970)
- God, Why Did You Do That? (Westminster, 1970)
- The God of Evil: An Argument from the Existence of the Devil (Harper, 1970) ASIN: B000X77PFI
- The Crisis of Faith: A Protestant Witness in Rome (Doubleday, 1969) ASIN: B0020CM7AW
- The Future of Theology: A Philosophical Basis for Contemporary Protestant Theology (Westminster, 1969) ASIN: B000L311VS
- The Existentialist Prolegomena: To a Future Metaphysics (University of Chicago Press, 1969) ISBN 0-226-76819-8
- Divine Perfection (Harper & Brothers, 1962) ASIN: B001TYXVVQ

== See also ==
Academic study of new religious movements

- American philosophy
- List of American philosophers
