= Dong Moon Joo =

Korean American businessman

Dong Moon Joo is a Korean American businessman. A member of the Unification Church, he is best known as the president of the Unification Church of the United States affiliated newspaper The Washington Times. During the presidency of George W. Bush, Joo had undertaken unofficial diplomatic missions to North Korea in an effort to improve its relationship with the United States.

In 2009 Joo was let go from the Times by its then owner, Hyun Jin Moon. In 2011 he was again serving as president of the Times and visited North Korea, along with Unification Church president Hyung Jin Moon and Pyeonghwa Motors president Sang Kwon Park, to offer condolences on the death of North Korean leader Kim Jong-il. Joo was born in North Korea and is now a citizen of the United States.

== See also ==
- The Washington Times
- Unification Church and North Korea
- Unification Church of the United States
