= Un Jin Moon =

Korean American equestrian

- Born: 1967 (age 58–59)
- Occupation: Equestrian
- Parents: Sun Myung Moon (father); Hak Ja Han (mother)

Korean name
- Hangul: 문은진
- RR: Mun Eunjin
- MR: Mun Ŭnjin

Un Jin Moon (born 1967) is a Korean American equestrian and a daughter of Unification Church founder Sun Myung Moon. She was chosen by the Korean Athletic Committee to participate in the equestrian competition of the Asian Games.

Moon's first marriage to Jin Hun Park was arranged by her parents and resulted in two children. She left the marriage and moved to Virginia. She sought custody of her children. Moon's interest in horses led her father to build her a $10 million riding facility. In 1998, she remarried, to Rodney Jenkins, Hall of Fame Grand Prix Show Jumper who, in retirement, was a successful thoroughbred racehorse trainer in Maryland.
