= Sun Myung Moon and the Unification Church =

1977 book by Frederick Sontag

- First edition
- Author: Frederick Sontag
- Language: English
- Subject: Unification Church
- Genre: nonfiction
- Publisher: Abingdon Press
- Publication date: 1977
- Publication place: United States
- Media type: Hardcover
- Pages: 224
- ISBN: 0-687-40622-6

Sun Myung Moon and the Unification Church is a nonfiction book about the Unification Church and its founder and leader, Sun Myung Moon. It was written by Frederick Sontag, a professor of philosophy at Pomona College and a minister in the United Church of Christ., and published by Abingdon Press in 1977. Sontag spent 10 months visiting church members in North America, Europe, and Asia as well as interviewing Moon at his home in New York State. The book also provides an overview of Unification Church beliefs.

In an interview with UPI Sontag compared the Unification Church (founded in 1954) with the Church of Jesus Christ of Latter-day Saints and said that he expected its practices to conform more to mainstream American society as its members become more mature. He added that he did not want to be considered an apologist for the church but a close look at its theology is important: "They raise some incredibly interesting issues."
