= Hyung Jin Moon =

South Korean religious leader (born 1979)

- Born: Hyung Jin Sean Moon; September 26, 1979 (age 47); Tarrytown, New York, U.S.
- Education: Harvard University (BLA)
- Spouse: Yeon Ah Lee Moon
- Parents: Sun Myung Moon (father); Hak Ja Han (mother)

Korean name
- Hangul: 문형진
- Hanja: 文亨進
- RR: Mun Hyeongjin
- MR: Mun Hyŏngjin

Hyung Jin Moon (Korean: 문형진; born September 26, 1979), also known as Sean Moon, is an American minister, who along with his wife Yeon Ah Lee Moon founded the Pennsylvania-based World Peace and Unification Sanctuary Church (also known as Rod of Iron Ministries). The Sanctuary Church is a schismatic sect, which was founded by Hyung Jin Moon. and is independent from Unification Church.

The Southern Poverty Law Center called Hyung Jin Moon an "anti-LGBT cult leader" in January 2018. Moon and some Sanctuary Church members were accused of organizing in part the 2021 United States Capitol riot.

== Early life and education ==
Hyung Jin Sean Moon was born on September 26, 1979, in Tarrytown, New York. He is the youngest son of Sun Myung Moon, the founder of the Unification movement, and Hak Ja Han. He attended the Hackley School until college. He earned a Bachelor of Liberal Arts degree from Harvard Extension School. At the Harvard Center for the Study of World Religions, he met the leader of the Jogye Order of Korean Buddhism, Bub Jang, and pursued an interest in Buddhism. He also practiced Tibetan Buddhism, and for a time lived in a Roman Catholic monastery.

== Religious career ==
=== Unification Church ===
In April 2008, Sun Myung Moon (then 88 years old) appointed Hyung Jin Moon to be the International President of the Family Federation for World Peace and Unification (FFWPU). Hyung Jin Moon and members of his church believe that a coronation ceremony with his father in 2009 made him heir and successor. Under his leadership, the Family Federation for World Peace was changed to the Unification Church. He also introduced new practices like spiritual energy hand movements.

In 2011, Hyung Jin Moon visited North Korea to express condolences on the death of Kim Jong Il. In 2011 in Pyongyang, to mark the 20th anniversary of Sun Myung Moon's visit to North Korea, de jure President Kim Yong-nam hosted Hyung Jin Moon in the official residence. The latter donated 600 tons of flour to North Korean children of North Pyongan Province, the birthplace of Sun Myung Moon. After the 2011 Tōhoku earthquake and tsunami, he donated $1.7 million to the Japanese Red Cross.

After Sun Myung Moon died in 2012, Hyung Jin Moon and his mother began expressing open differences. Hyung Jin was removed by his mother from various positions from 2013, and eventually taken down as International President of the Family Federation for World Peace, and replaced by his sister Sun Jin Moon. The Family Federation for World Peace now considers Hyung Jin Moon's church a "breakaway organization" and most of the changes led by Hyung Jin in the Unification movement were dismissed after his removal.

=== Sanctuary Church ===
Hyung Jin Moon and members of his church have publicly criticized his mother Hak Ja Han for changing the theological foundations of his father's teachings and elevating her own status. This led Hyung Jin and his wife to separate from the movement and establish a local offshoot sect named World Peace and Unification Sanctuary Church in early 2013. The church, also called Rod of Iron Ministries, officially opened in January 2015.

In 2015, Hyung Jin Moon began renouncing his mother as the Whore of Babylon, saying she was no longer a "True Mother". He also began teaching that Hyun Shil Kang, one of Sun Myung Moon's first disciples, was now True Mother instead, as his spirit had married her. He and his wife Yeon Ah Lee also began assuming the titles 'Second King' and 'Second Queen' respectively.

Hyung Jin Moon is backed by his elder brother Kook Jin Justin Moon, who effectively serves as assistant pastor of the church and owns Kahr Arms, a small arms manufacturer.

By 2018, Hyung Jin Moon began wearing a crown of bullets on his head and expressed of a more militant and pro-gun rights ideology. Sanctuary Church also went by the name Rod of Iron Ministries and performed religious rituals that heavily involved the AR-15 semiautomatic rifle. In October 2019, members of the World Peace and Unification Sanctuary were invited to "show their willingness to defend their families, communities and nation" by bringing their semi-auto rifles to a service in which their weapons were blessed.

In 2021, Moon and Sanctuary Church bought and moved to a compound 40 miles from Waco, Texas, the site of the Waco siege. Upon moving to the compound, they continued to espouse a highly militant ideology. Later that year it was reported that Moon and Sanctuary Church had bought a 130-acre property in Grainger County, Tennessee to serve as the church's retreat center.

== Political activity ==
After the founding of Rod of Iron Ministries, Moon publicly aligned with conservative politicians and other far-right media figures. Moon espoused strong support for President Donald Trump during and after Trump's presidency. Moon endorsed the "Big Lie" that the 2020 presidential election was stolen from Trump. Moon and other members of Sanctuary Church participated in the January 6, 2021 United States Capitol attack. Moon faced no criminal charges from his involvement in the January 6 riots.

=== Gun ritual controversies ===
Hyung Jin Moon's church, World Peace and Unification Sanctuary Church in Newfoundland, Pennsylvania gained national attention in early 2018 for holding a marriage vows renewal ceremony that asked participants to bring their AR-15 rifles. Hyung Jin Moon has likened the AR-15 rifles to the biblical "rod of iron". Neighbors of the church came out to protest the insensitivity of having the AR-15 rifles at the event so soon after the Parkland, Florida shooting that killed 17. To address concerns voiced by parents of an elementary school nearby, the Wallenpaupack Area School District relocated students for the day.

== See also ==
- List of Unification movement people
- Unification Church of the United States
