= Hak Ja Han =

Korean religious leader (born 1943)

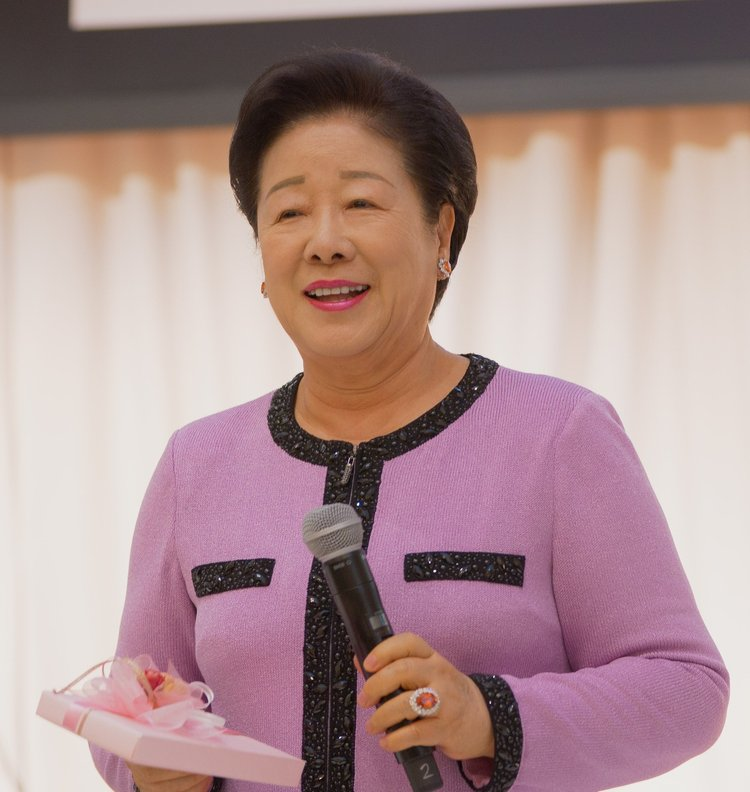
- Han, c. 2024
- Born: February 10, 1943 (age 83); Anju, Heian'nan Province, Korea, Empire of Japan (now Anju, North Korea)
- Occupation: religious leader
- Spouse: Sun Myung Moon (m. 1960; died 2012)
- Children: 14, including: In Jin Moon; Heung Jin Moon; Un Jin Moon; Hyun Jin Moon; Kook Jin Moon; Hyung Jin Moon

Korean name
- Hangul: 한학자
- Hanja: 韓鶴子
- RR: Han Hakja
- MR: Han Hakcha
- Criminal information
- Status: Incarcerated
- Criminal charges: Violation of the Improper Solicitation and Graft Act; Bribery; Violation of the Political Parties Act; Violation of the Political Funds Act; Evidence tampering
- Penalty: Violations of the Political Funds Act: 1 year imprisonment; Violations of the Improper Solicitation and Graft Act: 1 year imprisonment

Details
- Date apprehended: 23 September 2025

Hak Ja Han Moon (Korean: 한학자; Hanja: 韓鶴子; born February 10, 1943) is a Korean religious leader. Her late husband Sun Myung Moon was the founder of the Unification Church. Han and Moon were married in April 1960 and have 10 living children and over 30 grandchildren. In 1992, she established the Women's Federation for World Peace, and traveled the world speaking on its behalf. Since her husband's death, she has assumed leadership of the Unification Church, whose followers call her "True Mother" and "Mother of Peace". In 2025, she was arrested on bribery charges. On August 31, 2026 she was given a two-year sentence instead of the 13-year prison term requested earlier by special prosecutor Min Joong-ki.

== Personal life and family ==
Han, whose mother later became a follower of Sun Myung Moon, was born on February 10, 1943. Han attended an all-girls high school in Korea but did not go on to college. She speaks Japanese and English as well as Korean. In April 1960, at the age of 17, Han, by then a member of the Unification Church, married 40 year-old Moon. Han has 14 children, 10 of whom are still living, and as of 2011 has 38 grandchildren.

On July 19, 2008, Han along with her husband and 14 others, including several of their children and grandchildren, were slightly injured when a Sikorsky S-92 helicopter owned by the movement crashed during an emergency landing and burst into flames in Gapyeong. Han and all 15 others were treated at the nearby Unification Church-affiliated Cheongshim Hospital.

== Role in the Unification Church ==
Some Unification Church members believe that Han and Moon's wedding established a "holy marriage", and also consider it to be a holy day, called "True Parents Day," as well as what members refer to as the "True Family." It is believed by the members to be the beginning of a new Completed Testament Age and to have fulfilled the prophesied Marriage of the Lamb in the Revelation of John. According to Church Unification members, Han and Moon are together believed to be the new messiahs. The Moons are regarded by members to be the "True Parents" of humanity and are addressed by its followers as the True Father and True Mother. Members have also referred to Han as "the Bride of Christ" and the perfect woman. She is seen within the Unification Church as the Mother of humankind, the final chosen of God. Han and Moon are also seen as the exemplars of the God-centered existence by members. In Unification Church services, members bow down in respect for Moon and Han, when they are present, and to representative pictures of them when they are not.

In 1962, Moon and Han founded the Little Angels Children's Folk Ballet of Korea, a girls Korean folk ballet company meant to promote a positive perception of South Korea. In 1984, Han spoke at a Unification Church sponsored academic conference in Washington, D.C. to a crowd of 240 which included professors from Harvard, Princeton, Stanford, University of Michigan and the Sorbonne in Paris.

In 1993, U.S. Senator Trent Lott supported the bill True Parents Day in the U.S. Senate and in 1995 U.S. President Bill Clinton signed a bill into law called Parents Day; according to this law, children are to honor their parents on this day. In 1993, U.S. Senator Orrin Hatch introduced Han to a crowd at Capitol Hill; she stated at the event that she and Moon are the first True Parents. Moon was in the audience watching her speech, along with members of the United States Senate and United States House of Representatives.

=== Wedding ceremonies ===
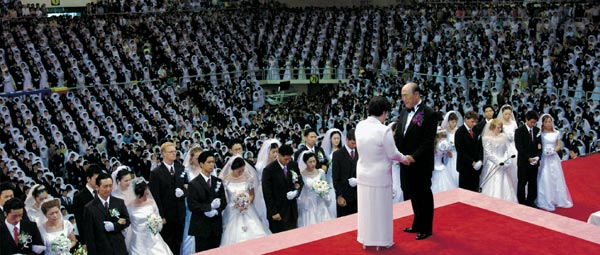
Mass wedding ceremony conducted by Han and Moon.

Han and Moon together presided over the mass wedding ceremonies for which the Unification Church is noted. In 1997, they donned crowns and gold-trimmed robes to lead a mass wedding and marriage rededication ceremony in Washington, D.C. for 20,000 couples, 2,500 of them Unification Church members whose marriages had been arranged by Moon. Ministers of other religions acted as "co-officiators." In 1997, Han presided with her husband over a marriage affirmation ceremony for 28,000 couples, some married and some newly engaged, in New York City. During the ceremony Han and Moon sprinkled holy water on the couples.

=== Women's Federation for World Peace ===
In 1992, Han established the Women's Federation for World Peace with the support of many Unification Church members, and traveled the world speaking at conventions on its behalf. Its purpose is to encourage women to work more actively in promoting peace in their communities and greater society, and it includes 143 member countries. Han organized a conference in Tokyo in 1993, which was the first anniversary of the federation. The keynote speaker was former Second Lady of the United States Marilyn Tucker Quayle, and in a speech at the event Han spoke positively of Quayle's humanitarian work.

In 1993, Han traveled to 20 cities in the United States promoting the Women's Federation for World Peace, as well as to 12 countries. At a stop in Salt Lake City, Utah she told attendants: "If a family is not centered on God's ideal of love, there will be conflict among the members of that family. Without God's love as an absolute center, such a family will ultimately break down. A nation of such families will also decline." Her 1993 speeches in the United States focused on increasing violence in the U.S., and the degradation of the family unit.

In 1995, Han spoke at a federation event in Japan with former United States president George H. W. Bush. Han spoke after Bush's speech and praised Bush, crediting him for the decline of communism and saying that he must save America from "the destruction of the family and moral decay."

=== Increasing influence ===
In 1992, Moon increased Han's position of authority within the Unification Church and announced "True Mother was elevated to True Father's level horizontally." Han has been Moon's successor and designated as leader of the Unification Church since 1993. Massimo Introvigne of the Center for Studies on New Religions writes in The Unification Church (2000):

The issue of succession is now of fundamental importance. The Reverend Moon will be eighty years old (by Korean age calculations, he turned eighty in 1999) in 2000. Mrs. Moon is fifty-seven years old. Since 1992 she has taken a more visible role, particularly in three world speaking tours in 1992, 1993, and 1999. Mrs. Moon has also spoken on Capitol Hill, at the United Nations, and in other parliaments around the world. Her relative youth and the respect with which she is held by the membership may be a point of stability for the Unification movement.

George D. Chryssides predicted, in his book Exploring New Religions (2001), that Han would lead the Unification Church and preside over Blessing ceremonies after Moon's death, since she would then be "the remaining True Parent."

In 2003, over 8,000 Unification Church members attended a ceremony in South Korea in which Han and Moon were remarried. This was said to be the fulfillment of the Marriage Supper of the Lamb written about in the Apocalypse of John. In 2010 National Public Radio reported that Unification Church services in the United States invoked the name of Han along with Moon in their opening greetings to congregants. In that same year, Forbes reported that Han was living in South Korea with her husband while their children took more responsibility for the day-to-day leadership of the Unification Church and its affiliated organizations.

After Sun Myung Moon's death in 2012, Han became the leader of the Family Federation for World Peace and Unification.

=== Family Federation for World Peace ===
In 1996, Han went on a world tour, speaking on behalf of the Family Federation for World Peace. Her speeches were given in cities across the United States, as well as countries including Korea, Japan, Italy, and 16 other countries in South America and Central America. In July 1996 she spoke at the Family Federation for World Peace's Inaugural World Convention at the National Building Museum in Washington, D.C. Han's closing address, called the "Founder's Address", was the climax of the proceedings.

=== Coronation ceremony ===
On March 23, 2004, Moon and Han were honored at an Ambassadors for Peace awards banquet held by the Interreligious and International Federation for World Peace (which is sponsored by the Unification Church) in a United States federal office building in Washington, D.C. It was called a "Crown of Peace" ceremony. At the event Moon stated that he was the Messiah. Over 12 United States lawmakers were in attendance. The event was criticized by some as a possible violation of the principle of separation of church and state in the United States.

=== Universal Peace Federation ===
In 2006, Han spoke in New Zealand on behalf of the Universal Peace Federation and called for traditional families, religious and cross-cultural tolerance, and a "peace tunnel" across the Bering Strait (Bering Strait crossing) connecting Russia and the United States. In 2019 she spoke at a rally in Japan and called for greater understanding and cooperation between the Pacific Rim nations. In 2020 Han spoke at a UPF sponsored in-person and virtual rally for Korean unification which drew about one million attendees.

=== Peace Starts with Me ===
Hak Ja Han is the founder of the peace movement "Peace Starts with Me." The Peace Starts With Me rallies are co-sponsored by the Family Federation for World Peace and Unity (FFWPU) and the American Clergy Leadership Conference (ACLC). The first rally was held in 2017 in Madison Square Garden.

=== Rally of hope ===
Rally of Hope is a series of summits, real and virtual, that began in August 2020, when the COVID-19 pandemic made large in-person gatherings impossible. At each Rally of Hope, global leaders raised important topics, such as the COVID-19 pandemic, poverty, environmental pollution, religious freedom, honoring Korean War veterans, and international security.

Former U.S. President Donald Trump spoke about the security situation on the Korean Peninsula at the Rally of Hope event, a conference organized by Hak Ja Han.

Ban Ki-moon, former Secretary General of the UN, Newt Gingrich, former speaker of the U.S. House of Representatives, President of Senegal Macky Sall, Niger Prime Minister Rafini, Cambodian Prime Minister Hun Sen and other world leaders participated in the virtual Rally of Hope 2020 entitled World Rally of Hope: Building and Renewing Our Nations in the Post-Covid-19 World: Interdependence, Mutual Prosperity and Universal Values.

=== Leadership and Good Governance Award ===
The Leadership and Good Governance Award is given to those who demonstrate excellence in leadership, along with moral and spiritual principles.

=== World Summit ===
The 2022 World Summit was sponsored by the UPF and the Kingdom of Cambodia. The Summit brought together world leaders to discuss peace on the Korean Peninsula. Hak Ja Han, co-founder of the UPF, hosted the summit, co-chaired by Cambodian Prime Minister Hun Sen and former UN Secretary-General Ban Ki-moon. This summit was a continuation of the summit in February and the "Seoul Resolution" signed by former UN Secretary General Ban Ki-moon and Cambodian Prime Minister Hun Sen, which called for the creation of a united Korea as one nation with two states.

=== Little Angels ===
Little Angels Children's Folk Ballet of Korea is a children's folklore ballet group of the Unification Church, founded by Sun Myung Moon and Hak Ja Han Moon.

=== Think Tank 2022 ===
Han helped organize Think Tank 2022, a peace forum in which expert working groups connected with international UPF associations and led peace-building initiatives such as the UN Peace Park in the demilitarized zone between the two Koreas, the construction of the Korea-Japan undersea tunnel, helping to reunite separated Korean families and other initiatives for peace.

=== International Association of Parliamentarians for Peace ===
Hak Ja Han founded the International Association of Parliamentarians for Peace (IAPP) with the aim of gathering parliamentarians from all over the world, who, together with representatives of religious organizations and the civil sector, should work to build peace in the world and solve local, national and global problems.

=== Sunhak Peace Prize ===
The Sunhak Peace Prize was proposed by Hak Ja Han months after her husband's death. The name of the prize is derived from both their names.

== 2025 bribery charges ==
On September 23, 2025, following a Seoul court hearing, Han Hak-ja was arrested on bribery charges alleging she had given two Chanel bags and a diamond necklace, together worth 80 million won ($57,900; £42,500) to former South Korea first lady Kim Keon Hee. According to Reuters, "Han denied all charges, arguing that any contacts with politicians or provision of money and gifts were the unauthorized actions of a former Unification Church official, driven by his personal political ambitions."

Prosecutors sought a 13-year sentence. However, on August 31, 2026 she was given a two-year sentence. Although she had been permitted to leave jail for medical treatment, the court determined on Nov. 3rd that she had made an unauthorized departure from hospital where she had been residing; accordingly, they revoked her bail.

== See also ==
- List of Unification movement people
- Unification Church of the United States
