= Unification Church =

International new religious movement

Family Federation for World Peace and Unification (Unification Church) 세계평화통일가정연합
- Official emblem
- Abbreviation: FFWPU, UC
- Classification: New religious movement
- Scripture: Bible; Divine Principle
- Acting Leader: Hak Ja Han
- Region: Worldwide
- Headquarters: 12F Dowon Building; 292-20 Dohwa-dong; Mapo-gu; Seoul, South Korea
- Founder: Sun Myung Moon
- Origin: May 1, 1954; Seoul, South Korea
- Separated from: Christianity
- Members: ~10,000,000 (2022, self-reported)
- Other names: Unification Movement; Holy Spirit Association for the Unification of World Christianity (세계기독교통일신령협회); Unificationists; Moonies; Moon sect
- Official website: familyfed.org

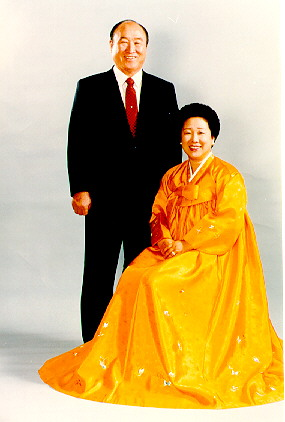
Sun Myung Moon and Hak Ja Han, founders of the Unification Church

The Unification Church (Korean: 통일교; RR: Tongilgyo), officially the Family Federation for World Peace and Unification (FFWPU; 세계평화통일가정연합; Segyepyeonghwatong Ilgajeong Yeonhab), is an Abrahamic monotheistic new religious movement, whose members are called Unificationists or sometimes informally Moonies. The Unification Church was founded in 1954 by Sun Myung Moon in Seoul, South Korea, as the Holy Spirit Association for the Unification of World Christianity (HSA-UWC; 세계기독교통일신령협회; Segyegidoggyotong Ilsinlyeonghyeobhoe); in 1994, the organization changed its name to the FFWPU. It has a presence in approximately 100 countries. The FFWPU's leader is Hak Ja Han, Moon's wife; Moon had previously co-led it until his death. The couple's followers honor them with the title "True Parents".

The book Divine Principle informs the beliefs of the Unification Church. Moon regarded himself the Second Coming of Christ and taught that he was appointed to complete Jesus Christ's unfinished business, which he claimed was left incomplete due to the crucifixion. This mission included establishing a new ideal family, and a larger human lineage, free from sin. The Unification Church is well known for its mass weddings, known as Blessing ceremonies. Its members have founded, owned and supported related organizations in business, education, politics and more. It has been referred to as South Korean nationalist. Its involvement in politics also includes anti-communism and support for Korean reunification.

The Unification Church has been accused of excessive financial exploitation of its members. It has been criticized for its teachings and for its social and political influence, with critics calling it a dangerous cult, a political powerhouse, and a business empire. In 2025, Han was arrested due to her links to Yoon Suk Yeol and his wife, Kim Keon Hee. In March 2026, the Tokyo High Court upheld a 2025 decision ordering the Unification Church to dissolve in Japan; in June 2026, Japan's Supreme Court confirmed the decision.

== Popular terminologies ==
Moon did not originally intend to establish a separate church or denomination, and did not give his group of followers its official name, Holy Spirit Association for the Unification of World Christianity (세계 기독교 통일 신령 협회; Segye Gidoggyo Tong-il Sinryeong Hyeobhoe), until 1954. The informal name "Unification Church" (통일교; Tongilgyo) has been commonly used by members, the public and the news media. By 2018, the term "Unification Movement" was also widely used.

Moonies, the colloquial term for members, was first used in 1974 by some American media outlets. In the 1980s and 1990s, the Unification Church of the United States undertook an extensive public relations campaign against the use of the word by the news media. Many Unification Church members consider the word "Moonie" derogatory, despite originally being received neutrally. In other contexts, it is not always considered pejorative, as Unification Church members have used the word – including the president of the Unification Theological Seminary David Kim, Bo Hi Pak, Moon's aide and president of Little Angels Children's Folk Ballet of Korea, and Moon himself.

Moon and his wife, Hak Ja Han, are regarded by Unificationists as the "True Father" and "True Mother," respectively, and as "True Parents" collectively.

== History ==
Emblem of the HSA-UWC

=== Background and origins ===
On February 25, 1920, Moon was born Mun Yong-myeong in Sangsa-ri (상사리; 上思里), Deogun-myon (덕언면), Jeongju-gun, North P'yŏng'an Province (now part of North Korea), at a time when Korea was under Japanese rule. His birthday was recorded as January 6 by the traditional lunar calendar (February 25, 1920, according to the Gregorian Calendar). Around 1930, his family, who followed traditional Confucianist beliefs, converted to Christianity and joined a Presbyterian Church, where he later taught Sunday school.

In 1945, Moon attended the Israel Monastery (Israel Jesus Church near Seoul) with his wife, Choi Sun-Kil (최선길; 崔先吉; Choe Seon-gil), to learn the teachings of Kim Baek-moon, including his book The Fundamental Principles of Christianity (基督敎根本原理 drafted March 2, 1946, published March 2, 1958). After World War II and the Japanese rule ended in 1945, Moon began preaching. In 1946, Moon traveled alone to Pyongyang in Communist-ruled North Korea. He was arrested on allegations of spying for South Korea and given a five-year sentence to the Hŭngnam labor camp.

=== Holy Spirit Association for the Unification of World Christianity (1954–1994) ===
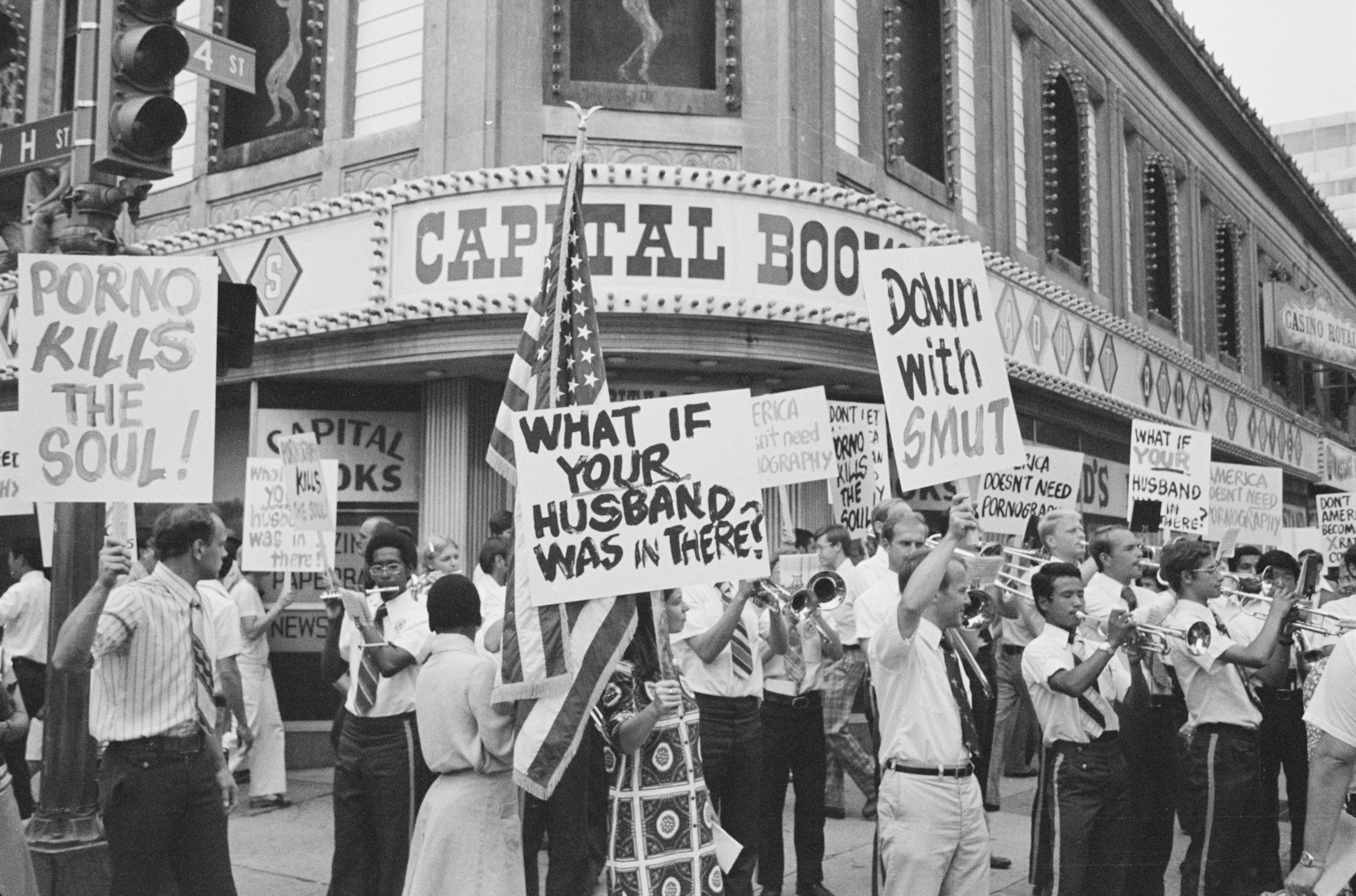
Members of the Unification Church picketing a pornographic bookstore in Washington, D.C., 1976

Moon founded the Holy Spirit Association for the Unification of World Christianity (HSA-UWC) in Seoul on May 1, 1954. It expanded rapidly in South Korea and, by the end of 1955, had 30 centers nationwide. The HSA-UWC expanded throughout the world, with most members living in South Korea, Japan, the Philippines and other nations in East Asia. In the 1970s, American HSA-UWC members were noted for raising money for Unification Church projects.

In 1955 the HSA-UWC founded The Collegiate Association for the Research of Principles (CARP; 대학원리연구회). According to CARP's website, its goal is to promote "intercultural, interracial, and international cooperation through the Unification world view". J. Isamu Yamamoto states in Unification Church: "At times, CARP has been very subtle about its association with the Unification Church; however, the link between the two has always been strong since the purpose of both is to spread Moon's teachings."

The HSA-UWC also sent missionaries to Europe. They entered Czechoslovakia in 1968 and remained underground until the 1990s. Unification movement activity in South America began in the 1970s with missionary work. Later, the HSA-UWC made large investments in civic organizations and business projects, including an international newspaper. Starting in the 1990s, the HSA-UWC expanded in Russia and other former communist nations. Hak Ja Han, Moon's wife, made a radio broadcast to the nation from the State Kremlin Palace. As of 1994, the HSA-UWC had about 5,000 members in Russia. About 500 Russian students had been sent to the US to participate in 40-day workshops.

Moon moved to the United States in 1971, although he remained a citizen of the Republic of Korea. In the 1970s, he gave a series of public speeches in the United States, including one in Madison Square Garden in New York City in 1974; two in 1976 in Yankee Stadium in New York City; and one near the Washington Monument in Washington, D.C., where he spoke on "God's Hope for America" to 300,000 people. In 1975, the HSA-UWC held one of the largest peaceful gatherings in history, with 1.2 million people in Yeouido, South Korea. In the 1970s, the Unification Church, along with some other new religious movements, became a target of the anti-cult movement. Activists have accused the movement of having "brainwashed" its members. In 1976, American Unification Church president Neil Albert Salonen met with Senator Bob Dole to defend the HSA-UWC against charges made by its critics, including the parents of some members.

The Unification Church's involvement in the seafood industry began at the direction of Moon, who ordered an expansion into "the oceanic providence". In 1976 and 1977 the Church invested nearly a million dollars into the United States seafood industry. Moon delivered a speech in 1980 entitled "The Way of Tuna," in which he claimed that "After we build the boats, we catch the fish and process them for the market, and then have a distribution network. This is not just on the drawing board; I have already done it." and declared himself the "king of the ocean." He also suggested that they could get around the recently imposed 200 nautical miles exclusive economic zone by marrying American and Japanese members, allowing the Japanese ones to become American citizens, because once married, "we are not foreigners; therefore Japanese brothers, particularly those matched to Americans, are becoming ..... leaders for fishing and distribution." He also declared that "Gloucester is almost a Moonie town now!"

In 1976 UC members founded News World Communications, an international news media corporation. Its first two newspapers, The News World (later renamed the New York City Tribune) and the Spanish-language Noticias del Mundo, were published in New York from 1976 until the early 1990s. In 1982, The New York Times described News World as "the newspaper unit of the Unification Church". Moon's son, Hyun Jin Moon, is its chairman of the board. News World Communications owns United Press International, The World and I, Tiempos del Mundo (Latin America), The Segye Ilbo (South Korea), The Sekai Nippo (Japan), the Zambezi Times (South Africa), and The Middle East Times (Egypt). Until 2008, it published the Washington, D.C.–based newsmagazine Insight on the News. Until 2010, it also owned The Washington Times. On November 2, 2010, Sun Myung Moon and a group of former Times editors purchased the paper from News World.

Starting in the 1980s, Moon instructed HSA-UWC members to take part in a program called "Home Church" in which they reached out to neighbors and community members through public service. In April 1990, Moon visited the Soviet Union and met with President Mikhail Gorbachev. Moon expressed support for the political and economic transformations underway in the Soviet Union. At the same time, the movement was expanding into formerly communist nations. The Women's Federation for World Peace(세계평화여성연합, WFWP) was founded in 1992 by Hak Ja Han. Its stated purpose is to encourage women to work more actively to promote peace in their communities and society. It has members in 143 countries.

=== Family Federation for World Peace and Unification (1994–present) ===
On May 1, 1994 (the 40th anniversary of the founding of the HSA-UWC), Moon declared that the era of the HSA-UWC had ended and inaugurated a new organization: the Family Federation for World Peace and Unification (FFWPU) would include HSA-UWC members and members of other religious organizations working toward common goals, especially on issues of sexual morality and reconciliation between people of different religions, nations and races. The FFWPU co-sponsored Blessing ceremonies in which thousands of couples from other churches and religions were given the marriage blessing previously given only to HSA-UWC members.

In the 1980s and 1990s, the Church's businesses expanded greatly and encountered significant success, leading to it becoming wealthy despite its declining number of members. In 1991 Moon announced that members should return to their hometowns, to undertake apostolic work there. Massimo Introvigne, who has studied the Unification Church and other new religious movements, said that this confirmed that full-time membership was no longer considered crucial to church members.

In 1994, The New York Times recognized the movement's political influence, saying it was "a theocratic powerhouse that is pouring foreign fortunes into conservative causes in the United States". In 1998, the Egyptian newspaper Al-Ahram criticized Moon's "ultra-right leanings" and argued that his ownership of The Washington Times and connections with conservative political figures placed him within the broader conservative movement aligned with the Israeli right. The paper also suggested that Moon had a personal relationship with conservative Israeli Prime Minister Benjamin Netanyahu. In 1995, former U.S. President George H. W. Bush and his wife, Barbara Bush, spoke at an FFWPU event in the Tokyo Dome. Bush told the gathering: "If as president I could have done one thing to have helped the country more, it would have been to do a better job in finding a way, either through speaking out or through raising a moral standard, to strengthen the American family." Hak Ja Han, the main speaker, credited her husband with bringing about the Fall of Communism and declared that he must save America from "the destruction of the family and moral decay."

In 2000, Moon founded the World Association of Non-Governmental Organizations (WANGO), which describes itself as "a global organization whose mission is to serve its member organizations, strengthen and encourage the non-governmental sector as a whole, increase public understanding of the non-governmental community, and provide the mechanism and support needed for NGOs to connect, partner and multiply their contributions to solve humanity's basic problems." It has been criticized for promoting conservatism in contrast to some of the ideals of the United Nations.

In 2003, Korean FFWPU members started a political party in South Korea, "The Party for God, Peace, Unification, and Home" (천주평화통일가정당). An inauguration declaration stated the new party would focus on preparing for Korean reunification by educating the public about God and peace. An FFWPU official said that similar political parties would be started in Japan and the United States. Since 2003, the FFWPU-related Universal Peace Federation's Middle East Peace Initiative has been organizing group tours of Israel and Palestine to promote understanding, respect and reconciliation among Jews, Muslims and Christians.

=== Moon's death and divisions within the Unification Church ===
On August 15, 2012, Moon was reported to be gravely ill and was put on a respirator at the intensive care unit of St. Mary's Hospital at The Catholic University of Korea in Seoul. He was admitted on August 14, 2012, after suffering from pneumonia earlier in the month. He died there on September 3.

Soon after Moon's death, the Global Peace Foundation, which had been founded in 2009 by Moon and Han's son Hyun Jin Moon and church leader Chung Hwan Kwak, distanced itself from the FFWPU, which is led by Han. In 2017 they also founded the Family Peace Association.

In 2014, Moon and Han's younger sons Hyung Jin Moon and Kook-jin Moon founded the Rod of Iron Ministries (also known as the World Peace and Unification Sanctuary Church). It has been controversial for its advocacy of private ownership of firearms and for its support of the January 6 United States Capitol protest.

The Unification Church has struggled with severe financial difficulties following the death of Sun Myung Moon. On September 23, 2025, church leader Han Hak-ja, Moon's widow, was arrested on bribery charges which involved the payment of two Chanel bags and a diamond necklace, together worth 80 million won ($57,900; £42,500), to former South Korean first lady Kim Keon Hee. Han was convicted and sentenced to two years' imprisonment in 2026.

== Beliefs ==
Moon's theological system, Divine Principle, was developed over a period of nine years. According to Moon, Jesus appeared to him on Easter Sunday 1935 on the mountainside and asked him to continue the work that he could not finish while he was on earth, due to the "tragedy" of his crucifixion. It was first published as Wolli Wonbon (원리 원본; 原理原本, 'Original Text of the Divine Principle') in 1945. The earliest manuscript was lost in North Korea during the Korean War. A second, expanded version, Wonli Hesol (원리 해설; 原理解說), or Explanation of the Divine Principle, was published in 1957. The Divine Principle or Exposition of the Divine Principle (원리강론; 原理講論; Wolli Gangnon) is the main theological textbook of the church. It was co-written by Sun Myung Moon and early disciple Hyo Won'eu and first published in 1966. A translation entitled Divine Principle was published in English in 1973. The Divine Principle lays out the core of Unification Church theology and is held by its believers to have the status of holy scripture.

Following the format of systematic theology, it includes God's purpose in creating human beings, the fall of man, and restoration – the process through history by which God is working to remove the ill effects of the fall and restore humanity back to the relationship and position that God originally intended. David Václavík and Dušan Lužný described the details of those three points as follows:

1. Principle of Creation: This first principle states that God created the world in his image. All of reality is then composed of bipolarities. The basic bipolarity is expressed by the terms sung-sang (성상; 性相, 'inner character' – the inner, invisible aspect of the created world) and hyung-sang (형상; 形相, 'outer form' – the outer, visible aspect of the created world). In addition to this, there is another bipolarity, denoted by the terms yin and yang. The first-mentioned bipolarity of sung-sang and hyung-sang reflects the relationship between soul (mind) and matter (body), while yin-yang reflects the relationship between femininity and masculinity. Hierarchy, described by the first principle (the basis of the four positions), then guarantees order in the world – God or a higher purpose is placed highest, in the middle are man and woman, and finally, children are placed as the result. As Václavík and Lužný further characterize the doctrine, "God is an absolute reality transcending time and space. The fundamental energy of God's being is also eternal. By the action of this energy, entities enter into a relationship with each other, the basis of which is the activity of giving and receiving. The goal is to achieve a balanced and harmonious relationship of giving and receiving, i.e., love." According to the teachings of the Church, the highest level of relationship is the relationship with God. By properly developing the relationship of giving and receiving, it should be possible to achieve union with God. The goal of creation is then the realization of the kingdom of heaven, which can be achieved by fulfilling the three biblical blessings. The principle describes three blessings as follows. The first blessing concerns the nature of man: God created man in his own image. The second blessing was to be fulfilled through Adam and Eve by establishing an ideal family that was pure and loving, but they failed to do so. The third blessing concerns man's position as a mediator between God and nature. Man is to master nature in order to perfect himself and nature itself and thus create the kingdom of heaven. Principle then describes three stages of growth for everything, including man: origin (formation), growth, and completion.
2. The Fall of Man: according to the teaching of the Church, there was no fulfillment of God's plan. God endowed man with free will and responsibility. Like everything in the universe, Adam and Eve went through three phases of development (origin, growth, and completion). This part describes that, before completion could occur, the orientation of the give-and-take relationship was reversed when Eve established a sexual relationship with Satan. Thus occurred the fall of man and the creation of a world "with Satan at the center, and all men have become children of Satan." According to this belief, the world has been dominated by Satan's lineage through the human race, and men with evil natures transmit evil. Through their children, they create evil families and, thus, an evil world.
3. The principle of restoration: According to the teaching of the Church, the primary purpose of creation was to build the Kingdom of Heaven on earth. This means that God will eventually save this sinful world and restore it to its original, sinless state. This is the basis of the principle of restoration. This is the perspective through which the Unification Church views the entire history of humanity. For the church, history is the history of restoration and of God's efforts to save fallen men. At the end of this history, the Last Days are to come. Restoration teaches that God has tried to end the sinful world and restore the original good world several times in human history. However, men have failed in their responsibility and thwarted God's will. Doctrine claims that God made several such attempts: in the case of Noah, God first destroyed the sinful world with a flood, yet Noah's second-born son, Ham, sinned again. Another attempt to restore the original sinless world was the coming of Jesus, when God sent the Messiah to establish the perfect family and thus create the Kingdom of Heaven on earth. Jesus did not fulfill this mission because he was crucified. Václavík and Lužný summarize: "According to the doctrine of the Unification Church, we are currently living in the period of the Last Days, that is, the period of the Second Coming of Christ. However, today's situation is very different from previous ones. For Christ will be successful at His Second Coming – God will send the 'True Parents of humanity' and through them fulfill the purpose of creation. During the previous two thousand years, God has prepared, according to the principle of restoration, a suitable democratic, social, and legal environment that will protect Christ at the Second Coming."

Followers take as a starting point the truth of the Christian Old and New Testaments, with the Divine Principle as an additional text intended to interpret and "fulfill" the purpose of those older texts. Moon was intent on replacing worldwide forms of Christianity with his new unified vision of it, Moon being a self-declared messiah. Moon's followers regard him as a separate person from Jesus but with a mission to basically continue and complete Jesus's work in a new way, according to the Principle. The Unification Church regards a person's destination after death as dependent on how much one's work during this life corresponds to its teachings. Moon's followers believe in Apocatastasis, that everyone will eventually receive salvation.

In 1977, Frederick Sontag analyzed the teachings of the Divine Principle and summarized it in 12 concise points:

1. God: Divine Principle teaches, that there is one living, eternal, and true God, a person beyond space and time, who has a perfect reason, emotion, and will, whose deepest heart essence is love, which includes both masculinity and femininity, a person who is the source of all truth, beauty, and goodness, and who is the creator and sustainer of man, the universe and all things visible and invisible. Man and the universe reflect his personality, character, and purpose.
2. Man: Man was then created by God as a unique creature, made in his image as his children, like him in personality and character, and created with the capacity to respond to his love, to be a source of his joy, and to share his creativity.
3. God's desire for man and creation: To the relationship between God and Man, teaching states that God's desire for man and creation is eternal and unchanging, God wants men and women to fulfill three things: First, each should grow to perfection so as to become one with God in heart, will, and action, so that their mind and body are united in perfect harmony centered on God's love; second, to be united with God as husband and wife and give birth to God's sinless children, thereby establishing a sinless family and ultimately a sinless world; third, to become masters of the created world, establishing loving dominion with him in a mutual relationship of giving and receiving. None of this happened because of human sin. Therefore, God's present desire is to solve the sin problem and restore all these things, thereby bringing about the earthly and heavenly kingdom of God.
4. Sin: The Divine Principle describes the origin of sin and the process of the fall of man. The first man and woman (Adam and Eve), before they became perfect, were tempted by the archangel Lucifer to illicit love. Because of this, Adam and Eve willfully turned away from God's will and purpose, bringing spiritual death to themselves and the human race. As a result of this Fall, Satan usurped the position of the true father of humankind, so that all humans since then have been born in sin both physically and spiritually and have sinful tendencies. Therefore, human beings tend to resist God and his will and live in ignorance as to their true nature and parentage and all that they have lost thereby. Thus God suffers for lost children and a lost world, and has had to struggle to restore them to himself constantly. Creation groans to give birth while waiting to be reunited with the true children of God.
5. Christology: According to the Divine Principle, fallen humanity can only be restored to God through Christ (the Messiah), who comes as the new Adam to become the new head of the human race through whom humanity can be reborn into the family of God. For God to send the Messiah, humankind must fulfill certain conditions that restore what was lost because of the Fall.
6. History: The Divine Principle describes that restoration is accomplished through the payment of the indemnity for a sin. Human history is then a record of God's and man's efforts to make this indemnity over time, so that the conditions can be met and God can send the Messiah, who begins the final process of restoration. If some efforts fail in fulfilling the conditions of indemnity, they must be repeated, usually by another person after a period of time. According to the Divine Principle, this is why history shows cyclical patterns. History culminates with the coming of the Messiah, which ends the old age and begins a new age.
7. Resurrection: The Divine Principle explains resurrection as the process of restoration to spiritual life and spiritual maturity, ultimately uniting a person with God. It is the transition from spiritual death to spiritual life. This should be accomplished in part by human effort (through prayer, good works, etc.) with the help of the saints in the spirit world and completed by God's effort to bring man to new birth through Christ (the Messiah).
8. Predestination: According to the Divine Principle, God has predestined absolutely that all men will be restored to him and has chosen all men for salvation, but he has also given man a portion of responsibility (to be fulfilled by man's free will) for the fulfillment of his original will and his will to bring about restoration. This responsibility remains permanently with man. God has predestined and called certain persons and groups of people to certain responsibilities. If these fail, others must step in and receive greater compensation.
9. Jesus: The Divine Principle teaches that Jesus of Nazareth came as the Christ, the second Adam, the only begotten Son of God. He became one with God, spoke God's words, and did God's works, thus showing God to men. However, people eventually rejected and crucified him, preventing him from building God's kingdom on earth. The Divine Principle teaches that Jesus overcame Satan in the crucifixion and resurrection, making spiritual salvation possible for those who are born again through him and the Holy Spirit. The restoration of the Kingdom of God on earth awaits the Second Coming of Christ.
10. The Bible: The Divine Principle explains the Scriptures of the Old and New Testaments. Both should be the record of God's progressive revelation to humankind. The purpose of the Bible, according to the Divine Principle, is to bring humanity to Christ and reveal to humankind the heart of God. The Divine Principle supports the Bible, as the truth is unique, eternal, and unchanging; therefore, any new messages from God will be consistent with the Bible and contain deeper explanations. The Divine Principle describes the current time as the last days, when God must communicate the new truth (in the book 'God's Principle') so that humankind can finish what is still unfinished.
11. The ultimate renewal: According to the Divine Principle, a proper understanding of theology focuses simultaneously on man's relationship with God (vertical) and man's relationship with his neighbor (horizontal). Man's sin has disrupted both of these relationships and thus caused all the problems in the world. These problems will be solved through the restoration of man to God through Christ, as well as through such measures as establishing appropriate moral standards and practices, forming true families uniting all peoples and races (Oriental, Western, and African), resolving the tension between science and religion, correcting economic, racial, political, and educational injustices, and overcoming God-denying ideologies such as Communism.
12. The Second Coming (Eschatology): The Divine Principle teaches that Christ's Second Coming will occur in this age, which would be similar to the time of his First Coming. Christ should come as before, that is, as a man in the flesh. By marrying his bride in the flesh, he will establish a family and thus become the True Parents of all humankind. Through accepting the 'True Parents' (참부모) (the Second Coming of Christ), obeying them, and following them, the original sin of humankind would be removed, and people can eventually become perfect. In this way, true families fulfilling God's ideal will begin, and the Kingdom of God's will should be established both on earth and in heaven. According to the Divine Principle, this day is now at hand in the person of Sun Myung Moon.

== Traditions ==
=== Blessing ceremony ===
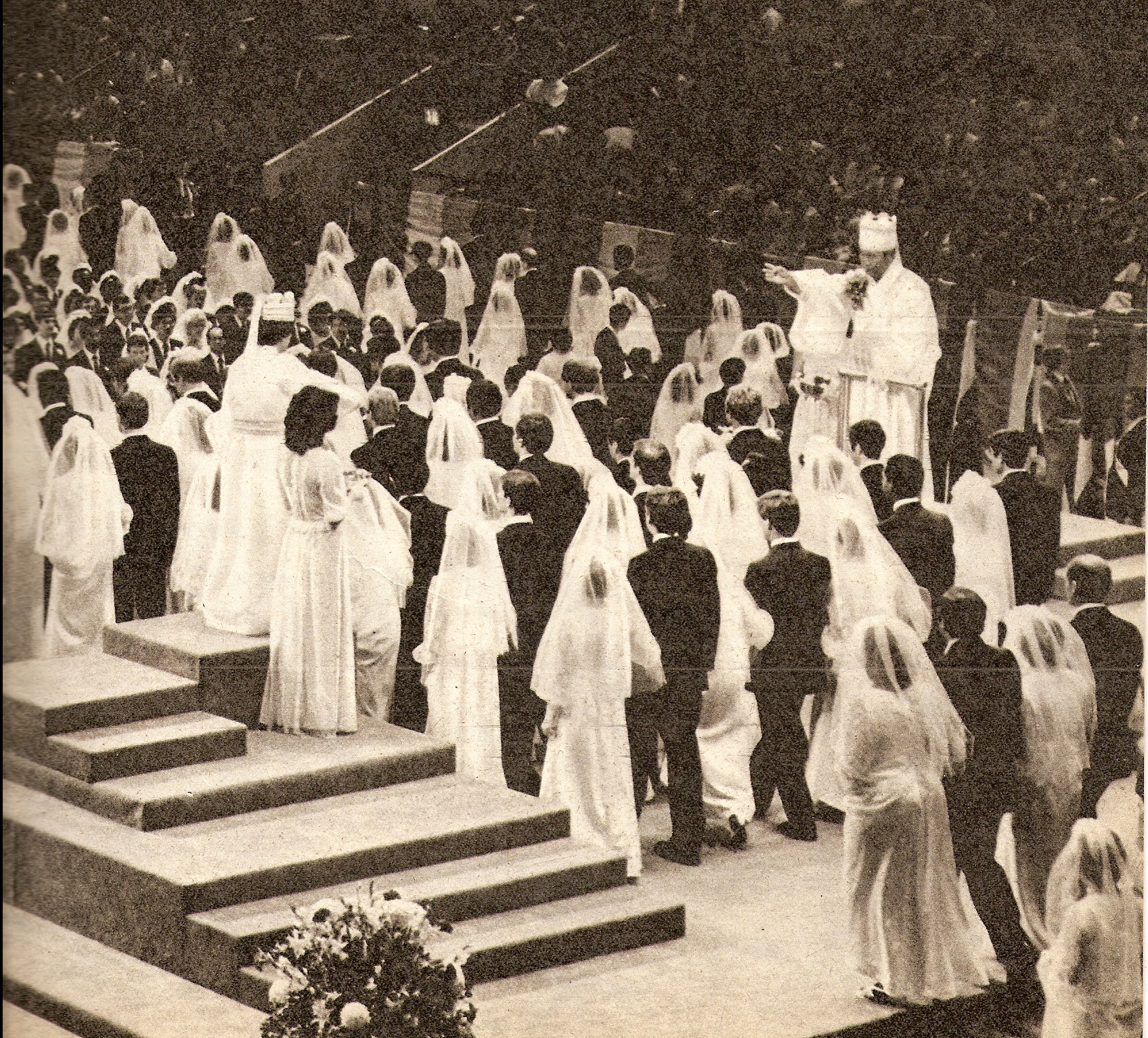
The first Blessing ceremony outside of Korea was a mass wedding in Madison Square Garden, New York City, on July 1, 1982.

The Unification Church is well known for its Blessing tradition: a mass wedding ceremony (합동결혼식) and wedding vow renewal ceremony. It is given to engaged or married couples. According to the Church's belief in a serpent seed interpretation of original sin and the Fall of Man, Eve was sexually seduced by Satan (the serpent) and thus the human bloodline is sinful due to being directly descended from Satan. Through the Blessing, members believe, the couple is removed from the lineage of sinful humanity and restored back into God's sinless lineage.

The first Blessing ceremony was held in 1961 for 36 couples in Seoul, South Korea by the Moons shortly after their own marriage in 1960. All the couples were members of the church. Moon matched all of the couples except 12 who were already married to each other before joining the church. This was Moon's second marriage. In 1945 he married Sun Kil Choi. They had a son in 1946 and divorced in 1954.

Later Blessing ceremonies were larger in scale but followed the same pattern. All participants were HSA-UWC members and Moon matched most of the couples. In 1982 the first large-scale Blessing (of 2,000 couples) outside of Korea took place in Madison Square Garden, New York City. In 1988, Moon matched 2,500 Korean members with Japanese members for a Blessing ceremony held in Korea, partly in order to promote unity between the two nations.

Moon's practice of matching couples was very unusual in both Christian tradition and modern Western culture and attracted much attention and controversy. The Blessing ceremonies have attracted a lot of attention in the press and in the public imagination, often being labeled "mass weddings." However, in most cases, the Blessing ceremony is not a legal wedding ceremony. Some couples are already married and those that are engaged are later legally married according to the laws of their own countries. The New York Times referred to a 1997 ceremony for 28,000 couples as a "marriage affirmation ceremony," adding: "The real weddings were held later in separate legal ceremonies."

Mary Farrell Bednarowski says that marriage is "really the only sacrament" in the Unification movement. Unificationists therefore view singleness as "not a state to be sought or cultivated" but as preparation for marriage. Pre-marital celibacy and marital faithfulness are emphasized. Adherents may be taught to "abstain from intimate relations for a specified time after marriage." The church does not give its marriage blessing to same-sex couples. Moon has emphasized the similarity between Unification views of sexuality and evangelical Christianity, "reaching out to conservative Christians in this country in the last few years by emphasizing shared goals like support for sexual abstinence outside of marriage, and opposition to homosexuality." Since 2001 couples Blessed by Moon have been able to arrange marriages for their own children, without his direct guidance. Also, some Unification Church members are married to non-members.

=== Holy days ===
Holy Days of the Unification Church:

- True God's Day (하나님의 날, established January 1, 1968) – always January 1 until 2009, then according to the lunar calendar – January 23, 2012
- True Parents' Birthday (참부모성탄 or 기원절, January 6, 1920 – January 6, 1943) – Anniversary of the Coronation Ceremony for the Kingship of God (2001), January 6, until 2009, then according to the lunar calendar – January 28, 2012
- True Parents' Day (참부모의 날, established March 1, 1960, according to the lunar calendar) – January 28, 2012
- Day of All True Things (참만물의날, established May 1, 1963, according to the lunar calendar) – June 20, 2012
- Chil Il Jeol (칠일절) – Declaration Day of God's Eternal Blessing(하나님 축복영원 선포일, Founded July 1, 1991) – always July 1 until 2009, then according to the lunar calendar – August 18, 2012
- Chil Pal Cheol (칠팔절) or Declaration of the Realm of the Cosmic Sabbath for the Parents of Heaven and Earth (천지부모 천주안식권 선포일) – founded July 7, 1997, according to the lunar calendar – August 24, 2012
- True Children's Day (참자녀의 날, established on October 1, 1960, according to the lunar calendar) – November 14, 2012
- Foundation Day for the Nation of Heaven and Earth (천주통일국 개천일, founded October 3, 1988) – always October 3 until 2009, then November 16, 2012, according to the lunar calendar

== Scholarly studies ==
In the early 1960s, John Lofland lived with HSA-UWC missionary Young Oon Kim and a small group of American members and studied their promotional and proselytization activities. Lofland noted that most of their efforts were ineffective and that most of the people who joined did so because of personal relationships with other members—often family relationships. Lofland published his findings in 1964 as a doctoral thesis entitled "The World Savers: A Field Study of Cult Processes" and in a 1966 book by Prentice-Hall, Doomsday Cult: A Study of Conversion, Proselytization, and Maintenance of Faith.

In 1977, Frederick Sontag, a professor of philosophy at Pomona College and a minister in the United Church of Christ, spent 10 months visiting HSA-UWC members in North America, Europe and Asia, as well as interviewing Moon at his home in New York State. He reported his findings and observations in Sun Myung Moon and the Unification Church, published by Abingdon Press. The book also provides an overview of the Divine Principle. In an interview with UPI, Sontag compared the HSA-UWC with the Church of Jesus Christ of Latter-day Saints and said that he expects its practices to conform more to mainstream American society as its members become more mature. He added that he did not want to be considered an apologist but that a close look at HSA-UWC's theology is important: "They raise some incredibly interesting issues."

In 1984, Eileen Barker published The Making of a Moonie based on her seven-year study of HSA-UWC members in the United Kingdom and the United States. In 2006, Laurence Iannaccone of George Mason University, a specialist in the economics of religion, wrote that The Making of a Moonie was "one of the most comprehensive and influential studies" of the process of conversion to new religious movements. Australian psychologist Len Oakes and British psychiatry professor Anthony Storr, who have written rather critically about cults, gurus, new religious movements, and their leaders have praised The Making of a Moonie. It was given the Distinguished Book Award in 1985 by the Society for the Scientific Study of Religion. In 1997 Barker reported that Unificationists had mostly undergone a transformation in their worldview from millennialism to utopianism. In 1998, Irving Louis Horowitz, a sociologist, questioned the relationship between the HSA-UWC and scholars whom it paid to conduct research on its behalf.

== Relations with other religions ==
=== Judaism ===
Unificationism holds that God prepared the Jewish people as a whole to receive the Messiah in the person of Jesus of Nazareth, with John the Baptist tasked from birth with the mission to lead the Jewish people to Jesus, but failed in his mission. According to the Divine Principle, the Jews went through a "course of indemnity" due to the failure of John the Baptist to recognize Jesus as the Messiah, in spite of publicly testifying to him at the Jordan River, whilst receiving the baptism.

In 1976, the American Jewish Committee (AJC) released a report by Rabbi A. James Rudin that stated that the Divine Principle contained "pejorative language, stereotyped imagery, and accusations of collective sin and guilt". In a news conference that was presented by the AJC and representatives of Catholic and Protestant churches, panelists stated that the text "contained over 125 anti-Jewish references". They also cited Moon's recent and public condemnation of "antisemitic and anti-Christian attitudes," and called upon him to make a "comprehensive and systematic removal" of antisemitic and anti-Christian references in the Divine Principle as a demonstration of good faith.

In 1977, the HSA-UWC issued a rebuttal to the report, stating that it was neither comprehensive nor reconciliatory; instead, it had a "hateful tone," and it was filled with "sweeping denunciations". It denied that the Divine Principle teaches antisemitism and gave detailed responses to 17 specific allegations which were contained in the AJC's report, stating that the allegations were distortions of teachings and obscurations of the real content of passages or the passages were accurate summaries of Jewish scriptures or New Testament passages.

In 1984, Mose Durst, then the president of the Unification Church of the United States as well as a convert from Judaism, said that the Jewish community had been "hateful" in its response to the growth of the Unification movement and he also placed blame on the community's "insecurity" and Unification Church members' "youthful zeal and ignorance". Rudin, then the national interreligious affairs director of the American Jewish Committee, said that Durst's remarks were inaccurate and unfair and he also said that "hateful is a harsh word to use." In the same year, Durst wrote in his autobiography: "Our relations with the Jewish community have been the most painful to me personally. I say this with a heavy heart since I was raised in the Jewish faith and am proud of my heritage."

In 1989, Unification Church leaders Peter Ross and Andrew Wilson issued "Guidelines for Members of The Unification Church in Relations with the Jewish People", which stated: "In the past there have been serious misunderstandings between Judaism and the Unification Church. In order to clarify these difficulties and guide Unification Church members in their relations with Jews, the Unification Church suggests the following guidelines." In 2008, the Encyclopaedia Judaica described the statements and guidelines arising from mutual contacts as "excellent".

=== Christianity ===
Protestant commentators have criticized Unification Church teachings as being contrary to the Protestant doctrine of salvation by faith alone. In their influential book The Kingdom of the Cults (first published in 1965), Walter Ralston Martin and Ravi K. Zacharias disagreed with the Divine Principle on the issues of Christology, the virgin birth of Jesus, the movement's belief that Jesus should have married, the necessity of the crucifixion of Jesus, and a literal resurrection of Jesus, as well as a literal Second Coming.

In 1974, Moon founded the Unification Theological Seminary in Barrytown, New York, in part to improve relations between the movement and other churches. Professors from other denominations, including a Methodist minister, a Presbyterian, and a Roman Catholic priest, as well as a rabbi, were hired to teach religious studies to the students, who were being trained as leaders in the movement. In 1977, Unification member Jonathan Wells, who later became well known as the author of the popular Intelligent Design book Icons of Evolution, defended Unification theology against what he said were unfair criticisms by the National Council of Churches. That same year Frederick Sontag, a professor of philosophy at Pomona College and a minister in the United Church of Christ, published Sun Myung Moon and the Unification Church which gave an overview of the movement and urged Christians to take it more seriously.

In the 1980s, the Unification Church sent thousands of American ministers from other churches on trips to Japan and South Korea to inform them about Unification teachings. At least one minister was dismissed by his congregation for taking part. In 1994 the church had about 5,000 members in Russia and came under criticism from the Russian Orthodox Church. In 1997, the Russian government passed a law requiring the movement and other non-Russian religions to register their congregations and submit to tight controls.

In 1982, Moon was imprisoned in the United States after a jury found him guilty of willfully filing false federal income tax returns and conspiracy. (See: United States v. Sun Myung Moon). HSA-UWC members launched a public relations campaign. Booklets, letters and videotapes were mailed to approximately 300,000 Christian leaders in the United States. Many of them signed petitions protesting the government's case. The American Baptist Churches in the U.S.A., the National Council of Churches, the National Black Catholic Clergy Caucus and the Southern Christian Leadership Conference filed briefs in support of Moon. In 1995, the Unification Movement's related organization the Women's Federation for World Peace indirectly contributed $3.5 million to help Baptist Liberty University which at that time was in financial difficulty. This was reported in the United States news media as an example of closer relationships between the movement and conservative Christian congregations.

=== Islam ===
The Divine Principle lists the Muslim world as one of the world's four major divisions (the others being East Asia, Hindu and Christendom). Unification movement support for Islamist anti-communists came to public attention in 1987 when church member Lee Shapiro was killed in Afghanistan during the Soviet–Afghan War while filming a documentary. The resistance group they were traveling with reported that they had been ambushed by military forces of the Soviet Union or the Afghan government. However, the details have been questioned, partly because of the poor reputation of the group's leader, Gulbuddin Hekmatyar.

The Muslim advocacy group Council on American–Islamic Relations listed The Washington Times among media outlets it said "regularly demonstrates or supports Islamophobic themes." In 1998, the Egyptian newspaper Al-Ahram wrote that its editorial policy was "rabidly anti-Arab, anti-Muslim and pro-Israel." In 1997, the Washington Report on Middle East Affairs (which is critical of United States and Israeli policies), praised The Washington Times and the Times' sister publication The Middle East Times (along with The Christian Science Monitor owned by the Church of Christ, Scientist) for their objective and informative coverage of Islam and the Middle East, while criticizing the Times generally pro-Israel editorial policy. The Report suggested that these newspapers, being owned by religious organizations, were less influenced by pro-Israel pressure groups in the United States.

In 2000 the FFWPU co-sponsored the Million Family March, a rally in Washington, D.C., to celebrate family unity and racial and religious harmony, along with the Nation of Islam. Louis Farrakhan, the leader of the Nation of Islam, was the main speaker at the event which was held on October 16, 2000; the fifth anniversary of the Million Man March, which was also organized by Farrakhan. Unification Church leader Dan Fefferman wrote to his colleagues acknowledging that Farrakhan's and Moon's views differed on multiple issues but shared a view of a "God-centered family." In 2007, the Moons sent greetings to Farrakhan while he was recovering from cancer, saying: "We send love and greetings to Minister Farrakhan and Mother Khadijah."

In the 1990s and 2000s, the Unification Movement made public statements claiming communications with the spirits of religious leaders including Muhammad and also Confucius, the Buddha, Jesus and Augustine, as well as political leaders such as Karl Marx, Friedrich Engels, Lenin, Joseph Stalin, Leon Trotsky, Mao Zedong and many more. This was reported to have distanced the movement from Islam as well as from mainstream Christianity.

From 2001 to 2009 the Unification movement owned the American Life TV Network (now known as Youtoo TV), which in 2007 broadcast George Clooney's documentary A Journey to Darfur, which was harshly critical of Islamists in Darfur, the Republic of Sudan. It released the film on DVD in 2008 and announced that proceeds from its sale would be donated to the International Rescue Committee. In his 2009 autobiography, Moon praised Islam and expressed the hope that there would be more understanding between different religious communities. In 2011, representatives of the Unification Church took part in an international seminar which was held in Taiwan by the Muslim World League. The stated purpose of the seminar was to encourage interfaith dialogue and discourage people from resorting to terrorism.

=== Interfaith activities ===
In 2009, the FFWPU held an interfaith event in the Congress of the Republic of Peru. Notable Peruvian politicians, including former president of the Congress Marcial Ayaipoma, were called "Ambassadors for Peace" of the Unification Church. In 2010, the church built a large interfaith temple in Seoul. Author Deepak Chopra was the keynote speaker at an interfaith event of the Unification Church co-hosted with the United Nations at the headquarters of the United Nations. In 2011, an interfaith event was held at the National Assembly of Thailand, the President of the National Assembly of Thailand attended the event. In 2012, the Unification movement affiliated-Universal Peace Federation held an interfaith dialogue in Italy that was co-sponsored by the United Nations. That year, the Universal Peace Federation held an interfaith program for representatives of 12 various religions and confessions in the hall of the United Nations General Assembly. The President of the United Nations General Assembly, the Deputy Secretary-General of the United Nations, the Permanent Observer of the Holy See to the United Nations, and other UN officials spoke.

== Science ==
The Divine Principle calls for the unification of science and religion: "Religion and science, each in their own spheres, have been the methods of searching for truth in order to conquer ignorance and attain knowledge. Eventually, the way of religion and the way of science should be integrated and their problems resolved in one united undertaking; the two aspects of truth, internal and external, should develop in full consonance."

In the 1970s and 1980s, the Unification Movement sponsored the International Conference on the Unity of the Sciences (ICUS), in order to promote the concept of the unity of science and religion. American news media have suggested that the conferences were also an attempt to improve the often controversial public image of the church.

The first conference, held in 1972, had 20 participants; while the largest conference, in Seoul, South Korea in 1982, had 808 participants from over 100 countries. Participants in one or more of the conferences included Nobel laureates John Eccles (Physiology or Medicine 1963, who chaired the 1976 conference), as well as Eugene Wigner (Physics 1963).

The relationship between the Unification Movement and science again came to public attention in 2002 with the publication of Icons of Evolution, a popular book critical of the teaching of evolution written by member Jonathan Wells. Wells is a graduate of the Unification Theological Seminary and has been active with the Discovery Institute as an advocate for intelligent design.

== Political activism ==
=== Anti-communism ===
In the 1940s, Moon cooperated with Communist Party members in support of the Korean independence movement against Imperial Japan. After the Korean War (1950–1953), he became an outspoken anti-communist. Moon viewed the Cold War between liberal democracy and communism as the final conflict between God and Satan, with divided Korea as its primary front line. Soon after its founding, the Unification movement began supporting anti-communist organizations, including the World League for Freedom and Democracy founded in 1966 in Taipei, Republic of China (Taiwan), by Chiang Kai-shek, and the Korean Culture and Freedom Foundation, an international public diplomacy organization which also sponsored Radio Free Asia. The Unification movement was criticized for its anti-communist activism by the mainstream media and the alternative press, many of whose members said that it could lead to World War III and a nuclear holocaust. The movement's anti-communist activities received financial support from Japanese millionaire and activist Ryōichi Sasakawa.

In 1972, Moon predicted the decline of communism, based on the teachings of the Divine Principle: "After 7,000 biblical years – 6,000 years of restoration history plus the millennium, the time of completion – communism will fall in its 70th year. Here is the meaning of the year 1978. Communism, begun in 1917, could maintain itself for approximately 60 years and reach its peak. So 1978 is the borderline and afterward, communism will decline; in the 70th year, it will be altogether ruined. This is true. Therefore, now is the time for people who are studying communism to abandon it."

In 1973, Moon called for an "automatic theocracy" to replace communism and solve "every political and economic situation in every field." In 1975, Moon spoke at a government-sponsored rally against potential North Korean military aggression on the island Yeouido in Seoul to an audience of around 1 million.

In 1976, Moon established News World Communications, an international news media conglomerate that publishes The Washington Times newspaper in Washington, D.C., and newspapers in South Korea, Japan and South America, partly in order to promote political conservatism. According to The Washington Post, "the Times was established by Moon to combat communism and be a conservative alternative to what he perceived as the liberal bias of The Washington Post." Bo Hi Pak, called Moon's "right-hand man," was the founding president and the founding chairman of the board. Moon asked Richard L. Rubenstein, a rabbi and college professor, to join its board of directors. The Washington Times has often been noted for its generally pro-Israel editorial policies. In 2002, during the 20th anniversary party for the Times, Moon said: "The Washington Times will become the instrument in spreading the truth about God to the world."

In 1980, members founded CAUSA International, an anti-communist educational organization based in New York City. In the 1980s, it was active in 21 countries. In the United States, it sponsored educational conferences for evangelical and fundamentalist Christian leaders as well as seminars and conferences for Senate staffers, Hispanic Americans and conservative activists. In 1986, CAUSA International sponsored the documentary film Nicaragua Was Our Home, about the Miskito Indians of Nicaragua and their persecution at the hands of the Nicaraguan government. It was filmed and produced by USA-UWC member Lee Shapiro, who later died while filming with anti-Soviet forces during the Soviet–Afghan War. At this time CAUSA International also directly assisted the United States Central Intelligence Agency in supplying the Contras, in addition to paying for flights by rebel leaders. CAUSA's aid to the Contras escalated after Congress cut off CIA funding for them. According to contemporary CIA reports, supplies for the anti-Sandinista forces and their families came from a variety of sources in the US ranging from Moon's Unification Church to U.S. politicians, evangelical groups and former military officers.

In 1980, members in Washington, D.C., disrupted a protest rally against the United States military draft. In 1981, the Appellate Division of New York State Supreme Court ruled that the HSA–UWC was not entitled to property tax exemptions on its New York City properties since its primary purpose was political, not religious. In 1982, the New York Court of Appeals (the state's highest court) overturned that ruling and held instead that HSA-UWC should be considered a religious organization for tax purposes. In 1983, some American members joined a public protest against the Soviet Union in response to its shooting down of Korean Airlines Flight 007. In 1984, the HSA–UWC founded the Washington Institute for Values in Public Policy, a Washington, D.C. think tank that underwrites conservative-oriented research and seminars at Stanford University, the University of Chicago and other institutions. In the same year, member Dan Fefferman founded the International Coalition for Religious Freedom (ICRF Japanese name: 国際宗教自由連合) in Virginia, which is active in protesting what it considers to be threats to religious freedom by governmental agencies. In August 1985, the Professors World Peace Academy, an organization founded by Moon, sponsored a conference in Geneva to debate the theme "The situation in the world after the fall of the communist empire." After the dissolution of the Soviet Union in 1991 the Unification movement promoted extensive missionary work in Russia and other former Soviet nations.

=== Korean unification ===
In 1991, Moon met with Kim Il Sung, the North Korean president, to discuss ways to achieve peace on the Korean Peninsula, as well as on international relations, tourism and other topics. In 1992, Kim gave his first and only interview with the Western news media to Washington Times reporter Josette Sheeran, who later became executive director of the United Nations World Food Programme. In 1994, Moon was officially invited to Kim's funeral, in spite of the absence of diplomatic relations between North Korea and South Korea.

In 1998, Unification movement-related businesses launched operations in North Korea with the approval of the government of South Korea, which had prohibited business relationships between North and South before. In 2000, the church-associated business group Tongil Group founded Pyeonghwa Motors in the North Korean port of Nampo, in cooperation with the North Korean government. During the presidency of George W. Bush, Dong Moon Joo, a Unification movement member and then president of The Washington Times, undertook unofficial diplomatic missions to North Korea in an effort to improve its relationship with the United States. Joo was born in North Korea and is a citizen of the United States.

In 2003, Korean Unification Movement members started a political party in South Korea. It was named The Party for God, Peace, Unification and Home. In its inauguration declaration, the new party said it would focus on preparing for Korean reunification by educating the public about God and peace. Moon was a member of the Honorary Committee of the Unification Ministry of the Republic of Korea. Church member Jae-jung Lee was a Unification Minister of South Korea.

In 2010, in Pyongyang, to mark the 20th anniversary of Moon's visit to Kim Il Sung, de jure head of state Kim Yong-nam hosted Moon's son Hyung Jin Moon, then the president of the Unification Church, in his official residence. At that time, Hyung Jin Moon donated 600 tons of flour to the children of Jeongju, the birthplace of Sun Myung Moon. In 2012, Moon was posthumously awarded North Korea's National Reunification Prize. On the first anniversary of Moon's death, North Korean chairman Kim Jong Un expressed condolences to Han and the family, saying: "Kim Jong Un prayed for the repose of Moon, who worked hard for national concord, prosperity and reunification and world peace." In 2017, the Unification Church sponsored the International Association of Parliamentarians for Peace (IAPP) – headed by former prime minister of Nepal Madhav Kumar Nepal and former minister of peace and reconstruction Ek Nath Dhakal – visited Pyongyang and had constructive talks with the Korean Workers' Party. In 2020 the movement held an in-person and virtual rally for Korean unification which drew about one million attendees.

=== Other political positions ===
Moon was a member of the Honorary Committee of the Unification Ministry of the Republic of Korea. The church member Jae-jung Lee had been once a unification minister of South Korea. Another, Ek Nath Dhakal, was a member of the 1st and 2nd Nepalese Constituent Assemblies, and the first Minister for Co-operatives and Poverty Alleviation Ministry of the Government of Nepal. In 2016, a study sponsored by the Unification Theological Seminary found that American members were divided in their choices in the 2016 United States presidential election, with the largest bloc supporting Senator Bernie Sanders.

Hak Ja Han has been acting as a leader and public spokesperson for the movement. In 2019, she spoke at a rally in Japan and called for greater understanding and cooperation between the Pacific Rim nations. In 2020, she spoke at a UPF-sponsored in-person and virtual rally for Korean unification, which drew about one million attendees. In 2020 former Secretary General of the United Nations Ban Ki-moon received the Sunhak Peace Prize, which is sponsored by the Unification Church and an award of $1,000,000. In 2021, Donald Trump and Shinzo Abe gave speeches at the Rally of Hope event hosted by an affiliate of the Unification Church. As of August 2022, five ministers of the Cabinet of Japan had relationships with the Unification Church, including the Minister of Health, Labour, and Welfare and the head of the Ministry of Internal Affairs and Communications.

== Criticism and controversies ==
=== Criticisms of Moon ===
Moon's claim to be the Messiah and the Second Coming of Jesus has been rejected by both Jewish and Christian scholars. Protestant commentators have criticized Moon's teachings as being contrary to the Protestant doctrine of sola fide (lit. 'faith alone'). In their influential book The Kingdom of the Cults (first published in 1965), Walter Ralston Martin and Ravi K. Zacharias disagreed with the Divine Principle on the issues of the divinity of Jesus, the virgin birth of Jesus, Moon's belief that Jesus should have married, the necessity of the crucifixion of Jesus, a literal resurrection of Jesus, as well as a literal second coming of Jesus.

Commentators have criticized the Divine Principle for saying that the First World War, the Second World War, the Holocaust, and the Cold War served as indemnity conditions to prepare the world for the establishment of the Kingdom of God. In 1998, journalist Peter Maass, writing for The New Yorker, reported that some Unification members complained about Blessing being given to non-members who had not gone through the same course that members had. In 2000, Moon was criticized, including by some members of his church, for his support of Nation of Islam leader Louis Farrakhan's Million Family March.

Moon was criticized for his relationship with Jewish scholar Richard L. Rubenstein, an advocate of the "death of God theology" of the 1960s. Rubenstein was a defender of the Unification Church and served on its advisory council, as well as on the board of directors of the church-owned Washington Times newspaper. In the 1990s, he served as president of the University of Bridgeport, which was then affiliated with the church.

In 1998, the Egyptian newspaper Al-Ahram criticized Moon's possible relationship with Israeli Prime Minister Benjamin Netanyahu and wrote that the Washington Times editorial policy was "rabidly anti-Arab, anti-Muslim and pro-Israel."

Moon has been accused of advocating a worldwide "automatic theocracy", albeit based on a poorly translated speech.

=== Theological disputes with Christianity ===
==== Fall of Man and view of Jesus ====
Central to Unification teachings is the concept that the Fall of Man was caused by the literal mating of Eve and Satan in the Garden of Eden, which contaminated the whole human race with sin. According to the religion, humanity can only be restored to God through a messiah who comes as a new Adam: a new head of the human race, replacing the sinful parents and siring new children free from Satanic influence. In the Unification Church, Jesus is this messiah, just as he is a messianic figure in more mainstream Christianity. However, since Jesus was prematurely killed before he could start a new sinless family, Moon claims he himself was called upon by God to fulfill Jesus's unresolved mission. In 1980, Unification theologian Young Oon Kim wrote:

Unification theology teaches that Jesus came to establish the kingdom of Heaven on Earth. As St. Paul wrote, Jesus was to be the new Adam restoring the lost garden of Eden. For this purpose he chose twelve apostles, symbolizing the original twelve tribes of Israel, and sent out seventy disciples, symbolizing all the nations of the world. Like John the Baptist, Jesus proclaimed that the long-awaited kingdom of heaven was at hand (Matt. 4:17). Jesus was appointed God's earthly representative in order to subjugate Satan, cleanse men of original sin, and free them from the power of evil. Christ's mission involved liberation from sin and raising mankind to the perfection stage. His purpose was to bring about the kingdom of heaven in our world with the help of men filled with divine truth and love. Jesus' goal was to restore the Garden of Eden, a place of joy and beauty in which true families of perfected parents would dwell with God in a full relationship of reciprocal love.

The Unification view of Jesus has been criticized by mainstream Christian authors and theologians. In their influential book The Kingdom of the Cults (first published in 1965), Walter Ralston Martin and Ravi K. Zacharias disagreed with the Divine Principle on the issues of the divinity of Jesus, the virgin birth of Jesus, the Unification Church's belief that Jesus should have married, a literal resurrection of Jesus, as well as a literal Second Coming. They add: "Moon makes all men equal in 'divinity' to Jesus, thereby striking a blow at the uniqueness of Christ." The Divine Principle states on this point:

There is no greater value than that of a person who has realized the ideal of creation. This is the value of Jesus, who surely attained the highest imaginable value. The conventional Christian belief in Jesus' divinity is well founded because, as a perfect human being, Jesus is totally one with God. To assert that Jesus is none other than a man who has completed the purpose of creation does not degrade the value of Jesus in the least.

Unificationist theologian Young Oon Kim wrote, and some members of the Unification movement believe, that Zechariah was the father of Jesus, based on the work of Leslie Weatherhead, an English Christian theologian in the liberal Protestant tradition.

==== Indemnity ====
Indemnity, in the context of Unification theology, is a part of the process by which human beings and the world are restored to God's ideal. The concept of indemnity is explained at the start of the second half of the Divine Principle, "Introduction to Restoration":

What, then, is the meaning of restoration through indemnity? When someone has lost his original position or state, he must make some condition to be restored to it. The making of such conditions of restitution is called indemnity... God's work to restore people to their true, unfallen state by having them fulfill indemnity conditions is called the providence of restoration through indemnity. (Note: 그 러면 '탕감복귀'란 무엇을 말하는 것인가? 무엇이든지 그 본연의 위치와 상태 등을 잃어버리게 되었을 때, 그것들을 본래의 위치와 상태에로 복귀하려면 반드시 거기에 필요한 어떠한 조건을 세워야 한다. 이러한 조건을 세우는 것을 탕감 (tanggam) 이라고 하는 것이다....그리고 이처럼 탕감조건을 세워서 창조본연의 인간으로 복귀해 나아가는 섭리를 탕감복귀섭리라고 말한다)

The Divine Principle goes on to explain three types of indemnity conditions. Equal conditions of indemnity pay back the full value of what was lost. The Hebrew Bible verse "life for life, eye for eye, tooth for tooth" (Exodus 21:23–24) is quoted as an example of an equal indemnity condition. Lesser conditions of indemnity provide a benefit greater than the price that is paid. Faith, baptism, and the eucharist are mentioned as examples of lesser indemnity conditions. Greater conditions of indemnity come about when a person fails in a lesser condition. In that case, a greater price must be paid to make up for the earlier failure. Abraham's attempted sacrifice of his son Isaac (Genesis 22:1–18) and the Israelites' 40 years of wandering in the wilderness under Moses (Numbers 14:34) are mentioned as examples of greater indemnity conditions.

The Divine Principle then explains that an indemnity condition must reverse the course by which the mistake or loss came about. Indemnity, at its core, is required of humans because God is pure, and purity cannot relate directly with impurity. Indemnification is the vehicle that allows a "just and righteous" God to work through mankind. Jesus' statement that God had forsaken him (Matt.27:46) and Christianity's history of martyrdom are mentioned as examples of this. The Divine Principle then states that human beings, not God or the angels, are the ones responsible for making indemnity conditions. In 2005, scholars Daske and Ashcraft explained the concept of indemnity:

To restart the process toward perfection, God has sent messiahs to Earth who could restore the true state of humanity's relationship with God. Before that can happen, however, humans must perform good deeds that cancel the bad effects of sin. Unificationists call this 'indemnity'. Showing love and devotion to one's fellow humans, especially within families, helps pay this indemnity.

Other Protestant Christian commentators have criticized the concept of indemnity as being contrary to the doctrine of sola fide. Christian historian Ruth Tucker said: "In simple language, indemnity is salvation by works." Rev. Keiko Kawasaki wrote: "The indemnity condition (of the Unification Church) is an oriental way of thinking, meaning a condition for atonement for sins (unlike Christianity)." Donald Tingle and Richard Fordyce, ministers with the Christian Church (Disciples of Christ) who debated two Unification Church theologians in 1977, wrote: "In short, indemnity is anything you want to make it, since you establish the conditions. The zeal and enthusiasm of the Unification Church members is not so much based on love for God as it is compulsion to indemnify one's own sins."

=== Ideal family ===
A doctrine of Rev. Moon's teachings and the Unification movement is that the messiah will part complete Jesus' work by marrying and raising the "ideal" and "sinless" family as an example for others to follow and so restore God's original plan for humanity. However, according to journalist Robert F. Worth, since the death of Sun Myung Moon, "his children have struggled to live up to their 'sinless' billing.

"They have spent much of the past decade fighting in court over his assets and legacy, ... One son was accused by his wife of cocaine addiction and domestic abuse. (He denied both claims and has since died.) Another son leaped to his death from a balcony at a Nevada casino. A third son, Hyung Jin "Sean" Moon, founded a separate, gun-centered church in Pennsylvania known as Rod of Iron Ministries, where followers do target practice with AR-15s and bring guns to church to be blessed. Hyung Jin wears a golden crown made of rifle shells and delivers hate-filled sermons against the Democratic Party. He also expects to become the king of America. He reviles his mother—who runs the international church in South Korea—as the "whore of Babylon."

=== Spending church funds in casinos ===
In Moon and Han's teachings, Las Vegas was described as a "city of Satan," and they aimed to amass believers to transform that hell into heaven. However, in 2022, reports from Shukan Bunshun and TBS News revealed that according to transaction records compiled between 2008 and 2011 by MGM Resorts International, Hak Ja Han, and 11 church executives lost approximately $6.52 million in Las Vegas casinos. According to a former domestic helper of Hak Ja Han, the religious president's favorite casino game was the slot machine.

A senior believer claims that the funds squandered in the casino were donations from Japanese believers. Internal church records specify that donations, totaling $9.51 million between 2009 and 2011, were intended for Las Vegas. A former Japanese chief of the church who participated in the church's Las Vegas tour testified that the church specifically instructed participants to carry $7,500 in cash as a donation, which was below the upper limit for customs declaration. Upon arrival in the U.S., they would hand over their donations and be given a tour of tourist attractions, such as the Grand Canyon, while only being able to meet Moon and Han once, unaware of their gambling activities in the casino.

=== Investigation by the United States House of Representatives ===
In 1977, the Subcommittee on International Organizations of the Committee on International Relations of the United States House of Representatives, reported that the Unification Church was established by the director of the Korean Central Intelligence Agency (KCIA), Kim Chong Pil. The committee also reported that the KCIA had used the movement to gain political influence with the United States, and some of its members had worked as volunteers in Congressional offices. Together they founded the Korean Cultural Freedom Foundation, a nonprofit organization that acted as a public diplomacy campaign for South Korea. The committee also investigated possible KCIA influence on the Unification Church's campaign in support of Nixon.

Unification Church official Dan Fefferman testified in August 1977 before the Fraser Committee. Testimony from Fefferman confirmed that he had social ties to officials within the South Korean embassy. Fefferman testified that he had arranged a meeting in 1975 between Republican aide Edwin Feulner of the Heritage Foundation and South Korean Minister Kim Yung Hwan, to potentially put together a group of congressional aides who would travel to South Korea. Hwan was the then-station chief for the KCIA.

During his testimony, Fefferman refused to answer nine questions from the subcommittee, saying that they violated his constitutional rights to freedom of religion and association. The subcommittee recommended that Fefferman be cited for contempt of Congress. Fefferman, speaking to The Michigan Daily in 1980, said the subcommittee's recommendations were never taken up and no charges were pressed.

=== Defamation lawsuit against the Daily Mail ===
In 1978, the Daily Mail, a British tabloid newspaper, published an article with the headline: "The Church That Breaks Up Families." The article accused the Unification Church of brainwashing and separating families. The British Unification Church's director Dennis Orme filed a libel suit against the Daily Mail and Associated Newspapers, its parent company, resulting in one of the longest civil actions in British legal history – lasting six months. Orme and the Unification Church lost the libel case and the appeal, and were refused permission to take their case to the House of Lords.

The original case heard 117 witnesses, including American anti-cult psychiatrist Margaret Thaler Singer. In the original case, the Unification Church was ordered to pay Associated Newspapers £750,000 in costs which was maintained after appeal. The jury of the original case not only awarded Associated Newspapers costs, but it and the judge requested that the Attorney General re-examine the Unification Church's charitable status, which after a lengthy investigation from 1986 to 1988 was not removed.

According to George Chryssides, about half of the Unification Church's 500 full-time members in the UK moved to the United States. The Unification Church sold seven of its twelve principal church centers after the ruling. Other anti-cultists in countries such as Germany sought to incorporate the London High Court's decision into law. The Unification Church has won other libel and defamation cases in the United Kingdom, including a similar case against The Daily Telegraph.

=== United States v. Sun Myung Moon ===
In 1982, Moon was imprisoned in the United States after a jury found him guilty of willfully filing false federal income tax returns and conspiracy. The Unification Church of the United States members launched a public-relations campaign in response. Booklets, letters, and videotapes were mailed to approximately 300,000 Christian leaders in the United States. Many of them signed petitions protesting the government's case. The American Baptist Churches in the U.S.A., the National Council of Churches, the National Black Catholic Clergy Caucus, and the Southern Christian Leadership Conference filed briefs in support of Moon. Moon served 13 months of the sentence at the Federal Correctional Institution, Danbury in Danbury, Connecticut. The case was protested as a case of selective prosecution and a threat to religious freedom by, among others, Jerry Falwell, head of Moral Majority, Joseph Lowery, head of the Southern Christian Leadership Conference, Harvey Cox, a professor of Divinity at Harvard, and Eugene McCarthy, United States Senator and former Democratic Party presidential candidate.

=== Crown of Peace event in Washington DC ===
On March 23, 2004, at a ceremony in the Dirksen Senate Office Building, in Washington, D.C., Moon crowned himself with what was called the "Crown of Peace." Lawmakers who attended included Senator Mark Dayton (D-Minn.), Representatives Roscoe Bartlett (R-Md.) and Elijah Cummings (D-Md.), as well as former Representative Walter Fauntroy (D-D.C.). Key organizers of the event included George Augustus Stallings Jr., a former Roman Catholic priest who had been married by Moon, and Michael Jenkins, the president of the Unification Church of the United States at that time. Rep. Danny K. Davis (D-Ill.) played an active role in the ceremony. The New York Times, in 2008, suggested that the participation of federal elected officials in this event was a possible violation of the principle of separation of church and state in United States law.

=== In Japan (1970–2025) ===
The Unification Church in Japan has faced several controversies:

- Rebranding – In 1997, the Japanese Unification Church's request to change its name was rejected due to ongoing lawsuits. In 2015, the name change to "Family Federation for World Peace and Unification" was approved, though the approval process reportedly involved unusual reports.
- Spiritual sales – The Unification Church in Japan faced accusations of pressuring members into financial ruin through "spiritual sales." This led to 35,000 compensation claims and $206 million recovered. The church claims it has emphasized legal compliance and stopped these practices since 2009.
- The assassination of Shinzo Abe – Tetsuya Yamagami blamed the Unification Church for his family's bankruptcy; he decided to kill Abe after seeing a video greeting in which he publicly endorsed the Moonies during a virtual rally for the Universal Peace Federation in 2021. The assassination led Japan's ruling party (the Liberal Democrats) to cut ties with the church in August 2022.
- Revocation of religious corporation status and subsequent order of disbandment by the Japanese government – On October 12, 2023, Japan's Ministry of Education announced plans to dissolve the Unification Church under Article 81 of the Religious Juridical Person Law, citing deviations from legitimate religious practices. This marked the first such action against a religious organization without a criminal conviction. The church stated its intention to contest the order legally. As of March 7, 2024, the government increased monitoring of the church's assets under a new law aimed at addressing unfair solicitation practices. Subsequently, on March 25, 2025, the Tokyo District Court ordered the dissolution of the Unification Church's Japanese branch. The ruling revoked the church's legal religious judicial person status, removing its tax-exempt privileges and requiring the liquidation of its assets. However, the church appealed the decision to the Tokyo High Court, citing the request to dissolve was a "serious threat to the human rights and religious freedom of its followers". The Tokyo High Court and the Supreme Court confirms the decision, calling the dissolution order "necessary and inevitable" but "does not violate constitutional protections of religious freedom because it affects only the corporation’s legal personality and not the believers’ ability to practice their faith".
- Civil lawsuits against Japanese critics and government – The Unification Church and its affiliates filed lawsuits against Japanese media, lawyers, journalists, and ex-members discussing its fundraising and recruitment. Legal actions increased after ties with Japanese politicians were revealed post-Abe's assassination. Critics allege these lawsuits are to silence opposition.
- Child adoption – The Unification Church in Japan was investigated for unauthorized child transfers between members' families since 2018. They reported 31 adoptions but denied acting as intermediaries. Following scrutiny, the church removed references to child adoption from its handbook in February 2023.

=== Support for North Korea's development of nuclear weapons ===
According to Defense Intelligence Agency (DIA) reports in August and September 1994, Moon donated 450 billion yen to Kim Il Sung during his stay in North Korea from November 30, 1991, to December 7, 1992. Those same DIA reports explained an "economic cooperation" for the reconstruction of North Korea's economy was in place. This included establishing a joint venture developing tourism at Kimkangsan, investing in the development of the Tumangang River, in addition to investing in the construction of the "light industry" base located in Wonsan. Most of the money was said to have been donated to the Unification Church by Japanese believers. According to the former chief executive of Pyeonghwa Motors, a Unification Church auto company, the money collected from Japanese devotees was first transferred to South Korea and money laundered, then transferred to Hong Kong and finally to North Korea. He said he had a close relationship with Ju Kyu-chang, a senior member of the Workers' Party of Korea and its weapons development chief.

Baek Seung-joo, a former South Korean vice defense minister, has analyzed that money donated by Japanese followers of the Unification Church was diverted to North Korea's nuclear development and development of intercontinental ballistic missiles. According to Masuo Oe, who was the public relations director of the Unification Church, when Moon said to Kim Il Sung in a meeting, "Please be my brother," Kim Il Sung replied, "Sure, why not?" According to him, believers heard this anecdote and admired that the Messiah had brought Satan to his knees with the power of love. This was a symbolic event that marked a major shift in the anti-communist policies of the Unification Church.

According to a 2016 South Korean Defense Ministry parliamentary report, a Tokyo-run company operated by members of the Unification Church sold a Russian Golf II-class submarine still loaded with missile launchers to North Korea in 1994, disguised as scrap metal, and the technology was then diverted to North Korea's development of submarine-launched ballistic missiles. The Unification Church has denied having any relationship with the company.

=== Controversy in South Korea ===
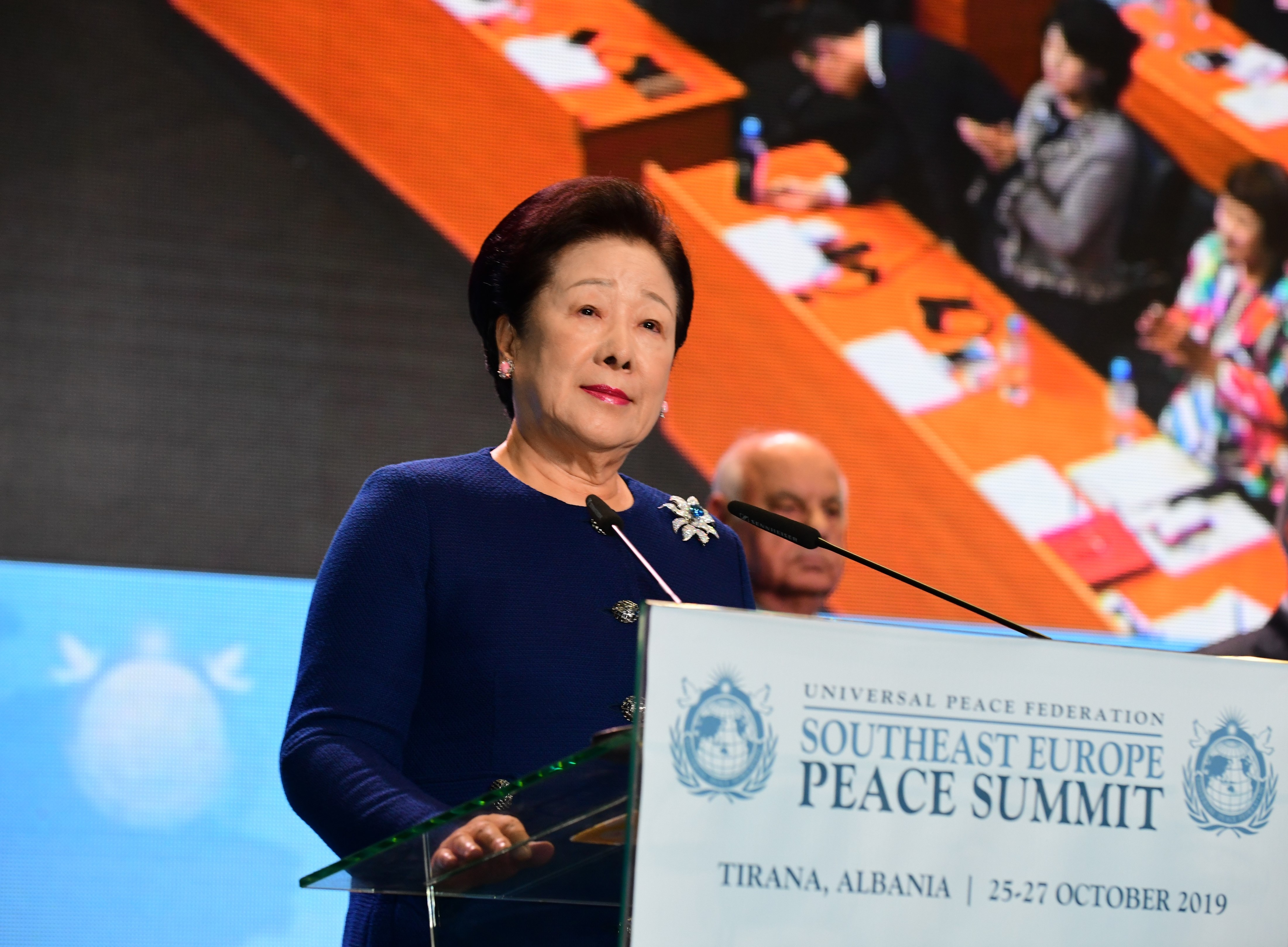
Unification Church leader Hak Ja Han was arrested in South Korea in September 2025

In South Korea, the Unification Church has been criticized for supporting the interests of Japan over those of South Korea. South Korean media reported links between the UC and Japanese conservatives, referring to them as Chinil (친일) or Sin-chinil (신친일). Some South Korean media reported a connection between Yoon Suk-yeol's pro-Japanese foreign policy and the UC.

Since late July 2024, protests at Cheonjeonggung Palace in Gapyeong began with demands for Vice President Jung Won-joo's resignation, following corruption allegations involving aides close to Hak Ja Han. By late September, the Unification Church Members' Emergency Response Committee joined the demonstrations, which spread by October to major church sites like Cheongshim Peace World Center in Gapyeong and Cheonwon Temple in Seoul, continuing calls for Jung's resignation.

The conservative People Power Party (PPP) and the liberal Democratic Party (DPK) are embroiled in a political scandal involving allegations of receiving illegal political funds and donations from the Unification Church. Hak Ja Han, the leader of the Unification Church, was arrested in South Korea in September 2025 on various corruption charges, including bribery and embezzlement. Also indicted in 2025 were Jeong Won-ju, who served as Han's chief of staff, and former World Headquarters Director-General Yun Young-ho. On September 11, 2025, the National Assembly approved a motion to arrest former PPP floor leader Kweon Seong-dong on charges of bribery from the Unification Church.

=== Secrecy and esoteric ===
The Unification Church is sometimes said to be a secret society in that it keeps some of its doctrines secret from non-members, a practice that is sometimes called "heavenly deception." In 1979, critics D. Tingle and R. Fordyce commented: "How different the openness of Christianity is to the attitude of Reverend Moon and his followers who are often reluctant to reveal to the public many of their basic doctrines." Since the 1990s, many Unification texts that were formerly regarded as esoteric have been posted on the Family Federation for World Peace and Unification's official websites.

=== "Crazy for God" ===
In The Way of God's Will, a collection of sayings popular among church members, Moon is quoted as saying: "We leaders should leave the tradition that we have become crazy for God." In 1979 Unification Church critic Christopher Edwards titled a memoir about his experiences in the six months he spent as a church member: Crazy for God: The Nightmare of Cult Life..

== Persecution ==
=== Germany ===
In November 1995, German authorities blacklisted the founders of the Unification Church (Reverend Sun Myung Moon and his wife, Hak Ja Han Moon) through the Schengen Information System and thus forbid entry to 12 European countries. The period of exclusion was extended several times. After 12 years on October 24, 2006, the German Federal Constitutional Court ruled that previous court rulings and authorities' treatment of the Unification Church in the period from November 1995 violated Article 4 paragraph 1 (Freedom of faith and conscience is inviolable) and paragraph 2 (undisturbed practice is guaranteed) of the German Constitution and is repealed must reimburse the UC for the necessary expenses (articles 2 and 3 of the ruling). It also stated that the authorities' defense was based on rumors and assumptions (article 15 of the ruling) and the previous ruling of the Higher Administrative Court was based on weighting religious matters, which is not permitted by state authorities (article 27 of the ruling). Court by this decision rejects with immediate effect the rationale of the German Federal Ministry of the Interior for the 1995 immigration exclusion and not granting an entry visa.

=== France ===
In March 1982, a 21-year-old woman, Claire Château, who was on the central street of Dijon distributing brochures, was pulled into a moving car shouting for help. After a psychological examination showed that she was in good mental health with no traces of alleged "brainwashing", seven people, family members, and Union nationale des associations de défense des familles et de l'individu (ADFI) "professional deprogrammers" were accused by the Dijon Regional Criminal Investigation Department (Service Régional de Police Judiciaire de Dijon) of kidnapping under §341 of the French Penal Code to the Besançon Court of Justice. The case contributed to the gradual abandonment of abductions and deprogramming attempts.

=== Russia ===
In 2000, Russia excluded Patrick Francis Nolan from reentry, holding him captive at the airport overnight based on FSB material concerning countering non-traditional religions. The visa was repeatedly canceled on reentry without an explanation, which separated him from his son, who stayed in Russia, for almost one year. European Court of Human Rights (ECHR) in 2009 in the case Nolan and K. v. Russia stated, that Russia failed to comply with or violated Articles 38§1a, 9, 8, 5§1, 5§5 and Article 1 of Protocol No. 7 of the Convention for the Protection of Human Rights and Fundamental Freedoms (Convention) and decided that Russia should pay a sum of €7,810 for damages. In 2005–2006, Russia forcibly expelled John Alphonsus Corley and Shuji Igarashi and separated them from their families staying in Russia. Mr. Igarashi was held in detention for 3 days in inhuman conditions. Newspaper Rossiyskaya Gazeta published an article "ComMoonism has come to the Urals" explaining the reason as "State campaign against the Unification Church." In the 2022 case Corley and Others v. Russia, the ECHR stated that Russia violated Articles 1, 2, 9, 8, 3, and 5 of the convention and decided that Russia should pay a sum of €30,270 for damages.

=== United States ===
On Thanksgiving 1979, the parents of 28-year-old Thomas Ward conspired with 31 other people to kidnap him (for the second time) and hold him captive for 35 days. He suffered verbal and physical abuse in attempts to "de-program" him of his religious beliefs. Attempts failed and 33 people heard the verdict on the crimes of conspiracy, battery, false imprisonment, intentional infliction of emotional distress, and grand larceny. The 4th U.S. Circuit Court of Appeals ruled on April 18, 1980, that federal civil rights laws protect against religious discrimination. The judgment contradicted the (then common) "parental immunity" principle in such cases. Thomas J. Ward graduated in 1981 from the Unification Theological Seminary and in 2019 became its president. In 1991, Carlton Sherwood in his book Inquisition: The Persecution and Prosecution of the Reverend Sun Myung Moon accused Congress, courts, state agencies, and the press of "worst kind of religious prejudice and racial bigotry" against the church, its leaders and followers as determined attempt to erase the church from the United States.

=== Communist Czechoslovakia ===
The movement sent missionary Emilia Steberle to communist countries in 1968 during the Prague Spring to Czechoslovakia. She succeeded in building an underground movement during the early Normalization. The group was soon observed by the StB (communist secret police) since 1971. The communist regime persecuted members of the group as undesirable for the establishment. In 1973, during an operation called "FAMILIA", almost 30 members were captured and arrested. In the following months of imprisonment in a communist jail, one of the members, Marie Živná, who resisted interrogation methods, died on April 11, 1974, at the age of 24, with unclear reasons. Witnesses who saw her body before the burial testified that she had unnaturally white hair, concluding that she was tortured. The funeral in Svojanov became a demonstration against the communist regime. On October 10, 1974, the Supreme Court in Bratislava sentenced 14 young people to prison terms ranging from 18 months to 4 years and 4 months. Marie Živná is the first officially recognized martyr of the Unification Movement behind the Iron Curtain, for her exemplary fight for freedom.

== Related organizations and groups ==
Moon believed in the literal Kingdom of God on earth to be brought about by human effort, motivating his establishment of numerous groups, some that are not strictly religious in their purposes. Moon was not directly involved with managing the day-to-day activities of the organizations that he indirectly oversaw, yet all of them attribute the inspiration behind their work to his leadership and teachings.

== See also ==
- Blessing ceremony of the Unification Church
- Cabal
- Eastern Lightning
- List of Unification movement people
- New Apostolic Reformation
- P'ikareum
- Theocracy
- Unification Church and politics
- Unification Church of the United States
- Utopianism

== Bibliography ==
- Sontag, Frederick. 1977. Sun Myung Moon and the Unification Church, Abingdon Press. ISBN 0-687-40622-6
- Bryant, M. Darrol, and Herbert Warren Richardson. 1978. A Time for consideration: a scholarly appraisal of the Unification Church. New York: E. Mellen Press. ISBN 978-0-88946-954-9
- Tingle, D. and Fordyce, R. 1979, Phases and Faces of the Moon: A Critical Examination of the Unification Church and its Principles, Hicksville, NY: Exposition Press ISBN 0-682-49264-7
- Kim, Young Oon, 1980, Unification Theology, Barrytown, NY: Unification Theological Seminary, LCCN 80-52872
- Matczak, Sebastian, Unificationism: A New Philosophy and World View (Philosophical Questions Series, No 11) (1982) New York: Louvain.
- Barker, Eileen, The Making of a Moonie: Choice or Brainwashing? (1984) Blackwell's, Oxford, UK ISBN 0-631-13246-5.
- Bjornstad, James. 1984. Sun Myung & the Unification Church. Rev. ed. Minneapolis, Minn.: Bethany House Publishers. 57 p. N.B.: Rev. ed. of The Moon Is Not the Sun, which had been published in 1976. ISBN 0-87123-301-0
- Durst, Mose. 1984. To bigotry, no sanction: Reverend Sun Myung Moon and the Unification Church. Chicago: Regnery Gateway. ISBN 978-0-89526-609-5
- Bromley, David G. (1985). "Financing the Millennium: The Economic Structure of the Unificationist Movement". Journal for the Scientific Study of Religion. 24 (3): 253–274. doi:10.2307/1385816. JSTOR 1385816.
- Fichter, Joseph Henry. 1985. The holy family of father Moon. Kansas City, Mo: Leaven Press. ISBN 978-0-934134-13-2
- Gullery, Jonathan. 1986. The Path of a pioneer: the early days of Reverend Sun Myung Moon and the Unification Church. New York: HSA Publications. ISBN 978-0-910621-50-2
- Biermans, J. 1986, The Odyssey of New Religious Movements, Persecution, Struggle, Legitimation: A Case Study of the Unification Church Lewiston, New York and Queenston, Ontario: The Edwin Melton Press ISBN 0-88946-710-2
- Sherwood, Carlton. 1991. Inquisition: The Persecution and Prosecution of the Reverend Sun Myung Moon. Washington, D.C.: Regnery Gateway. ISBN 978-0-89526-532-6
- Chryssides, George D., The Advent of Sun Myung Moon: The Origins, Beliefs and Practices of the Unification Church (1991) London, Macmillan Professional and Academic Ltd. The author is professor of religious studies at the University of Wolverhampton, United Kingdom.
- Yamamoto, J. Isamu, 1995, Unification Church, Grand Rapids, Michigan: Zondervan ISBN 0-310-70381-6
- Hong, Nansook, In the Shadow of the Moons: My Life in the Reverend Sun Myung Moon's Family. Little Brown & Company; ISBN 0-316-34816-3, 1998.
- Introvigne, M., 2000, The Unification Church, Signature Books, ISBN 1-56085-145-7
- Ward, Thomas J. 2006, March to Moscow: the role of the Reverend Sun Myung Moon in the collapse of communism. St. Paul, Minn: Paragon House. ISBN 978-1-885118-16-5
- Hickey, Patrick 2009, Tahoe Boy: A journey back home. John, Maryland: Seven Locks Press. ISBN 978-0982229361
- Moon, Sun Myung, 2009, As a Peace-Loving Global Citizen. Gimm-Young Publishers ISBN 0-7166-0299-7
