= Gordon Freedman =

American author, journalist, and producer

Gordon Freedman is an American education technologist, former film and television producer and journalist.

Freedman is currently the president of the National Laboratory for Education Transformation (NLET), an educational nonprofit, which he founded in 2010. NLET is based in California and advocates for key transformations in mathematics education, STEM outreach, career and technical education (CTE), workforce development and education-to-employment solutions. Within NLET, Freedman heads MitoWorld, a global web-hub for research and information sharing within the mitochondrial research and clinical communities.

== Early life and education ==
Gordon Freedman grew up in Charlevoix, Michigan and studied at Michigan State University, where he graduated with a Bachelor of Arts in Communications.

== Career ==
Freedman's early work included staff service on several Congressional committees. While in college, he was a staff member of the United States Senate Watergate Committee. He completed college, and then returned to Washington as a committee investigator for the U.S House of Representatives Committee on Post Office and Civil Service. In 1978, he was a staff investigator on the Subcommittee on International Organizations of the Committee on International Relations during the Koreagate investigation.

After leaving government service, Freedman transitioned into media and production. He worked as a filmmaker and television producer, developing and producing projects that explored social, cultural, and historical issues. His work in film and television contributed to his broader interest in public communication and educational media.

Freedman later moved into education and nonprofit leadership, founding the National Laboratory for Education Transformation, a nonprofit focused on rethinking education systems, workforce readiness, and technology-enabled learning. NLET works with schools, higher education institutions, and workforce organizations to develop strategies and technologies that support students, displaced workers, and lifelong learners.

Freedman co-founded MitoWorld whose aim is to establish mitochondrial medicine as a more structured clinical and research field, comparable to cancer or diabetes research. Through MitoWorld, he has supported public education, convened expert communities, and promoted the development of research in the field of mitochondrial science.

In 2022, Freedman began serving as an advisor to GoEducate, Inc., an Austin-based education-to-employment software platform. GoEducate is designed as a cloud-based system that connects learners, colleges, and employers across regional, state, and national levels.

=== Mitochondrial research and development ===
Following a personal mitochondrial disease diagnosis, Freedman established MitoWorld, a communication and information hub for the mitochondrial research and clinical communities, supported by a scientific advisory board drawn from institutions including Children's Hospital of Philadelphia, Northwestern University, and the University of Cambridge, among others. Freedman also founded MITOS.Global, a distributed collaborative platform supporting cross-disciplinary mitochondrial research projects for laboratories and institutions.

=== Education Industry ===
From 1996 to 1999, Freedman served as director for business development at the startup of California State University Monterey Bay. Freedman was vice president of Knowledge Exchange, a media publishing company founded by financier Michael Milken in 1994.

Freedman is the managing director of Knowledge Base, LLC, a consulting firm whose clients included Michigan State University, University of California, O'Reilly Media, Capella University, eCollege and WebCT. He helped to build Prometheus, a course management program at George Washington University, of which he was executive vice president from 2000 until 2002. From 2002 to 2004, he was the acting CEO of Textcentric.

He co-founded the K-8 Charter, International School of Monterey in 2000, and served on its board until 2007. He was the Vice President of Global Education Strategy for educational technology company Blackboard Inc. from 2005 to 2011. From 2008 to 2011, he was the Blackboard Institute's executive director.

In the late 1990s, Freedman transitioned into education policy, innovation and education technology. He was part of the start-up of the California State University, Monterey Bay and was the vice president of the global education strategy at Blackboard Inc., before founding the National Laboratory for Education Transformation (NLET) in 2011, a research and development nonprofit where he continues to serve president and member of the board.

=== Nonprofit ===
At NLET (since 2011), Freedman is directing a research-and-development nonprofit organized around four program areas: mathematics education and competency-based learning tools, delivered through Just In Time Math; workforce and talent-marketplace infrastructure, including the GoEducate platform; semiconductor and advanced-manufacturing workforce development; and mitochondrial science communication and research.

=== Film and television ===
Prior to his work in education, STEM and workforce development, Freedman lived in Los Angeles and worked in the entertainment industry on fact-based dramas and documentaries. Over the course of his career, he produced a number of television films, miniseries and series including To Heal a Nation (1988), Baby M (1988) and the Fox series DEA (1990). Freedman also produced three feature films, Money for Nothing (John Cusak, 1999), To Walk with Lions (Richard Harris, 1999) and A Brief History of Time (1991). Freedman is also an author of non-fiction political books, including Gifts of Deceit (1980) and Winter of Fire (1990).

In 1991, he produced the documentary film adaptation of Stephen Hawking's A Brief History of Time, which was directed by Errol Morris. The film won a Grand Jury Prize at the Sundance Film Festival.

=== Journalism and Writing ===
Freedman became a journalist in Washington, DC. First as a stringer for the Washington Post, then as a Washington Correspondent for the Atlanta Journal-Constitution, and then as a producer for ABC 20/20 and Nightline.

In 1980, he co-wrote Gifts of Deceit, an account of the Koreagate scandal and the committee's investigations, with Robert Boettcher. In 1990, Freedman co-wrote Winter of Fire with Richard O. Collin, which dealt with US Army general James L. Dozier's kidnapping by the Italian terrorist group the Red Brigades.

He contributed to the volume of Virtual Schools: Planning For Success, published by Teachers College Press in 2005. In the book, Freedman discussed the possible applications of technology within a virtual learning environment.

=== Government ===
Freedman worked on Capitol Hill as a researcher and investigator for five years, beginning with the Senate Watergate Committee while still in college. He was also the committee investigator for the U.S. House of Representatives Committee on Civil Service. and he was a staff investigator on the Subcommittee on International Organizations of the Committee on International Relations during the Koreagate scandal.

=== Writing and Publication ===
In addition to his policy and media work, Freedman is the author of several nonfiction works. His publications include Gifts of Deceit (1980), which examined Korean influence in American politics, and Winter of Fire (1992), among other essays and commentaries on education and health.

== Filmography ==
| Year | Title | Credited as |
|---|---|---|
| 1999 | To Walk with Lions | Co-executive producer |
| 1994 | Marilyn Monroe: Life After Death | Director |
| 1994 | Inferno on US 17 | Writer |
| 1993 | Money for Nothing | Executive producer |
| 1992 | The Making of 'A Brief History of Time' | Executive producer |
| 1991 | A Brief History of Time | Executive producer |
| 1990 | DEA | Executive producer |
| 1990 | The Media Show | Self |
| 1988 | To Heal a Nation | Co-producer |
| 1988 | Baby M | Producer |

== Bibliography ==
=== Books ===
Books authored or co-authored by Gordon Freedman
| Year | Title | Publisher |
|---|---|---|
| 2005 | Virtual Schools: Planning For Success | Teachers College Press |
| 1990 | Winter of Fire | Penguin Group |
| 1980 | Gifts of Deceit | Holt, Rinehart and Winston |

=== Selected articles ===
- "The Education-Employment Crisis: A Critical Overview". Hungry Minds. October 2021.
- "Bursting the Campus Technology Bubble: Where are the Flying Cars? ". NLET. June 2019.
- "Higher Ed Needs to Bridge the ‘App Gap’ to Reach Students". EdSurge. November 2018 .
- "GoogleTM versus MeTM: Who Owns the Rights to My Digital DNA?". Policy Futures in Education, 12(4), 482–490. 2014.
- "Cloud Technology Can Lift the Fog Over Higher Education". The Chronicle of Higher Education. 2012
- "Eyes Closed Tight". TechLearning Magazine. May 2006.
- "The coming transformation of the textbook". Logos. 16(3), 120–126.
- "The Changing Nature of Museums". Curator: The Museum Journal. 43(4), 295–306. 2000.
