= Ethnologue =

Catalogue of the world's languages

- Website type: Language database
- Available in: English
- Founded: 1951
- Headquarters: Dallas, United States
- Owner: SIL Global
- Founder: Richard S. Pittman
- Editors: David M. Eberhard; Gary F. Simons; Charles D. Fennig
- Website: www.ethnologue.com
- Commercial: Yes
- Registration: Required to access most content since 2019
- ISSN: 1946-9675
- OCLC number: 43349556

Ethnologue: Languages of the World (stylized as Ethnoloɠue) is an annual reference publication in print and online that provides statistics and other information on the living languages of the world. It is the world's most comprehensive catalogue of languages. It was first issued in 1951 and is now published by SIL Global, an American evangelical Christian non-profit organization.

== Overview ==
Ethnologue is published by SIL Global (formerly the Summer Institute of Linguistics), a Christian linguistic service organization with an international office in Dallas, Texas. The organization studies numerous minority languages to facilitate language development and translate portions of the Bible into these languages. Despite the Christian orientation of its publisher, Ethnologue is not ideologically or theologically biased.

Ethnologue includes alternative names and autonyms, the number of L1 and L2 speakers, language prestige, domains of use, literacy rates, locations, dialects, language classification, linguistic affiliations, typology, language maps, country maps, publication and use in media, availability of the Bible in each language and dialect described, religious affiliations of speakers, a cursory description of revitalization efforts where reported, intelligibility and lexical similarity with other dialects and languages, writing scripts, an estimate of language viability using the Expanded Graded Intergenerational Disruption Scale (EGIDS), and bibliographic resources. Coverage varies depending on language. For instance, as of 2008, information on word order was present for 15% of entries while religious affiliations were mentioned for 38% of languages. According to Lyle Campbell "language maps are highly valuable" and most country maps are of high quality and user-friendly.

Ethnologue gathers information from SIL's thousands of field linguists, surveys done by linguists and literacy specialists, observations of Bible translators, and crowdsourced contributions. SIL's field linguists use an online collaborative research system to review current data, update it, or request its removal. SIL has a team of editors by geographical area who prepare reports to Ethnologue's general editor. These reports combine opinions from SIL area experts and feedback solicited from non-SIL linguists. Editors have to find compromises when opinions differ. Most of SIL's linguists have taken three to four semesters of graduate linguistics courses, and half of them have a master's degree. They're trained by 300 PhD linguists in SIL.

The determination of what characteristics define a single language depends upon sociolinguistic evaluation by various scholars; as the preface to Ethnologue states, "Not all scholars share the same set of criteria for what constitutes a 'language' and what features define a 'dialect'." The criteria used by Ethnologue are mutual intelligibility and the existence or absence of a common literature or ethnolinguistic identity. The number of languages identified has been steadily increasing, from 5,445 in the 10th edition (in 1984) to 6,909 in the 16th (in 2009), and now 7,170 (2026) partly due to governments recognizing mutually intelligible varieties as separate languages, and partly due to SIL establishing new Bible translation needs. Ethnologue codes were used as the base to create the new ISO 639-3 international standard. Since 2007, Ethnologue relies only on this standard, administered by SIL International, to determine what is listed as a language.

In addition to choosing a primary name for a language, Ethnologue provides listings of other name(s) for the language and any dialects that are used by its speakers, government, foreigners and neighbors. Also included are any names that have been commonly referenced historically, regardless of whether a name is considered official, politically correct or offensive; this allows more complete historical research to be done. These lists of names are not necessarily complete.

== History ==
Ethnologue was founded in 1951 by Richard S. Pittman and was initially focused on minority languages, to share information on Bible translation needs. The first edition included information on 46 languages. Hand-drawn maps were introduced in the fourth edition (1953). The seventh edition (1969) listed 4,493 languages. In 1971, Ethnologue expanded its coverage to all known languages of the world.

The Ethnologue database was created in 1971 at the University of Oklahoma under a grant from the National Science Foundation. In 1974 the database was moved to Cornell University. Since 2000, the database has been maintained by SIL International in their Dallas headquarters. In 1997 (13th edition), the website became the primary means of access.

In 1984, Ethnologue released a three-letter coding system, called 'SIL code', to identify each language that it described. This set of codes significantly exceeded the scope of other existing standards, e.g. ISO 639-1 and ISO 639-2.

The 14th edition, published in 2000, included 7,148 language codes. In 2002, Ethnologue was asked to work with the International Organization for Standardization (ISO) to integrate its codes into a draft international standard. Ethnologue codes have then been adopted by ISO as the international standard, ISO 639-3. The 15th edition of Ethnologue was the first edition to use this standard. This standard is now administered separately from Ethnologue. SIL International is the registration authority for language names and codes, according to rules established by ISO. Since then Ethnologue relies on the standard to determine what is listed as a language. In only one case, Ethnologue and the ISO standards treat languages slightly differently. ISO 639–3 considers Akan to be a macrolanguage consisting of two distinct languages, Twi and Fante, whereas Ethnologue considers Twi and Fante to be dialects of a single language (Akan), since they are mutually intelligible. This anomaly resulted because the ISO 639–2 standard has separate codes for Twi and Fante, which have separate literary traditions, and all 639–2 codes for individual languages are automatically part of 639–3, even though 639–3 would not normally assign them separate codes.

In 2014, with the 17th edition, Ethnologue introduced a numerical code for language status using a framework called EGIDS (Expanded Graded Intergenerational Disruption Scale), an elaboration of Fishman's GIDS (Graded Intergenerational Disruption Scale). It ranks a language from 0 for an international language to 10 for an extinct language, i.e. a language with which nobody retains a sense of ethnic identity.

In 2015, SIL's funds decreased and in December 2015, Ethnologue launched a metered paywall to cover its cost, as it is financially self-sustaining. Users in high-income countries who wanted to refer to more than seven pages of data per month had to buy a paid subscription. The 18th edition released that year included a new section on language policy country by country.

In 2016, Ethnologue added data about language planning agencies to the 19th edition.

As of 2017, Ethnologue's 20th edition described 237 language families including 86 language isolates and six typological categories, namely sign languages, creoles, pidgins, mixed languages, constructed languages, and as yet unclassified languages.

The early focus of the Ethnologue was on native use (L1) but was gradually expanded to cover L2 use as well.

In 2019, Ethnologue stopped providing free trial views and introduced a hard paywall to cover its nearly $1 million in annual operating costs (website maintenance, security, researchers, and SIL's 5,000 field linguists). Subscriptions start at $480 per person per year, while full access costs $2,400 per person per year. Users in low and middle-income countries as defined by the World Bank are eligible for free access and there are discounts for libraries and independent researchers. Subscribers are mostly institutions: 40% of the world's top 50 universities subscribe to Ethnologue, and it is also sold to business intelligence firms and Fortune 500 companies. The introduction of the paywall was harshly criticized by the community of linguists who rely on Ethnologue to do their work and cannot afford the subscription The same year, Ethnologue launched its contributor program to fill gaps and improve accuracy, allowing contributors to submit corrections and additions and to get a complimentary access to the website. Ethnologue's editors gradually review crowdsourced contributions before publication. As 2019 was the International Year of Indigenous Languages, this edition focused on language loss: it added the date when the last fluent speaker of the language died, standardized the age range of language users, and improved the EGIDS estimates.

In 2020, the 23rd edition listed 7,117 living languages, an increase of 6 living languages from the 22nd edition. In this edition, Ethnologue expanded its coverage of immigrant languages: previous editions only had full entries for languages considered to be "established" within a country. From this edition, Ethnologue includes data about the first and second languages of refugees, temporary foreign workers and immigrants.

In 2021, the 24th edition had 7,139 modern languages, an increase of 22 living languages from the 23rd edition. Editors especially improved data about language shift in this edition.

In 2022, the 25th edition listed a total of 7,151 living languages, an increase of 12 living languages from the 24th edition. This edition specifically improved the use of languages in education.

In 2023, the 26th edition listed a total of 7,168 living languages, an increase of 17 living languages from the 25th edition.

In 2024, the 27th edition listed a total of 7,164 living languages, a decrease of 4 living languages from the 26th edition.

In 2025, the 28th edition listed a total of 7,159 living languages, a decrease of 5 living languages from the 27th edition.

In 2026, the 29th edition listed a total of 7,170 living languages, an increase of 11 living languages from the 28th edition. This represents the highest number of living languages that have been described in an edition of Ethnologue.

== Reception, reliability, and use ==
In 1986, William Bright, then editor of the journal Language, wrote of Ethnologue that it "is indispensable for any reference shelf on the languages of the world". The 2003 International Encyclopedia of Linguistics described Ethnologue as "a comprehensive listing of the world's languages, with genetic classification", and follows Ethnologue's classification. In 2005, linguists Lindsay J. Whaley and Lenore Grenoble considered that Ethnologue "continues to provide the most comprehensive and reliable count of numbers of speakers of the world's languages", still they recognize that "individual language surveys may have far more accurate counts for a specific language, but The Ethnologue is unique in bringing together speaker statistics on a global scale". In 2006, computational linguists John C. Paolillo and Anupam Das conducted a systematic evaluation of available information on language populations for the UNESCO Institute for Statistics. They reported that Ethnologue and Linguasphere were the only comprehensive sources of information about language populations and that Ethnologue had more specific information. They concluded that: "the language statistics available today in the form of the Ethnologue population counts are already good enough to be useful" According to linguist William Poser, Ethnologue was, as of 2006, the "best single source of information" on language classification. In 2008 linguists Lyle Campbell and Verónica Grondona highly commended Ethnologue in Language. They described it as a highly valuable catalogue of the world's languages that "has become the standard reference" and whose "usefulness is hard to overestimate". They concluded that Ethnologue was "truly excellent, highly valuable, and the very best book of its sort available."

In a review of Ethnologue's 2009 edition in Ethnopolitics, Richard O. Collin, professor of politics, noted that "Ethnologue has become a standard resource for scholars in the other social sciences: anthropologists, economists, sociologists and, obviously, sociolinguists". According to Collin, Ethnologue is "stronger in languages spoken by indigenous peoples in economically less-developed portions of the world" and "when recent in-depth country-studies have been conducted, information can be very good; unfortunately [...] data are sometimes old".

In 2012, linguist Asya Pereltsvaig described Ethnologue as "a reasonably good source of thorough and reliable geographical and demographic information about the world's languages". She added in 2021 that its maps "are generally fairly accurate although they often depict the linguistic situation as it once was or as someone might imagine it to be but not as it actually is". Linguist George Tucker Childs wrote in 2012 that: "Ethnologue is the most widely referenced source for information on languages of the world", but he added that regarding African languages, "when evaluated against recent field experience [Ethnologue] seems at least out of date". In 2014, Ethnologue admitted that some of its data was out-of-date and switched from a four-year publication cycle (in print and online) to yearly online updates.

In 2017, Robert Phillipson and Tove Skutnabb-Kangas described Ethnologue as "the most comprehensive global source list for (mostly oral) languages". According to the 2018 Oxford Research Encyclopedia of Linguistics, Ethnologue is a "comprehensive, frequently updated [database] on languages and language families'. According to quantitative linguists Simon Greenhill, Ethnologue offers, as of 2018, "sufficiently accurate reflections of speaker population size". Linguists Lyle Campbell and Kenneth Lee Rehg wrote in 2018 that Ethnologue was "the best source that lists the non-endangered languages of the world". Lyle Campbell and Russell Barlow also noted that the 2017 edition of Ethnologue "improved [its] classification markedly". They note that Ethnologue's genealogy is similar to that of the World Atlas of Language Structures (WALS) but different from that of the Catalogue of Endangered Languages (ELCat) and Glottolog. Linguist Lisa Matthewson commented in 2020 that Ethnologue offers "accurate information about speaker numbers". In a 2021 review of Ethnologue and Glottolog, linguist Shobhana Chelliah noted that "For better or worse, the impact of the site is indeed considerable. [...] Clearly, the site has influence on the field of linguistics and beyond." She added that she, among other linguists, integrated Ethnologue in her linguistics classes."

The Encyclopedia of Language and Linguistics uses Ethnologue as its primary source for the list of languages and language maps. According to linguist Suzanne Romaine, Ethnologue is also the leading source for research on language diversity. According to The Oxford Handbook of Language and Society, Ethnologue is "the standard reference source for the listing and enumeration of Endangered Languages, and for all known and "living" languages of the world"." Similarly, linguist David Bradley describes Ethnologue as "the most comprehensive effort to document the level of endangerment in languages around the world." The US National Science Foundation uses Ethnologue to determine which languages are endangered. According to Hammarström et al., Ethnologue is, as of 2022, one of the three global databases documenting language endangerment with the Atlas of the World's Languages in Danger and the Catalogue of Endangered Languages (ELCat). The University of Hawaii Kaipuleohone language archive uses Ethnologue's metadata as well. The World Atlas of Language Structures uses Ethnologue's genealogical classification. The Rosetta Project uses Ethnologue's language metadata.

In 2005, linguist Harald Hammarström wrote that Ethnologue was consistent with specialist views most of the time and was a catalog "of very high absolute value and by far the best of its kind". In 2011, Hammarström created Glottolog in response to the lack of a comprehensive language bibliography, especially in Ethnologue. In 2015, Hammarström reviewed the 16th, 17th, and 18th editions of Ethnologue and described its frequent lack of citations as a "serious fault" from a scientific perspective. He concluded: "While hundreds of spurious and missing languages can be documented for Ethnologue, it is at present still better than any other nonderivative work of the same scope, in all aspects but one [citation]." Hammarström's review appendix detailed 198 post-1951 languages and 270 previously extinct languages not included in Ethnologue, as well as 180 examples of double-counted or "spurious" languages. According to Hammarström, as of 2016, Ethnologue and Glottolog are the only global-scale continually maintained inventories of the world's languages. The main difference is that Ethnologue includes additional information (such as speaker numbers or vitality) but lacks systematic sources for the information given. In contrast, Glottolog provides no language context information but points to primary sources for further data. Contrary to Ethnologue, Glottolog does not run its own surveys, but it uses Ethnologue as one of its primary sources. As of 2019, Hammarström uses Ethnologue in his articles, noting that it "has (unsourced, but) detailed information associated with each speech variety, such as speaker numbers and map location".

In 2013, responding to feedback about the lack of references, Ethnologue added a link on each language to language resources from the Open Language Archives Community (OLAC) Ethnologue acknowledges that it rarely quotes any source verbatim but cites sources wherever specific statements are directly attributed to them, and corrects missing attributions upon notification. The website provides a list of all of the references cited. In her 2021 review, Shobhana Chelliah noted that Glottolog aims to be better than Ethnologue in language classification and genetic and areal relationships by using linguists' original sources.

== Editions ==
Starting with the 17th edition, Ethnologue has been published every year, on February 21, which is International Mother Language Day.

Edition	Date	Editor	Notes
1	1951	Richard S. Pittman	10 mimeographed pages; 40 languages
2	1951	Pittman	
3	1952	Pittman	
4	1953	Pittman	first to include maps
5	1958	Pittman	first edition in book format
6	1965	Pittman	
7	1969	Pittman	4,493 languages
8	1974	Barbara Grimes	
9	1978	Grimes	
10	1984	Grimes	SIL codes first included
11	1988	Grimes	6,253 languages
12	1992	Grimes	6,662 languages
13	1996	Grimes	6,883 languages
14	2000	Grimes	6,809 languages
15	2005	Raymond G. Gordon Jr.	6,912 languages; draft ISO standard; first edition to provide color maps
16	2009	M. Paul Lewis	6,909 languages
17	2013, updated 2014	M. Paul Lewis, Gary F. Simons and Charles D. Fennig	7,106 living languages
18	2015	Lewis, Simons & Fennig	7,102 living languages; 7,472 total
19	2016	Lewis, Simons & Fennig	7,097 living languages
20	2017	Simons & Fennig	7,099 living languages
21	2018	Simons & Fennig	7,097 living languages
22	2019	Eberhard, David M., Simons & Fennig	7,111 living languages
23	2020	Eberhard, Simons & Fennig	7,117 living languages
24	2021	Eberhard, Simons & Fennig	7,139 living languages
25	2022	Eberhard, Simons & Fennig	7,151 living languages
26	2023	Eberhard, Simons & Fennig	7,168 living languages
27	2024	Eberhard, Simons & Fennig	7,164 living languages
28	2025	Eberhard, Simons & Fennig	7,159 living languages

== Bibliography ==
- Everaert, Martin; Musgrave, Simon; Dimitriadis, Alexis, eds. (March 26, 2009). The Use of Databases in Cross-Linguistic Studies. Walter de Gruyter. ISBN 9783110198744.
