= Gifts of Deceit =

1980 book by Robert Boettcher

- Book cover
- Author: Robert Boettcher
- Language: English
- Subject: Politics, South Korea United States relations, Unification movement
- Genre: non-fiction
- Publisher: Holt, Rinehart and Winston
- Publication date: 1980
- Publication place: United States
- Media type: Hardcover
- Pages: 402
- ISBN: 978-0-03-044576-7

Gifts of Deceit: Sun Myung Moon, Tongsun Park, and the Korean Scandal is a 1980 non-fiction book on Koreagate and the Fraser Committee, a congressional subcommittee which investigated South Korean influence in the United States by the KCIA and the Unification movement, written by Robert Boettcher, with Gordon L. Freedman. Freedman had served on the U.S. Senate Watergate Committee staff and had been a producer for ABC News 20/20 prior to his service on the subcommittee.

== About the author ==
Boettcher graduated with an M.S. in international relations from Georgetown University and served as a United States Foreign Service officer. Boettcher later was the staff director to the House Subcommittee on International Relations, which headed an investigation into Tongsun Park, Sun Myung Moon and the Unification movement. The subcommittee was chaired by Congressman Donald M. Fraser. Boettcher died in a fall in 1984.

== Cited by secondary works ==
Boettcher's work is cited extensively in Farrell's Tip O'Neill and the Democratic Century. The book itself was noted in United States Congressional investigations on "The Cult Phenomenon in the United States", in 1979. Gifts of Deceit is also cited in Breen's The Koreans: Who They Are, What They Want, Where Their Future Lies, Anderson's Inside the League, and is recommended reading by Olsen's Korea, the Divided Nation and Kim's Dictionary of Asian-American History.

In addition to political books, Gifts of Deceit is cited in books which analyze new religious movements, including Another Gospel, The Future of New Religious Movements, Crime, Values, and Religion, Spiritual Warfare, and more recently in Jenkins' Mystics and Messiahs, in 2000.

== Reception ==
In his work, The Ethics of Citizenship, James Stockdale recommends Gifts of Deceit and states that it is "very revealing", and deals with the "questionable conduct." The New Republic called it a "most complete account." The Washington Post reviewed the work, but stated that portions of the Koreagate Scandal may have been due to media hype.

== See also ==
- Koreagate
- Fraser Committee
- Tongsun Park
- Unification Church political activities
- Unification Church and North Korea
- Unification Church of the United States
