= Neil Albert Salonen =

Ninth president of the University of Bridgeport

Neil Albert Salonen (born 1946) served as the ninth president of the University of Bridgeport, a private university in Bridgeport, Connecticut from 1999 to 2018. He is a member of the Unification Church and became the president of the Unification Church of the United States in 1972. In 1974 he led the National Prayer and Fast Committee, a group founded by Unification Church leader Sun Myung Moon to support United States president Richard Nixon during the Watergate scandal. In 1976 Salonen met with Senator Bob Dole to defend the Unification Church against charges made by its critics, including parents of some members. In that year he was president of the Freedom Leadership Foundation, an anticommunist and pro South Korean propaganda organization, as well as church president.

In 1980 Salonen was succeeded as the president of the American church by Mose Durst. In 1997 he served as master of ceremonies at a blessing ceremony for about 20,000 engaged and married couples presided over by Rev. and Mrs. Moon and held in Robert F. Kennedy Memorial Stadium in Washington D.C. In 2002, Salonen was selected to serve on the Presidents Leadership Group, "a body of higher education presidents and chancellors who have declared their commitment to student substance abuse prevention."
