= United States v. Sun Myung Moon =

American legal case

In 1984, Sun Myung Moon, the founder and leader of the Unification Church, was charged with willfully filing false federal income tax returns and conspiracy. Church members and supporters stated that the prosecution was politically motivated, discriminatory, and unfair.

Moon served 13 months of a 18-month sentence in federal prison in the United States after being found guilty by a jury.

== Trial and appeal ==
On October 15, 1981, Moon was indicted by a federal grand jury and charged with three counts of willfully filing false federal income tax returns (for the years 1973, 1974, and 1975) under 26 U.S.C. § 7206, and one count of conspiracy—under 18 U.S.C. § 371—to file false income tax returns, to obstruct justice, to make false statements to government officials, and to make false statements to a grand jury. The prosecutors charged that Moon failed to declare as income (and pay taxes on) $112,000 in earned interest in a Chase Manhattan bank account, and on the receipt of $50,000 of corporate stock.

The essence of the prosecution's case was that both the money and stock were his personal property. The defense maintained that these were rather being held on behalf of the fledgling church, which had not yet incorporated. Moon transferred the bulk of the Chase account funds to the fledgling church upon its incorporation. He did not declare this transfer as a deduction on his income tax.

Holding church funds in a minister's name is fairly common, particularly in small churches, and some church-related or other organizations filed amicus curiae briefs in the case, including the Center for Law and Religious Freedom, the American Civil Liberties Union, the New York Civil Liberties Union, American Baptist Churches in the USA, the National Council of Churches, the National Black Catholic Clergy Caucus, the Southern Christian Leadership Conference, the National Conference of Black Mayors, and the National Bar Association.

The court denied Moon's request to have a bench trial. In 1982 he was convicted on all counts and the convictions were upheld on appeal. Moon was represented in his appeal by Laurence Tribe, noted constitutional lawyer and law professor.

== Sentence ==
Moon was given an 18-month sentence and a $15,000 fine. He served 13 months of the sentence at the Federal Correctional Institution, Danbury and because of good behavior was released to a halfway house before returning home. While serving his sentence he worked in the prison kitchen.

Takeru Kamiyama, Moon's aide and codefendant in the trial, was convicted of conspiracy, obstruction of justice and perjury and was sentenced to six months imprisonment which he served at Danbury along with Moon.

Kenneth Briggs, former religion editor of the New York Times, wrote:

Later, the group's founder, the Rev. Sun-Myung Moon, was jailed on questionable allegations, and he took his punishment in a Connecticut prison with exemplary forbearance.

== Commentary and protests ==
While Moon was in prison, members of the Unification Church of the United States launched a public-relations campaign. Booklets, letters and videotapes were mailed to approximately 300,000 Christian leaders in the United States. Many signed petitions protesting the government's case. Among the American Christian leaders who spoke out in defense of Moon were conservative Jerry Falwell, head of Moral Majority, and liberal Joseph Lowery, head of the Southern Christian Leadership Conference. Among the other people who protested the government's prosecution of Moon were Harvey Cox, a Professor of Divinity at Harvard and Eugene McCarthy, United States Senator and former Democratic Party presidential candidate.

Supporters regard the tax case as politically motivated. The prosecutors offered to drop the case in return for Moon surrendering his green card, which he chose not to do.

A United States Senate subcommittee, chaired by Senator Orrin Hatch, conducted its own investigation into Moon's tax case and published its findings in a report which concluded:

"We accused a newcomer to our shores of criminal and intentional wrongdoing for conduct commonly engaged in by a large percentage of our own religious leaders, namely, the holding of church funds in bank accounts in their own names. Catholic priests do it. Baptist ministers do it, and so did Sun Myung Moon.

No matter how we view it, it remains a fact that we charged a non-English-speaking alien with criminal tax evasion on the first tax returns he filed in this country. It appears that we didn't give him a fair chance to understand our laws. We didn't seek a civil penalty as an initial means of redress. We didn't give him the benefit of any doubt. Rather, we took a novel theory of tax liability of less than $10,000 and turned it into a guilty verdict and eighteen months in a federal prison.

I do feel strongly, after my subcommittee has carefully and objectively reviewed this case from both sides, that injustice rather than justice has been served. The Moon case sends a strong signal that if one's views are unpopular enough, this country will find a way not to tolerate, but to convict. I don't believe that you or I or anyone else, no matter how innocent, could realistically prevail against the combined forces of our Justice Department and judicial branch in a case such as Reverend Moon's."

Jeremiah S. Gutman, president of the New York Civil Liberties Union, called the prosecution "an indefensible intrusion in private religious affairs." The New York Times and The Washington Post, which had both been critical of Moon, expressed concern about the government's prosecution of him and the consequences it might have for other religious groups.

Michael Tori, a professor at Marist College (Poughkeepsie, New York) suggested that Moon's conviction helped the Unification Church gain more acceptance in mainstream American society, since it showed that he was financially accountable to the government and the public.

In 1991 Pulitzer-prize winning reporter Carlton Sherwood wrote a book in Moon's defense, Inquisition: The Persecution and Prosecution of the Reverend Sun Myung Moon. Sherwood mentions opposition to Moon by the news media, major Christian denominations, and members of the government including Representative Donald Fraser and Senator Bob Dole. Sherwood characterizes this opposition as unfair, dishonest, and mean-spirited. He concludes that the federal prosecution of Moon on tax charges was unjust, citing the court's refusal to allow Moon's fellow defendant Takeru Kamiyama to provide his own translator, its refusal to allow the two men a bench trial rather than a jury trial, possible tainting of the jury, and the unusual length of Moon's sentence, 18 months, for a tax case. He also mentions that Moon could have avoided the trial if he had remained outside of the United States.

Sherwood sums up his views by writing:

The Unification Church, its leaders and followers were and continue to be the victims of the worst kind of religious prejudice and racial bigotry this country has witnessed in over a century. Moreover, virtually every institution we as Americans hold sacred the Congress, the courts, law enforcement agencies, the press, even the US Constitution itself was prostituted in a malicious, oftentimes brutal manner, as part of a determined effort to wipe out this small but expanding religious movement.
