= Kim Hyong-uk =

South Korean politician (1925–1979)

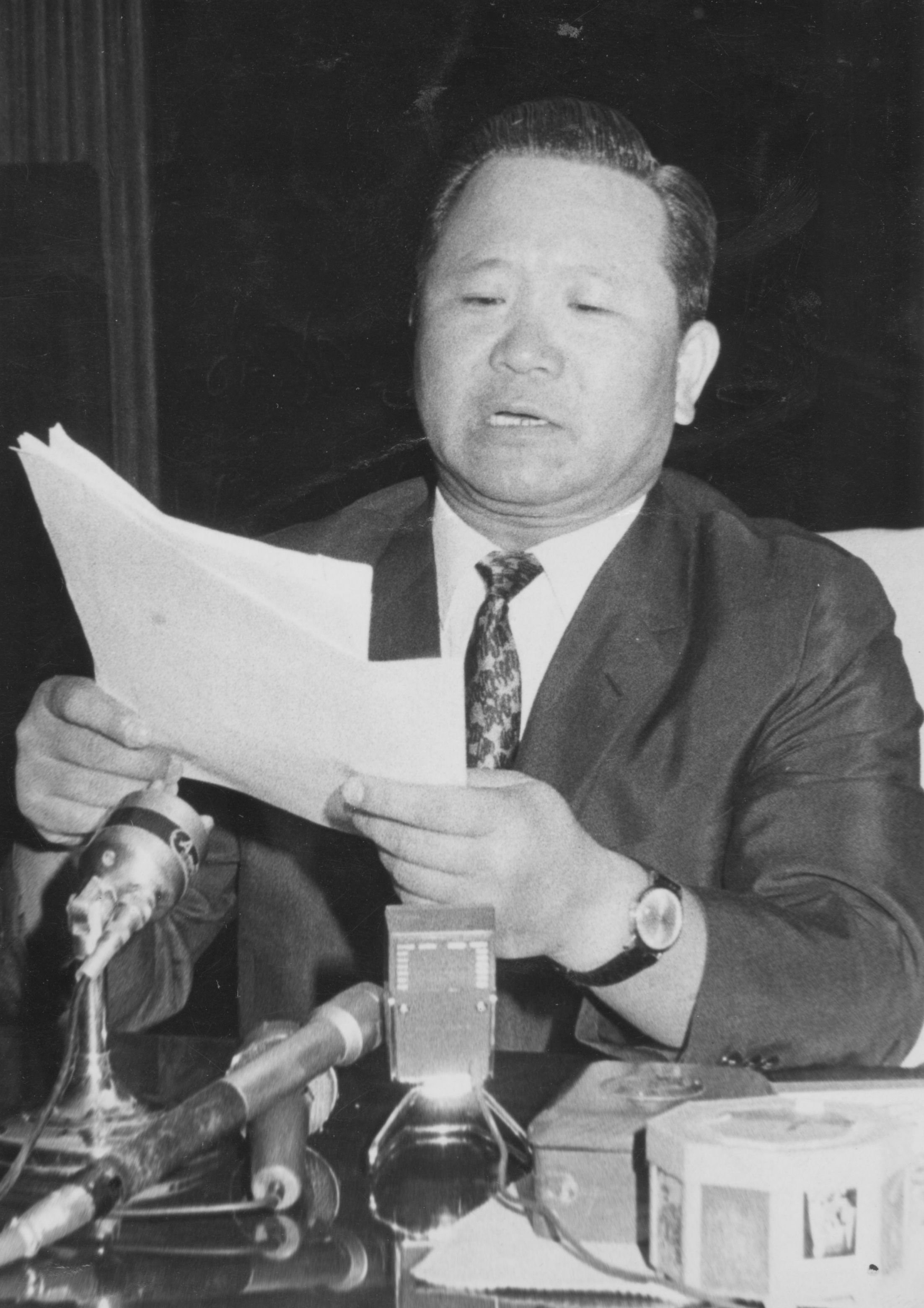
- Kim in 1968

Personal details
- Born: January 16, 1925 Kōkai Province, Korea, Empire of Japan
- Died: October 8, 1979 (aged 54)
- Education: Korea Military Academy

Military service
- Allegiance: South Korea
- Branch/service: Republic of Korea Army
- Rank: Brigadier general

Korean name
- Hangul: 김형욱
- Hanja: 金炯旭
- RR: Gim Hyeonguk
- MR: Kim Hyŏnguk

Kim Hyong-uk (Korean: 김형욱, January 16, 1925 – c. October 8, 1979) was a South Korean brigadier general who served as director of the Korean Central Intelligence Agency from 1963 to 1969.

== Early life ==
Born in Hwanghae province, he left for the South after high school and was a classmate of Kim Jong-pil at the Korea Military Academy, graduating in 1949 as members of the 8th graduating class. He was an infantry troop commander in the Korean War. He attended the United States Army Infantry School at Fort Benning, Georgia, in 1955.

== Career ==
As colonel, he took part in the May 16 coup in 1961, when he led a group of soldiers to take Prime Minister John M. Chang into custody. He served for two years as Minister for Home Affairs in the junta and then was director of the KCIA from March 1963 to October 1969, where he was notorious for his brutality and corruption. His nicknames are Flying Pork Cutlet (or Flying Tonkatsu) (날으는 돈가스; Nareuneun Dongaseu), Pork Belly of Fear (공포의 삼겹살; Gongpoui Samgyeopsal), and Namsan Wild Boar (남산 멧돼지; Namsan metdwaeji).

After refusing to support Park's bid for a third term, he was replaced as head of the KCIA by Kim Gye-won. Reportedly, at a meeting with Park, the President asked him, "why don't you take a rest after your long service?"—and on returning to his office, he discovered it had already been cleared out. In 1971, he became a member of the powerless parliament. Kim went into exile in the United States in 1973.

On June 22, 1977, he testified to the Fraser committee about the Koreagate scandal and the activities of Tongsun Park. He also claimed that the Japanese police had had foreknowledge of the kidnapping of Kim Dae-jung. Park had offered him $1 million not to testify, which Kim refused. Kim accepted $500,000 not to publish his memoirs, but reneged on the deal and published them in Japan in April 1979.

== Death ==
He disappeared on October 7, 1979, after last being seen in a casino of Paris, France. A popular rumor is that Kim was smuggled back to Seoul and personally shot by Park in the basement of the Blue House. (Note: This version was shown in part 12 of the North Korean film series Nation and Destiny.)

In February 2005, the Monthly Chosun published claims that Kim had been lured from New Jersey to Paris by a hired female entertainer and then been kidnapped by a French criminal syndicate in pay of the South Korean government, then murdered and ground up in a hammermill which is a grinder at a chicken farm and turned into chicken feed by agents of the KCIA. (Note: This version was shown in the film The Man Standing Next.)

In May 2005, a report from the National Intelligence Service's Truth Commission concluded that Kim had been killed on the orders of Kim Jae-gyu, his successor as director of the KCIA. He was reportedly shot with a silenced pistol and his body was dumped in the woods outside Paris.

Three weeks after Kim Hyong-uk's disappearance, Kim Jae-kyu assassinated Park.

== Cultural references ==
His memoirs were published in South Korea in 1985.

=== Film ===
- The Man Standing Next (2020)
- Nation and Destiny (1992)
- Vanished (증발; 蒸發; Jeungbal) (1994)

=== Television ===
- History Journal that Day (역사저널 그날; Yeoksajeoneol geunal) (2020)
- Kkokkomu 2 (꼬리에 꼬리를 무는 그날 이야기 2; Kkorie kkorireul muneun geunal iyagi 2) - Episode 12 (2021)
- PD Note - On-site verification! Kim Hyong-uk's assassination of the poultry farm (2005)
- Unanswered Questions (그것이 알고싶다; Geugeosi algosipda) - Episode 543 (2005)

==== TV series ====
- 4th Republic (제4공화국; 第4共和國; Jesagonghwaguk) (1995–96)
- Koreagate (코리아게이트; Koriageiteu) (1995)
