= Stolen Honor (disambiguation) =

Stolen honor can mean

- Stolen Honor, a 2004 film about John Kerry
- Military impostor, someone who falsely claims military service
