= Deborah R. Brock =

Canadian sociologist

Deborah Brock is a professor specializing in the areas social, moral, and sexual regulation. Brock has taught sociology and women's studies at Ryerson Polytechnic University, Wilfrid Laurier University, and Trent University. She completed her M.A. at Carleton University in 1984 and her Ph.D. at the University of Toronto in 1990. She is currently an associate professor (Arts) at York University and she teaches Crime and Criminological Theory; Social Regulation; Gender and Sexualities; Historical Sociology.

== Overview of research ==
Brock has written mostly about prostitution in Canada. She sees prostitution as an occupation rather than a crime because women are using their bodies as commodities. However, she explains how the laws against bawdy houses make sure that prostitution goes back to the streets where it has been criminalized. It is on the streets where prostitutes are seen as immoral and are prosecuted. If sex workers were able to do their work in a secure, less criminalized area they would not be visible and therefore would not be seen as immoral and in turn prosecuted much less. She does definitely make the distinction between adult sex work and that of juvenile sex work because adults can consent to the activity and many use it as a source of employment however most of the time juveniles are exploited by older people in a position of power. Brock explains that societies panic surrounding sex and morality has enabled Canada to still criminalized sex work and prostitution.

== Major works ==
Brock, Deborah. 1998. Making Work, Making Trouble: Prostitution as a Social Problem. Toronto: University of Toronto Press.

Making work making trouble looks at how prostitution was made to be a social problem and a moral panic. Brock wonders why sex work is seen as a problem and for whom is it a problem. Chapter two focuses on how the murder of a young boy started a moral panic and the media made prostitution seem as though it was a big social problem. The government then got into it and started to shut places down and arrest people. Prostitution was used as a scapegoat for the young boy's death. Chapter three focuses on the problems with how to regulate street prostitution because of the definitions of who is a prostitute, what is a public place, what is solicitation, etc. The media and different groups start to make a big deal out of a small issues and soon everybody wants more police and more jails which leads to more criminal records which forces women to sell their bodies because they cannot get another job. Basically moral and discriminatory bias is punishing the most disadvantaged women - those who work the streets- while doing nothing to understand why they are there in the first place. Chapter four looks at the creation of the special committee on pornography and Prostitution (The Fraser Committee), its mandates, its goals and its recommendations. Chapter five looks at bill C-49 which attempted to restrict the communication for the purpose of prostitution. Restricting the communication for the purpose of prostitution did not work to get the sex workers of the street even though there were a huge number of arrest. Chapter five also looks at how the rights of the upper and the middle class take priority over the rights of the sex workers in the way that the middle and upper class feel threatened and uncomfortable with the prostitutes but the rights of the prostitutes are not taken into account. Chapter six looks at the report of the Committee on Sexual offences against children and Youth (The Badgley Report) and its recommendations. Its purpose was to "enquire into the incidence and prevalence in Canada of sexual offences against children and youth and to recommend improvements in laws for the protection of young persons from sexual abuse and exploitation"(Brock, 1998, p. 102). Chapter seven focuses on how the Badgley report built on a social problem of youth prostitution and victimization but it did not look at why the youth engaged in prostitution in the first place. The media and therefore the public saw youth prostitution as a new social problem but it has been happening for years. Chapter seven also looks at the legislation put in place to "protect" youth in prostitution and other resources that attempt to help youth prostitutes and/or runaways. Finally Chapter eight explains that criminalizing prostitution is not going to make it stop. Proving safe places for prostitution to take place would better serve everybody affected. Many prostitutes are murdered each year by their customers and many youth turn to survival sex, a form of prostitution. Women in the sex trade need more tools and support to protect themselves. The legislation and moral panic will not stop the sex trade despite what lawmakers may think.

Brock, Deborah. 2000. "Victim, Nuisance, Fallen Woman, Outlaw, Worker?: Making the Identity, Prostitute in Canadian Criminal Law." In D. Chunn and D. Lacombe (Ed.) Law as a Gendering Practice. Ontario.: Oxford University Press.

In this chapter Deborah Brock looks at how some people see prostitution as women who are victimized by patriarchy, others see prostitution as women who will not be confined by the moral rules of sexuality. Other people see prostitutes as workers, some of which work is less favorable conditions than others but they are still workers. She examines how prostitution is often seen as symbolic of patriarchal oppression however many women use their bodies as a source of income. Sex workers are not able to participate in the discussions about the issues that directly affect them. They do not have a voice in the legislation being put forth to regulate their jobs and they do not have a say in the solutions that could decrease prostitution. She examines how laws have been in place to govern sex work since 1839 and is either seen as a public nuisance or a morality problem. The law continues to distinguish between good women and bad women and sex workers are often the scapegoat for other incidents or problems in the area.

== Contributions to feminist criminology ==
Deborah Brock has contributed to feminist criminology through her work in understanding the root causes of prostitution and sex work. She contributes by explaining that prostitution, for the most part, is a choice made by the women as a way of supporting themselves. Sex work is sometimes the only option for women to support themselves because they are, many times, only given access to jobs that provide very low wages, are in the services sector and have little chance of advancement (Brock, 1998, p. 14-15). She notes that prostitution is seen as immoral however it is the oldest occupation in the world. She attempts to understand why prostitutes are labeled by their job rather than by who they really are. She tries to demystify why some women must turn to prostitution in order to support themselves. She also explains that the laws to stop prostitution do not work and mainly come from the moral panic that the media creates (Brock, 1998, p. 138). Her major contribution of feminist criminology is in how moral panics about prostitution create laws that do not work in fixing the problem.

== Bibliography ==
- Brock, Deborah. 2000. "Victim, Nuisance, Fallen Woman, Outlaw, Worker?: Making the Identity, Prostitute in Canadian Criminal Law." In D. Chunn and D. Lacombe (Ed.) Law as a Gendering Practice. Ontario.: Oxford University Press.
- Brock, Deborah, Mook Sutdhibhasilip, Kara Gillies, and Chantelle Oliver. 2000. "Migrant Sex Work: A Roundtable Analysis." Canadian Woman Studies 20(2): 84–91.
- Brock, Deborah. 1998. Making Work, Making Trouble: Prostitution as a Social Problem. Toronto: University of Toronto Press.
- Brock, Deborah. Workers of the World Caress: An Interview with Gary Kinsman on Lesbian and Gay Organizing in the 1970s Toronto Left. Left History (Spring/Summer 2004) 9:2. Available online at www.yorku.ca/lefthist/ Brock, Deborah. From Liberation to Rights: The Politics of Responsibility: An Interview with Gary Kinsman. Left History (Spring/Summer 2004) 9:2. Available online at www.yorku.ca/lefthist/
- Brock, Deborah. 1990. Regulating prostitution/policing prostitutes some Canadian examples. 1970–1989. Ottawa : National Library of Canada
- Brock, Deborah (Ed.). 2003. Making Normal: Social Regulation in Canada. Toronto: Nelson
- Brock, Deborah. 1986. Feminist perspectives on prostitution addressing the Canadian dilemma. Ottawa: National Library of Canada

== External resources ==
- Brock, Deborah (1998). Making Work, Making Trouble: Prostitution as a Social Problem. Toronto: University of Toronto Press.
- Brock, Deborah (2000). "Victim, Nuisance, Fallen Woman, Outlaw, Worker?: Making the Identity, Prostitute in Canadian Criminal Law". In D. Chunn and D. Lacombe (ed.). Law as a Gendering Practice. Ontario: Oxford University Press.
- "Review of "Making Work, Making Trouble"". The Globe and Mail.
