= Unification Church of the United States =

New religious movement

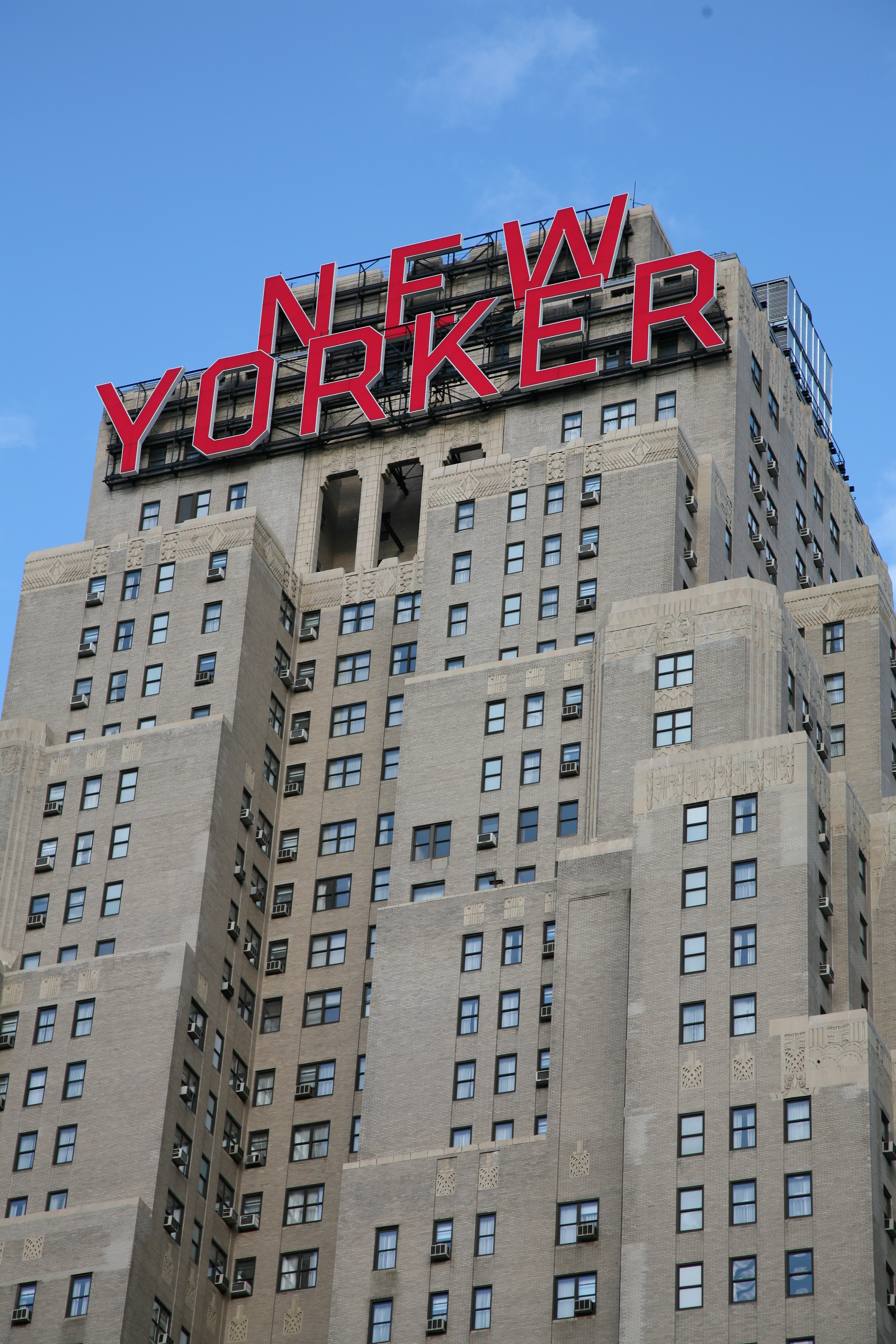
The New Yorker Hotel in Manhattan, purchased by the Unification Church of the United States in 1976 and now the site of national church headquarters offices

The Unification Church of the United States is the branch of the Unification Church in the United States. It began in the late 1950s and early 1960s when missionaries from South Korea were sent to America by the international Unification Church's founder and leader Sun Myung Moon. It expanded in the 1970s and then became involved in controversy due to its theology, its political activism, and the lifestyle of its members. Since then, it has been involved in many areas of American society and has established businesses, news media, projects in education and the arts, as well as taking part in political and social activism, and has itself gone through substantial changes.

== History in the United States ==
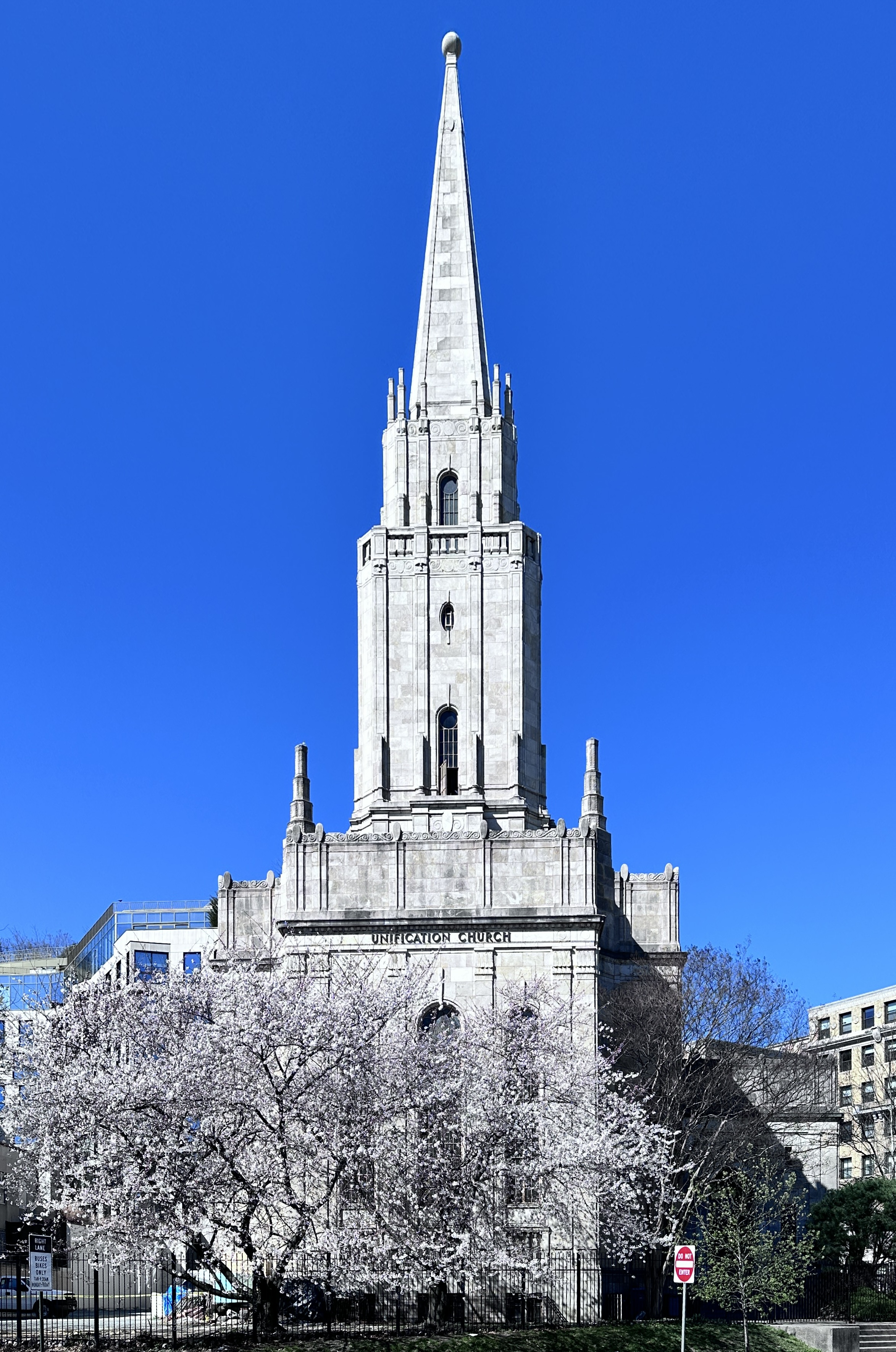
The Washington Family Church National Cathedral was purchased from the Church of Jesus Christ of Latter-day Saints in the 1970s.

In the late 1950s and early 1960s, missionaries from the Unification Church of South Korea came to the United States. Among them were Young Oon Kim, Sang Ik-Choi, Bo Hi Pak, David S. C. Kim, and Yun Soo Lim. Missionary work took place in seven Mid-Atlantic states (including New York, Pennsylvania, and New Jersey), and Washington D.C., three Midwestern states (including Illinois, Wisconsin, and Michigan), and three West Coast states (including California, Oregon, and Washington). In 1965, Moon visited the United States and established what he called "holy grounds" in each of the 48 contiguous states.

The Unification Church first came to public notice in the United States after sociology student John Lofland studied Young Oon Kim's group and published his findings as a doctoral thesis entitled: The World Savers: A Field Study of Cult Processes, which was published in 1966 in book form by Prentice-Hall as Doomsday Cult: A Study of Conversion, Proselytization, and Maintenance of Faith. This book is considered to be one of the most important and widely cited studies of the process of religious conversion, and one of the first modern sociological studies of a new religious movement.

By 1971, the Unification Church of the United States had about 500 members. By the end of the 1970s it had expanded to about 5,000 members, with most of them being in their early 20s. In the 1980s and 1990s membership remained at about the same number. Scholars have attributed the Unification Church's relative success in the United States, as compared to other Western nations, to its support of patriotism, international, and capitalist values, and to its multi-racial membership. Some commentators have also noted that this period of Unification Church growth in the United States took place just as the "hippie" era of the late 1960s and early 1970s was ending, when many American young people were looking for a sense of higher purpose or community in their lives. Among the converts were many who had been active in leftist causes.

In 1971, Moon decided to move to the United States. He then asked the American Unification Church members to help him in a series of outreach campaigns in which he spoke to public audiences in all 50 states, ending with a 1976 rally in Washington, D.C., in which he spoke on the grounds of the Washington Monument to around 300,000 people. During this time many Unification Church members left school and careers to devote their full-time to church work. "Mobile fundraising teams" (often called MFT) were set up to raise money for church projects, sometimes giving candy or flowers in exchange for donations. Members considered fund raising to be a source of both spiritual and practical training for future activities.

Moon also brought Unification Church members from Europe to work in the U.S. Church buildings were purchased around the nation, including the Belvedere Estate, the Unification Theological Seminary, and the New Yorker Hotel in New York state. The national headquarters of the Unification Church was established in the New Yorker Hotel in New York City. In Washington, D.C., the Unification Church purchased a church building from the Church of Jesus Christ of Latter-day Saints. In Seattle, it purchased the historic Rolland Denny mansion.

== Political involvement ==
Moon had long been an advocate for anti-communism. He was born in what is now North Korea and had been imprisoned by the North Korean communist government during the Korean War, and believed that the defeat of communism by democracy was a necessary step in the Divine Providence to establish the Kingdom of God on earth.

In 1974, Moon asked Unification Church members to support President Richard Nixon during the Watergate scandal when Nixon was being pressured to resign his office. Unification Church members prayed and fasted in support of Nixon for three days in front of the United States Capitol, under the motto: "Forgive, Love and Unite." On February 1, 1974, Nixon publicly thanked them for their support and officially received Moon. This brought the Unification Church into widespread public and media attention.

The Unification Church of the United States sponsored other anti-communist activities during the 1970s and 1980s, including the multi-national organization CAUSA International.

=== The Washington Times ===
In 1982, Moon founded The Washington Times, a daily conservative newspaper in Washington, D.C., as part of News World Communications, an international news media conglomerate which also publishes newspapers in South Korea, Japan, and South America. Although never a financial success, The Washington Times was well-read in conservative and anti-communist circles and was credited by President Ronald Reagan, who acknowledged reading the paper daily, with helping to win the Cold War.

=== Protesting Soviet downing of KAL 007 ===
In 1983, Unification Church members publicly protested against the Soviet Union over its shooting down of Korean Airlines Flight 007. In 1984, church member Dan Fefferman founded the International Coalition for Religious Freedom in Virginia, which is active in protesting what it considers to be threats to religious freedom by governmental agencies. In 1986 conservative author William Rusher wrote: "The members the Reverend Sun Myung Moon's Unification Church, now almost universally referred to as 'Moonies,' constitute a fascinating problem for outsiders—and perhaps above all for conservatives, because they are so unabashedly anti-Communist and pro-American."

== "Moonie" expression ==
The word "Moonie" was first used by the American news media in the 1970s when Sun Myung Moon moved to the United States and came to public notice. In the 1970s and early 1980s, the word "Moonie" was used by Unification Church members both within the movement and in public as a self-designation, and "as a badge of honor". Unification Church members could be seen on the New York City Subway wearing T-shirts that read: "I'm a Moonie and I love it". Religious scholar Anson Shupe notes that "on many occasions", he heard "David Kim, President of the Unification Theological Seminary, refer to 'Moonie theology', the 'Moonie lifestyle', and so forth matter-of-factly". The principal aide to Moon, Bo Hi Pak, was quoted by Carlton Sherwood in his book Inquisition: The Persecution and Prosecution of the Reverend Sun Myung Moon as declaring to the United States Congress: "I am a proud Korean – a proud 'Moonie' – and a dedicated anti-Communist and I intend to remain so the rest of my life." Moon himself declared: "In two and a half years the word 'Moonie' shall become an honorable name and we will have demonstrations and victory celebrations from coast to coast."

In the 1995 book America's Alternative Religions, published by the State University of New York Press, Baker wrote: "Although they prefer to be called Unificationists, they are referred to in the media and popularly known as 'Moonies'." In the same book, sociologists Anson Shupe and David Bromley, both noted for their studies of new religious movements, also use the word "Moonies" to refer to members of the Unification Church. In his 1998 book Religion, Mobilization, and Social Action, Shupe notes that Barker, Bromley, and he himself had used the term in other publications, "and meant no offense".

In a 1996 article for The Independent about a talk former Prime Minister Edward Heath gave at a Unification Church sponsored conference, Andrew Brown commented: "The term 'Moonie' has entered the language as meaning a brainwashed, bright-eyed zombie." Brown also quoted William Shaw, a broadcaster who was presenting the Cult Fiction series on BBC Radio 5 Live: "Most Moonies embrace a morality which would make them acceptable in the most genteel Anglican social circle."

In his 2000 book Mystics and Messiahs, Philip Jenkins likens the term to "smear words such as Shaker, Methodist, Mormon". Jenkins mentions use of the word in book titles including Life among the Moonies and Escape from the Moonies, and comments: "These titles further illustrate how the derogatory term 'Moonie' became a standard for members of this denomination, in a way that would have been inconceivable for any of the insulting epithets that could be applied to, say, Catholics or Jews."

=== Criticisms of Moonie expression ===
In 1984, The Washington Post noted, "Members of the Unification Church resent references to them as 'Moonies'", and quoted one church member who said, "Even in quotation marks, it's derogatory". In 1985, the president of the Unification Church of the United States, Mose Durst, said: "In one year, we moved from being a pariah to being part of the mainstream. People recognized that Reverend Moon was abused for his religious beliefs and they rallied around. You rarely hear the word 'Moonie' anymore. We're 'Unificationists.'" In 1987, civil rights activist Ralph Abernathy, who was also the vice president of the Unification Church affiliated American Freedom Coalition and served on boards of directors for two other related organizations, equated the word "Moonie" with the word "nigger".

In 1989, the San Francisco Chronicle reported that Unification Church members preferred to be called "Unificationists." The Washington Post reported that "Unification Church members are being advised no longer to accept the designation of 'Moonie,' and to declare any such nomenclature as indicative of a prejudiced view of the church." In 1989, the Chicago Tribune was picketed after referring to members as Moonies. Moon directed minister and civil rights leader James Bevel to form a protest by religious officials against the Chicago Tribune because of the newspaper's use of the word. Bevel handed out fliers at the protest which said: "Are the Moonies our new niggers?"

In 1990, a position paper sent from the Unification Church to The Fresno Bee said: "We will fight gratuitous use of the 'Moonie' or 'cult' pejoratives. We will call journalists on every instance of unprofessional reporting. We intend to stop distortions plagiarized from file clippings which propagate from story to story like a computer virus." In 1992, Michael Jenkins (who later became president of the Unification Church of the United States) commented: "Why, after so many years, should we now be taking such a stand to eliminate the term 'Moonie?' For me, it is a sign that the American Unification Church has come of age. We can no longer allow our founder, our members, and allies to be dehumanized and unfairly discriminated against. ... We are now entering a period of our history where our Church development and family orientation are strong enough that we can turn our attention toward ending the widespread misunderstanding about our founder and the Unification movement."

In 1992, Unification movement member Kristopher Esplin told Reuters what is normally done if the word is seen in media sources: "If it's printed in newspapers, we will respond, write to the editor, that sort of thing." On an October 6, 1994 broadcast of Nightline, host Ted Koppel stated: "On last night's program ...I used the term 'Moonies'. This is a label which members of the Reverend Sun Myung Moon's Unification Church find demeaning and offensive, and I'd like to apologize for its use."

In its entry on "Unification Church", the 2002 edition of The New York Times Manual of Style and Usage advised: "Unification Church is appropriate in all references to the Holy Spirit Association for the Unification of World Christianity, which was founded by the Rev. Sun Myung Moon. Do not use the disparaging Moonie(s)". Reuters, in its handbook for journalists, says: "'Moonie' is a pejorative term for members of the Unification Church. We should not use it in copy and avoid it when possible in direct quotations."

In 2010, National Public Radio, in a story on Unification Church "second generation" members, reported that they "bristle at the term 'Moonie'", while USA Today reported on "the folks who follow Rev. Sun Myung Moon (also known, to their dislike, as the Moonies)."

== Criticism and debate ==
The Unification Church of the United States faced widespread criticism beginning in the early 1970s. The main points of criticism were the Unification Church's unorthodox theology, especially the belief that Moon is the second coming of Jesus; the church's political involvement; and the extreme lifestyle of most members, which involved full-time dedication to church activities often at the neglect of family, school, and career. During this time, hundreds of parents of members used the services of deprogrammers to remove their children from church membership, and the activities of the church were widely reported in the media, most often in a negative light.

In 1975, Steven Hassan, who had held a leadership position in the Unification Church in the United States, left it and later became an outspoken critic. He is the author of two books on his experiences and on his theories concerning cults and brainwashing. The political activities of the church were opposed by some leftists. In 1976 members of the Youth International Party (Yippies) staged a cannabis "smoke-in" in the middle of a Unification Church sponsored rally in Washington, D.C.

In 1976, Unification Church president Neil Albert Salonen met with Senator Bob Dole to defend the Unification Church against charges made by its critics, including parents of some members. In 1977, Unification Church member Jonathan Wells, who later became well known as the author of the popular Intelligent Design book Icons of Evolution, defended Unification Church theology against what he said were unfair criticisms by the National Council of Churches.

That same year Frederick Sontag, a professor of philosophy at Pomona College and a minister in the United Church of Christ, published Sun Myung Moon and the Unification Church, which gave an overview of the Unification Church and urged Christians to take it more seriously. In an interview with UPI, Sontag compared the Unification Church with the Church of Jesus Christ of Latter-day Saints and said that he expected its practices to conform more to mainstream American society as its members become more mature. He added that he did not want to be considered an apologist for the Unification Church, but a close look at its theology is important: "They raise some incredibly interesting issues."

In 1978 and 1979, the Unification Church's support for the South Korean government was investigated by a Congressional subcommittee led by Democratic Representative Donald M. Fraser of Minnesota. (see also: Koreagate, Fraser Committee) In 1982 the United States Supreme Court struck down a Minnesota law which had imposed registration and reporting requirements on those religions that receive more than half of their contributions from nonmembers as being contrary to the First Amendment of the United States Constitution's protection of religious freedom and prohibition of state establishment of religion. The law was seen as especially targeting the Unification Church.

In 1982, Moon was convicted in United States federal court of willfully filing false Federal income tax returns and conspiracy. In 1984 and 1985, while he was serving his sentence in Federal Correctional Institution, Danbury, Connecticut, American Unification Church members launched a public-relations campaign claiming that the charges against him were unjust and politically motivated. Booklets, letters, and videotapes were mailed to approximately 300,000 Christian leaders. Many signed petitions protesting the government's case.

Among the American Christian leaders who spoke out in defense of Moon were conservative Jerry Falwell, head of Moral Majority, and liberal Joseph Lowery, head of the Southern Christian Leadership Conference. Michael Tori, a professor at Marist College (Poughkeepsie, New York) suggested that Moon's conviction helped the Unification Church gain more acceptance in mainstream American society, since it showed that he was financially accountable to the government and the public.

== Changes 1982 through 1990s ==
On July 1, 1982, a large number of the members of the Unification Church of the United States were married by Rev. and Mrs. Moon in a Blessing ceremony (sometimes called a "mass wedding") in Madison Square Garden in New York City. The total number of people who took part was 2,075, some coming from the other countries. Soon after other American members were married in ceremonies in South Korea. Most who took part were matched with their future spouses by Moon. Many couples were international or interracial. Before this most American church members had been single and living celibately.

Moon's practice of matching couples was very unusual in both Christian tradition and in modern Western culture and attracted much attention and controversy. Thousands of couples have been placed in marriages by religious leaders with people they had barely met, since Moon taught that romantic love led to sexual promiscuity. Their mass arranged marriage events have gained international public attention. Critics have stated that some of these marriages end in divorce, which is discouraged by the Unification Church.

Also in the 1980s, Moon instructed Unification Church members to take part in a program called "Home Church" in which they reached out to neighbors and community members through public service. Unification Church business interests, which had begun in the 1960s, expanded in the 1980s, 1990s, and 2000s. Church-owned businesses in the United States include media and entertainment, fishing and sea food distribution, hotels and real estate, and many others. Many church members found employment in church-owned businesses while others pursued careers outside of the church community. Also expanding were church sponsored interdenominational and cultural projects.

In 1984, Eileen Barker, a British sociologist specializing in religious topics, published The Making of a Moonie which disputed much of the negative characterization of Unification Church members by the news media.

In 1991, Inquisition: The Persecution and Prosecution of the Reverend Sun Myung Moon by investigative journalist Carlton Sherwood criticized the federal government's prosecution of Moon in the 1980s.

After the dissolution of the Soviet Union in 1991, Moon made anti-communism much less of a priority for Unification Church members. In that year Moon announced that members should return to their hometowns in order to undertake apostolic work there. Massimo Introvigne, who has studied the Unification Church and other new religious movements, has said that this confirms that full-time membership is no longer considered crucial to church members. In 1997 Dr. Sontag commented: "There's no question their numbers are way down. The older members complain to me that they have a lot of captains but no foot soldiers." While Barker reported that Unificationists had undergone a transformation in their world view from millennialism to utopianism.

On May 1, 1994, the 40th anniversary of the founding of the Holy Spirit Association for the Unification of World Christianity (HSA-UWC) in Seoul, South Korea, Moon declared that the era of the HSA-UWC had ended and inaugurated a new organization: the Family Federation for World Peace and Unification (FFWPU). The FFWPU included members of various religious organizations working toward common goals, especially on issues of sexual morality and reconciliation between people of different religions, nations, and races.

== 21st century ==
In 2000, the FFWPU co-sponsored the Million Family March, the Global Peace Festival in 2009, and blessing ceremonies in which thousands of married couples of different faith backgrounds were given the marriage blessing previously given only to Unification Church members.

In 2001, the United States Army, in a handbook for chaplains, reported that "the Unification Church emphasizes the responsibility of citizenship but sets no official rules as to military service." It added that members have no restrictions on diet, uniform appearance, medical treatment, or other factors which might conflict with military requirements.

In 2009, Sun Myung Moon's daughter In Jin Moon became president of the Unification Church of the United States. She worked to modernize the church's worship style in an effort to involve younger members.

Following Sun Myung Moon's death in 2012, his widow Hak Ja Han took leadership responsibility for the international Unification Church, including its activities in the United States. In 2013, the Global Peace Foundation, which had been founded in 2009 by Moon and Han's son Hyun Jin Moon and church leader Chung Hwan Kwak, distanced itself from the mainstream Unification Church. In 2017, they also founded the Family Peace Association. In 2014, Moon and Han's younger sons Hyung Jin Moon and Kook-jin Moon founded the Rod of Iron Ministries, also known as the World Peace and Unification Sanctuary Church. It has been controversial for its advocacy of private ownership of firearms and for its support of the January 6 United States Capitol attack.

In 2015, the Unification Church opened a conference center in Las Vegas, Nevada. In 2016 a study sponsored by the Unification Theological Seminary found that American Unification Church members were divided in their choices in the 2016 United States presidential election, with the largest bloc supporting Senator Bernie Sanders. In 2018 The New York Times, which had previously been critical of the church, reported on the transitions taking place within its customs.

== See also ==
- List of Unification movement people
- New religious movements in the United States
- Sun Myung Moon
- Unification Church
