= Inquisition: The Persecution and Prosecution of the Reverend Sun Myung Moon =

1991 book by Carlton Sherwood

- Author: Carlton Sherwood
- Language: English
- Subject: Unification Church
- Genre: History
- Publisher: Regnery Publishing
- Publication date: 1991
- Publication place: United States
- Media type: Print (hardcover)
- Pages: 705
- ISBN: 978-0-89526-532-6

Inquisition: The Persecution and Prosecution of the Reverend Sun Myung Moon is a 1991 book by Carlton Sherwood about the early 1980s investigation and trial of Sun Myung Moon, the leader of the Unification Church, for alleged violations of United States tax law (see United States v. Sun Myung Moon). The book alleges that there were elements of racism and religious persecution in the prosecution of the Moon case. The book was published by Regnery Publishing, an American publisher which specializes in conservative books.

== Contents ==
Inquisition relates the story of Moon's life from his childhood in Korea but mainly focuses on the opposition he encountered in the United States after moving there in the 1970s and being active in religious, social, and political activism. Sherwood mentions opposition by the news media, major Christian denominations, and members of the government including Representative Donald Fraser and Senator Bob Dole. Sherwood characterizes this opposition as unfair, dishonest, and mean-spirited. He concludes that the federal prosecution of Moon on tax charges was unjust, citing the court's refusal to allow Moon's fellow defendant Takeru Kamiyama to provide his own translator, its refusal to allow the two men a bench trial rather than a jury trial, possible tainting of the jury, and the allegedly unusual length of Moon's sentence (18 months) for a U.S. federal tax conviction. He also mentions that Moon could have avoided the trial if he had remained outside of the United States.

Sherwood sums up his views by writing:

The Unification Church, its leaders and followers were and continue to be the victims of the worst kind of religious prejudice and racial bigotry this country has witnessed in over a century. Moreover, virtually every institution we as Americans hold sacred the Congress, the courts, law enforcement agencies, the press, even the U.S. Constitution itself was prostituted in a malicious, oftentimes brutal manner, as part of a determined effort to wipe out this small but expanding religious movement.

== Criticism of objectivity ==
In the documentary The Resurrection of Reverend Moon (January 21, 1992), the PBS television series Frontline produced a copy of a letter to Moon, from Unification Church of the United States leader James Gavin. He told Moon that he had reviewed the overall tone and factual contents of the book before publication and suggested revisions. He added: "Mr. Sherwood has assured me that all this will be done when the manuscript is sent to the publisher...When all of our suggestions have been incorporated, the book will be complete and in my opinion will make a significant impact...In addition to silencing our critics now, the book should be invaluable in persuading others of our legitimacy for many years to come."

== Sources ==
Reviews

- Book World staff (May 26, 1991). "Inquisition: The Persecution and Prosecution of the Reverend Sun Myung Moon". Book World. 21: 7.
- Flowers, Ronald B. (Winter 1993). "Inquisition: The Persecution and Prosecution of the Reverend Sun Myung Moon". Journal of Church and State. 35 (1): 164–165. doi:10.1093/jcs/35.1.164.
- Hart, Jeffrey (June 17, 1991). "Inquisition: The Persecution and Prosecution of the Reverend Sun Myung Moon". Insight on the News. 7 (24): 45.
- Oliver, Charles (February 1992). "Inquisition: The Persecution and Prosecution of the Reverend Sun Myung Moon". Reason. 23 (9): 64–65.
- Reference & Research Book News staff (June 1992). "Inquisition: The Persecution and Prosecution of the Reverend Sun Myung Moon". Reference & Research Book News. 7: 25.
- Robbins, Thomas (Summer 1992). "Inquisition: The Persecution and Prosecution of the Reverend Sun Myung Moon". Sociological Analysis. 53 (2): 232–234. doi:10.2307/3711129. JSTOR 3711129.
- Shupe, Anson (December 1992). "Inquisition: The Persecution and Prosecution of the Reverend Sun Myung Moon". The Journal for the Scientific Study of Religion. 31 (4): 552–553. doi:10.2307/1386876. JSTOR 1386876.
- World and I staff (September 1991). "Inquisition: The Persecution and Prosecution of the Reverend Sun Myung Moon". World and I. 6: 374.
- Yamamoto, J. Isamu (October 7, 1991). "Inquisition: The Persecution and Prosecution of the Reverend Sun Myung Moon". Christianity Today. 35 (11): 35–36.
