= Hyun Jin Moon =

Chairman of Global Peace Festival (born 1969)

Hyun Jin Preston Moon
- 문현진(文顯進)
- Born: Seoul, South Korea
- Education: Columbia University (BA); Harvard University (MBA)
- Occupations: Chairman of the Global Peace Foundation and Co-Founder of Family Peace Association
- Parents: Sun Myung Moon (father); Hak Ja Han (mother)

Hyun Jin Preston Moon is a South Korean social entrepreneur, founder and chairman of the Global Peace Foundation, and the Family Peace Association. His father, Sun Myung Moon, was the founder of the Unification Church, an international new religious movement.

== Early life and education ==
Born in South Korea, Moon moved to the United States at a young age and graduated from Columbia University with a bachelor's degree in history. He then graduated from Harvard Business School with an M.B.A. in 1998.

== Political positions ==
=== Korean unification ===
Moon has been involved in the campaign for Korean unification for a decade. In 2014, Moon wrote the book Korean Dream: A Vision for a Unified Korea. The book calls for greater public engagement with the unification issue, especially led by South Korean civil society organizations working in partnership with government. He urged the South Korean government to make unification its national agenda to lead global opinion, especially with heightened interest surrounding the North's increased nuclear threats.

Moon's approach to unification appeals to a shared historic, 5,000-year Korean identity, and particularly the ancient Korean ethic named "Hongik Ingan", which means "to broadly benefit humanity". He states that with Hongik Ingan as the guiding vision, "Unification will set the moral precedent for aligning with our historic heritage and providential destiny... to shine the light of hope opening the path for all people in a world mired in conflict."

Moon described his book as shifting the focus from technical questions of process to clarifying the end goal of unification. "I ask what type of new nation should Koreans aspire to establish, and what shared vision and enduring principles should guide them towards it," Moon wrote.

The Korean Culture and Arts Publications recognized Korean Dream: A Vision for a Unified Korea as the 2014 "Book of the Year" in the society category. An English version with a foreword by The Heritage Foundation founder Edwin Feulner was published in December 2016. The book was included in the U.S. Defense Intelligence Agency's 2018 Professional Reading List under the "Global Analysis" category.

Moon founded Action for Korea United, an alliance currently consisting of over 800 Korean civic groups, in 2012. In 2015, the coalition launched the One Korea Global Campaign committee to garner global support for Korean Unification through the medium of popular culture, especially K-pop. They have held two 'One K Concerts' towards that aim, in Seoul, Korea, and Manila, Philippines, featuring well-known artists.

=== New models of development ===
Moon has advocated the need for new development models that bring material prosperity without compromising spiritual and moral traditions, including traditional family values. He has advocated the Korean development model Saemaul Undong of the 1970s for encouraging self-reliance and promoting high standards of education to strengthen human capital. He has encouraged Korean industry leaders to invest in development projects in Paraguay, noting the developing nation's potential to become a hub for industrialization, distribution and service fields in South America.

=== Economic reform ===
Moon has pointed out the weaknesses of the South Korean economy since 2014. He presented a plan for economic reform to S. Korean business and government heads in preparation for peninsular unification.

Moon also advocated for economic reform in the Philippines, calling for less government interference in the marketplace, saying the country could play a key role to economically lead ASEAN and promote peace and stability.

=== Youth leadership ===
Moon, whose various businesses have benefitted from the fundraising activities of his father's followers, has spoken at various venues and programs encouraging youth leadership as a significant resource to benefit the greater society by challenging conventional norms with fresh perspectives and passion.

== Ventures ==
=== Global Peace Foundation ===
The Global Peace Foundation, founded in 2009, is an international nonprofit organization with a stated mission to promote "an innovative, values-based approach to peacebuilding."

Moon asserts that peace efforts require effective approaches to preventing and resolving conflicts rooted in universal principles and values and a vision that can guide the formation of free and prosperous civil societies.

The Global Peace Foundation annually co-organizes the Global Youth Summit in the Philippines to engage and inspire young people in addressing the world's persistent problems.

=== Family Peace Association ===
The Family Peace Association is an international peace organization, founded December 2, 2017, in Seoul, South Korea, where it announced its mission: "To enlighten humanity by uplifting their spiritual consciousness through universal principles and values rooted in God-centered families". The co-founders of the Family Peace Association are Hyun Jin Moon and Junsook Moon.

== Moon family ==
The Moon family has pursued Korean unification for 3 generations. Hyun Jin Preston Moon's great-uncle was a prominent member of the Korean independence movement, and helped draft the Korean Declaration of Independence. His father, Sun Myung Moon, founder of the Unification Church was at the forefront of engagement with North Korea, starting in 1991.

== Personal life ==
Moon regularly competed in equestrianism from a young age. He went on to become a two-time competitor at the Olympics as part of the South Korean team, competing in Seoul 1988 and Barcelona 1992 Olympics.

Moon is married to Jun Sook Moon. They have nine children.

== See also ==
- List of Unification movement people
- Unification Church
- Unification Church of the United States
