= Stolen Honor =

- Directed by: Carlton Sherwood
- Written by: Carlton Sherwood
- Starring: Carlton Sherwood
- Production companies: Red, White and Blue Productions
- Release date: 2004
- Running time: 45 minutes
- Country: United States
- Language: English

Stolen Honor is a 45-minute anti-John Kerry video documentary that was released during the September 2004 election season. It features interviews with a number of American men who contend they were prisoners of war in North Vietnam and suffered increased maltreatment while prisoners as a direct result of Kerry's Fulbright Hearing testimony in April 1971. The subtitle of the film is Wounds That Never Heal; on the production company's website the complete title is given instead as Stolen Honor: John Kerry's Record of Betrayal. Its name was based on the book Stolen Valor: How the Vietnam Generation Was Robbed of Its Heroes and Its History by B.G. Burkett and Glenna Whitley.

The production company's website states that "Stolen Honor investigates how John Kerry's actions during the Vietnam era impacted the treatment of American soldiers and POWs. Using John Kerry's own words, the documentary juxtaposes John Kerry's actions with the words of veterans who were still in Vietnam when John Kerry was leading the anti-war movement."

== Red White and Blue Productions ==
Stolen Honor was a project of Red, White and Blue Productions, based in Harrisburg, Pennsylvania, whose public affairs are managed by Quantum Communications, a company owned by lobbyist Charlie Gerow, who also acted as publicist for the film. In 2000, Gerow ran on the Republican ticket for Congress. In 2003, he was nominated by President Bush to be a member of the Benjamin Franklin Tercentenary Commission.

Carlton Sherwood, the producer of Stolen Honor, was a United States Marine Corps veteran who won a Pulitzer Prize in 1980 for his work for the Gannett News Service. His appointments to several positions by Republican politicians has been cited as evidence of partisan bias and his journalism has been criticized. In 1983 he was responsible for a four-part series on a Washington DC television station which charged the Vietnam Veterans Memorial Fund with misspending—if not stealing—donated money. The following year, after a GAO audit and threats of a lawsuit, the station broadcast a retraction. Inquisition, his investigation of the 1982 tax fraud prosecution of the Reverend Sun Myung Moon (leader of the Unification Church) was published in 1991. The following year the PBS documentary series Frontline reported that James Gavin, an aide to Moon, had reviewed the "overall tone and factual contents" of the manuscript and that Sherwood had agreed to his revisions. Sherwood denied that the Unification Church exerted editorial control over the book.

== Interviewees ==
One of the ex-POWs interviewed in Stolen Honor is USAF Col. (ret.) Kenneth Cordier, who was dismissed from his role as volunteer member of the 2004 Bush campaign veterans steering committee after it was noticed that he had appeared in the second Swift Boat Veterans for Truth (SBVT) ad. The Bush campaign had denied Democratic charges that it was coordinating with the tax-exempt 527 group.

In October 2004, one of the Marine veterans shown in the film, University of Delaware professor Kenneth J. Campbell, sued Sherwood over his depiction in the film.

== October 2004 media controversy ==
In early October 2004, it was reported that Sinclair Broadcast Group, which owns television stations in nearly one-quarter of the United States, had ordered all of its stations to air Stolen Honor in the days leading up to the November 2 presidential election.

These news reports touched off a media firestorm. According to television critic Alessandra Stanley, formerly of The New York Times:

Stolen Honor: Wounds That Never Heal, the highly contested anti-Kerry documentary, should not be shown by the Sinclair Broadcast Group. It should be shown in its entirety on all the networks, cable stations and on public television. This histrionic, often specious and deeply sad film does not do much more damage to Senator John Kerry's reputation than have the Swift Boat Veterans for Truth's negative ads, which have flooded television markets in almost every swing state. But it does help viewers better understand the rage fueling the unhappy band of brothers who oppose Mr. Kerry's candidacy and his claim to heroism. ... [T]his film is payback time, a chance to punish one of the most famous antiwar activists, Mr. Kerry, the one who got credit for serving with distinction in combat, then, through the eyes of the veterans in this film, went home to discredit the men left behind." She also said that Stolen Honor's imagery "is crude, but powerful". She also made clear however, that Stolen Honor had various "distortions... intended to hurt Mr. Kerry at the polls".

The news of the possible Sinclair broadcast was followed by various complaints that such a broadcast would violate the "equal time" provision of the Communications Act that governs airtime for political candidates.

When questioned about this contention, then current FCC chairman Michael Powell announced the FCC position that a broadcast of this documentary would not be a violation of the equal time provision. However, former FCC chairman, Reed Hundt, contended that Powell was offering "tacit and plain encouragement of the use of the Sinclair airwaves to pursue a smear campaign."

A spokesperson for Sinclair said that the airing would be followed by a panel discussion, which Kerry would be asked to join. The Kerry campaign declined the invitation. Sinclair did not accept an offer from Michael Moore for free a broadcast of his documentary Fahrenheit 9/11.

Sinclair's then Washington bureau chief, Jon Lieberman, publicly condemned the expected broadcast in an interview in The Baltimore Sun:

It's biased political propaganda, with clear intentions to sway this election. For me, it's not about right or left—it's about what's right or wrong in news coverage this close to an election.

Shortly after making this statement to the newspaper, Lieberman was fired. Sinclair Vice President Mark Hyman said, "Everyone is entitled to their personal opinion, including Jon Leiberman. We are disappointed that Jon's political views caused him to speak to the press about company business." Lieberman said of the company that made the film, "It's propaganda. It's meant to sway the election — we've been told that by people inside the company." According to Rolling Stone reporters, many Sinclair employees said privately that they agreed with Leiberman: "I was glad that someone finally had the guts to say something. Everyone who works there feels the same way and says it in private, but it doesn't leave the building."

== Reception ==
Mark Nevins, a spokesman for the Kerry presidential campaign, stated: "This group is the poor, distant cousin of the Swift Boat Veterans for Bush. It's comprised of people with questionable backgrounds whose sole mission in life is to smear John Kerry." (Nevins was making a derisive reference to Swift Boat Veterans for Truth, an anti-Kerry organization.)

According to conservative commentator Deroy Murdock, "It presents POWs who argue that John Kerry's fallacious spring 1971 claims that U.S. atrocities occurred "on a day-to-day basis with the full awareness of officers at all levels of command" amplified their agony under America's North Vietnamese enemies."

Reacting to reports that Sinclair was to air Stolen Honor shortly before the election, members of the United States Congress asked the FCC to consider the legality of the planned broadcast. The Democratic National Committee filed a complaint with the Federal Election Commission. As this controversy made the news, with a number of Sinclair advertisers pulling their ads and Sinclair stock dropping 17% in eleven days, Sinclair announced that it had never intended to air Stolen Honor in an hour slot in the first place, indicating that it might instead show clips of the video in a discussion panel format. Ultimately, Sinclair broadcast 4 minutes of excerpts from the film.

In October 2005, Sherwood sued John Kerry and Kerry's Pennsylvania campaign manager, Anthony T. Podesta. The suit alleged that the defendants defamed Sherwood by stating in a "widely circulated e-mail" that Sherwood [is] "a disgraced former journalist" who "crawled out of the gutter". It also alleged "conspiracy and interference with contractual relations". Podesta responded that Sherwood "had his 15-minute Andy Warhol moment last year. Maybe he wants another." On August 3, 2006, Sherwood's lawsuit was dismissed by a federal judge.
