= Family Peace Association =

International peace organisation

The Family Peace Association is an international peace organization. It was inaugurated on December 2, 2017, in Seoul, South Korea, where it announced its mission: "To enlighten humanity by uplifting their spiritual consciousness through universal principles and values rooted in God-centered families.". The co-founders of the Family Peace Association are Hyun Jin Moon (one of the sons of Unification Church founder Sun Myung Moon) and Junsook Moon. Jinman Kwak is its president.

The Family Peace Association is one of the successors to the HSA-UWC (widely known as the Unification Church and informally as the Moonies). The others are the Rod of Iron Ministries, led by Hyun Jin Moon's brothers Hyung Jin Moon and Kook Jin Moon, and The Women's Federation for World Peace led by their mother Hak Ja Han. Hyun Jin Moon also founded the Global Peace Foundation, in 2009.

== Relation to Sun Myung Moon and the Family Federation for World Peace and Unification ==
Sun Myung Moon established the HSA-UWC (Unification Church) in 1954. He stated that the association was meant to foster ecumenical cooperation among Christian sects to promote families with deep spirituality and a commitment to serving their larger society. In 1994, Rev. Moon declared the completion of the mission of HSA-UWC aiming to dissolve the Unification Church structure. The Family Federation for World Peace and Unification was established in the mid-1990s by Sun Myung Moon. Sun Myung Moon stated at the founding of the FFWPU that he never intended to create a new religion, but to open an age after religion where families would serve as the core of spiritual and character growth.

Two years later the FFWPU was launched as a new entity to advance Unification Church theology and principles. The FFWPU was created as a broad-based social movement to promote healthy families and strong societies. According to a memo from the HSA-UWC North America Headquarters in 1997, from the beginning it was clear that the two entities, FFWPU and HSA-UWC, were completely separate, both in objectives and legally.

Hyun Jin Moon was appointed vice-president of the Family Federation for World Peace and Unification in 1998 and held the role for ten years. In 2017, he stated, "I can no longer work through the FFWPU because it is not true to my father's original mission", and dedicated the Family Peace Association as the "new vehicle" to realize his father's intentions of "creating a global movement to inspire all humanity to establish God-centered families.".

== Relation to the Unification Church ==
In his address at the inaugural opening of the FPA, Hyun Jin Moon expressed that the FPA was created to carry on the trans-religious work his late father, Sun Myung Moon, sought to accomplish with the establishment of the FFWPU. Since Sun Myung Moon's death in 2012, several factions of the Unification Church have been established. While his son Hyun Jin Moon created the Family Peace Association, his youngest son, Hyung Jin Moon started the Sanctuary Church, while his widow Hak Ja Han has continued to lead the Unification Church (Also known as FFWPU - Family Federation for World Peace and Unification).

== Beliefs ==
The FPA believes that all people are a unique creation of God, and members of a human family.

The FPA believes that the family is a sacred institution for God's original vision of creation. The FPA sees its role as providing a meeting space for like-minded families.

The FPA does not define itself as a church, but says it is a faith community and a movement of ideal families.

The FPA follows the main rituals established by Sun Myung Moon including daily study of holy books, the Blessing marriage ceremony and the Seong Hwa funeral ceremony.

== Projects ==
The FPA operates across several countries including Korea, Japan, US, Philippines, Mongolia, Taiwan, Nepal, Thailand, Malaysia, Germany, Kenya, Nigeria, Uganda, Paraguay, Uruguay, Brazil, Chile, Peru and Colombia.

It offers educational programmes for young people, guidance for parents and leadership training, as well as community projects.

== See also ==
- Global Peace Foundation
