= Subcommittee on International Organizations of the Committee on International Relations =

1976–1977 U.S. committee on Koreagate

The Subcommittee on International Organizations of the Committee on International Relations (also known as the Fraser Committee) was a committee of the U.S. House of Representatives which met in 1976 and 1977 and conducted an investigation into the "Koreagate" scandal. It was chaired by Representative Donald M. Fraser of Minnesota. The committee's 447-page report, made public on November 29, 1977, reported on plans by the National Intelligence Service (South Korea) (KCIA) to manipulate American institutions to the advantage of South Korean government policies, overtly and covertly.

== Hearings ==
The committee conducted an extensive investigation into South Korea–United States relations, and held a series of hearings. The committee's hearings were highly publicized, and the term "Koreagate" began to be used by American news media outlets at the time.

During these hearings, former KCIA director Kim Hyong-uk testified that he had offered favors to Pak Tong-sun in exchange for the latter's efforts to lobby in Washington, D.C. Kim also testified that a month before the hearings, South Korean president Park Chung Hee had attempted to dissuade him from testifying, and had ordered his kidnapping or assassination if he proceeded to testify.

Various members of the Unification Church of the United States testified that churchmembers had been involved in attempts to lobby congress. Dan Fefferman, a leader in the Unification Church of the United States, refused to cooperate fully during the hearings.

== Fraser Report ==
The committee made its findings public in what became known as the "Fraser report". The committee's report that there were South Korean plans to plant an intelligence network in the White House and to influence the United States Congress, newsmedia, clergy, and educators. The report found that Korean businessman Tongsun Park had begun lobbying for in 1970, immediately after Nixon withdrew the U.S. Seventh Army division from South Korea.

The committee found that the KCIA was working with Sun Myung Moon, founder of the Unification Church of the United States, and that some church members worked as volunteers in congressional offices. Together they founded the Korean Culture and Freedom Foundation, a nonprofit organization which undertook a public diplomacy campaign for the Republic of Korea. The committee also investigated possible KCIA influence on the Unification movement's campaign in support of Richard Nixon during the Watergate scandal.

The report of the committee also found that the KCIA planned to grant money to American universities in order to attempt to influence them for political purposes. It also said that the KCIA had harassed and intimidated Korean people living in the United States if they protested against Republic of Korea government policies.

== Aftermath ==
In response to the investigation, the House Committee on Standards of Official Conduct filed and heard charges against members of the United States House of Representatives. Congressman Richard T. Hanna was convicted of conspiracy to defraud the United States Government, and was sentenced to serve between 6 and 30 months in prison.

The ethics committee censured Edward R. Roybal for failing to report that he had received a $1,000 gift from Park. Two other congressmen, Charles H. Wilson and John J. McFall were reprimanded. A fourth congressman, Edward J. Patten, was found not guilty. The committee investigated claims that Edward Derwinski had leaked confidential information to South Korean officials, but the inquiry ended inconclusively.

Kim Hyong-uk disappeared in October 1979, and was reportedly assassinated on the orders of Kim Jae-kyu, then-director of the KCIA.

== See also ==
- South Korea–United States relations
- List of United States House of Representatives committees
- Gifts of Deceit
- Unification Church political activities
- Unification Church and North Korea
- Unification Church of the United States
