= ECollege =

eCollege.com, Inc.
- Company type: A Pearson Company
- Industry: Education and Technology
- Founded: July 26, 1996; 29 years ago (as Real Education); April 12, 1999; 27 years ago (as eCollege)
- Headquarters: Denver, Colorado, United States
- Key people: Matt Leavy CEO
- Products: (see below)
- Number of employees: 500+ (2010)
- Website: www.ecollege.com

Pearson eCollege is an on-demand, or software as a service (SaaS), provider of eLearning software and services to secondary and post-secondary learning institutions and is owned by Pearson PLC. ECollege was founded in 1996 as Real Education, the company went public in 1999. as eCollege.com (NASDAQ: ECLG) and acquired by Pearson in 2007

== eCollege Application Retirement ==
The eCollege team started transferring its maintenance work in Sri Lanka prior it acquiring the Pearson. Pearson completely transferred the maintenance of eCollege platform from USA to Sri Lanka, by keeping the application hosted in Denver. Pearson gradually started the clean ups and retirement of eCollege platform. Finally Pearson completely shutdown the eCollege platform at 2023 October.

== See also ==
- History of virtual learning environments
- Virtual learning environment
