= Global Peace Foundation =

International nonprofit organization

- Formation: 2009
- Founder: Hyun Jin Moon
- Headquarters: Lanham, Maryland, United States
- Website: http://www.globalpeace.org
- Formerly called: Global Peace Festival Foundation

The Global Peace Foundation (GPF) is an international nonprofit organization with a stated mission to promote “an innovative, values-based approach to peacebuilding, guided by the vision of One Family under God.” GPF partners with government ministries, community and faith-based organizations, and United Nations offices to develop and execute programs in 20 countries.

GPF programs place special emphasis on values and ideals grounded in the world's faith and wisdom traditions to foster social cohesion, bridge religious, cultural and ethnic divisions, strengthen families, and support youth through values education and entrepreneurial training. GPF programs, which include the Character and Creativity education initiative, All-Lights Village project, Latin American Presidential Mission, International Young Leaders Assembly and Interfaith Alliance to Abolish Human Trafficking (Safe Haven Campaign). have been recognized with awards and citations from the governments of Korea, Nepal and Malaysia, as well as by the United Nations Office at Nairobi, Kenya.

Founded in 2009 by Hyun Jin Moon as the Global Peace Festival Foundation, the organization originally sponsored cultural and sports festivals as an approach to promote social cohesion and mitigate religious and ethnic divisions. It was renamed the Global Peace Foundation in 2012 to better reflect the broader scope of activities being implemented worldwide.

GPF is accreditation in UN ECOSOC Special Consultative Status and affiliation to the UN Department of Public Information (DPI) since 2019.

== History ==
=== Background ===
GPF founder Hyun Jin Preston Moon, an Olympic equestrian, first visited Paraguay in 2007 and travelled on horseback through the remote Chaco region to learn about the life of Paraguay's vaqueros, or ranchers. Impressed by the experience, he later addressed the National Congress on the value of Paraguay's traditions, and the importance of ethics and values in public life. In July 2008 Moon organized a cultural peace festival and city-wide youth service projects in Asuncion. The Global Peace Festival Foundation (GPFF) was then formally incorporated in 2009, with national offices in Paraguay and the Philippines.

In December 2009, the first Global Peace Convention was hosted in Manila, Philippines, drawing participants from government, civil society, and religious institutions from 28 countries. The convention examined the role of interfaith initiatives, youth activities and service projects in resolving conflict and sustaining peace. Selected participants traveled to Mindanao, a region with a 40-year, ongoing conflict that has claimed the lives of an estimated 160,000 people, on a fact-finding tour of GPF agriculture and aquaculture pilot programs aimed to promote economic livelihoods and to mitigate divisions between Muslims, Christians and indigenous peoples in the region.

2010 - 2012

In 2010, GPFF advanced environmental and youth service projects in Kenya and Nepal, including a clean-up of the polluted Nairobi River that gathered thousands of local volunteers, and establishment of the Rift Valley Peace Initiative in a region that witnessed some of the worst outbreaks of ethnic violence following the disputed elections of 2007–08. The 2010 Global Peace Convention, “One Family under God: Conflict Resolution, Peace and Development,” in Nairobi won the backing of Kenyan President Mwai Kibaki and Prime Minister Raila Odinga, political rivals who governed Kenya in a power-sharing arrangement. More than 1000 participants from 40 nations attended the convention.

Global Peace Foundation expanded its work in 2011 with a conference in Mongolia focusing on Northeast Asia peace and the special role of Mongolia, which has normalized diplomatic relations with both North and South Korea, in reducing tensions and promoting economic development on the Korean peninsula. The 2011 Global Peace Convention in Seoul, South Korea hosted experts and policy makers from 40 countries with a focus on prospects for Korean unification and scenarios for a post-unification culture.

In 2011 GPF Malaysia in partnership with Malaysia's Department of National Unity and Integration, and the Asian Football Confederation sponsored Midnight Football clinics, as well as character, leadership, health and motivation camps to support troubled and unguided youth, “using football as the main platform of change so that they become useful and contributing citizens.”

In 2011 and 2012 Global Peace Foundation organized multiple forums and conferences in Latin America to address underdevelopment, crime, and government corruption in the region. GPF work in Paraguay included the introduction of character education in public schools with support from Paraguay's Ministry of Education, and economic development projects in Alto Paraguay, the largest, poorest, and most sparsely populated region of the country.

GPF also enlisted support from former heads of state from throughout Latin America to advance economic development and good governance in the region. The 2012 Global Peace Convention, “Moral and Innovative Leadership: Building Healthy Families, Ethical Societies, and a Global Culture of Peace,” in Atlanta, USA marked the launch of the Latin American Presidential Mission at the Carter Presidential Center and the participation of nine former heads of state.

2013 - 2014

The Global Peace Foundation began work in Nigeria in 2013 in response to growing extremist violence with a series of conferences and meetings that gathered prominent Muslim and Christian clerics and traditional rulers. Just days after a declaration of a state of emergency in three states by Nigerian President Goodluck Jonathan, GPF held a Consultative Meeting, “The Role of Religious Leaders and Traditional Rulers in Building a Culture of Peace, National Unity and Integration,” on May 16, 2013, in Abuja, Nigeria's capital. A Global Peace Leadership Conference and festival in November sponsored in partnership with the Institute for Peace and Conflict Resolution, an agency of Nigeria's Ministry of Foreign Affairs, inaugurated the nationwide One Family under God campaign to mitigate sectarian divisions.

Another conference outcome was the launch of the African Peace Service Corps and the Africa Leadership Mission on Peace-building, Young Leadership and Service, co-chaired by Seychelles founding President Sir James Mancham and former Nigerian President Olusegun Obasanjo.

The 2013 Global Peace Convention in Kuala Lumpur, Malaysia included a delegation of 40 Nigerian political and religious leaders. Malaysian Prime Minister Najib was presented with the Global Peace Award for Promoting a Culture of Peace at the conclusion of the convention.

In 2014 Global Peace Foundation brought Nigerian Christian and Muslim leaders to Northern Ireland to examine lessons learned from Northern Ireland's experience in ending 30 years of armed conflict.

GPF convened a conference of scholars and political leaders in Seoul, Korea in June 2014 on the theme “Vision, Principles and Values of a Unified Korea,” and supported a range of public education and humanitarian projects to advance prospects for Korean unification. GPF was a lead organizer of a coalition of more than 400 NGOs, Action for Korea United, to support eventual unification.

The 2014 Global Peace Convention in Asuncion, Paraguay highlighted GPF efforts in Paraguay to build a model of “national transformation” that included the expansion of character education in primary and secondary schools, the establishment of a women's division to support gender equity and affirm the importance of the family in transmitting values, economic development projects in Alto Paraguay, and establishment of a research institute, Instituto de Desarrollo del Pensamiento Patria Soñada, to engage scholars, economists and political scientists in developing a roadmap for national development in Paraguay.

Paraguayan President Horatio Cartes, Vice President Juan Afara, Speaker of the Parliament Hugo Velazaquez and fourteen former heads of state joined an estimated 3,300 participants from 40 countries for the Global Peace Convention on November 19–21, 2014. The convention included assemblies of more than 1,000 women leaders and youth leaders, and the Second Summit of the Latin American Presidential Mission, with former presidents from Paraguay, Uruguay, Argentina, Bolivia, Ecuador, Costa Rica, El Salvador, Guatemala, and the Dominican Republic participating in presidential summit and conference sessions.

In October 2014, the United Nations Economic and Social Commission for Asia and the Pacific (ESCAP), UNESCO, the Global Peace Foundation and the Global Young Leaders Academy convened the Asia-Pacific Conference on Youth Volunteerism to Promote Participation, Development and Peace at the United Nations Conference Centre in Bangkok, Thailand.

Participants from 40 nations discussed partnerships in the sectors of environment, health, disaster response, peace and development, entrepreneurship and education, and ways “to enhance knowledge and strategies with regard to youth participation in the Post-2015 Development Agenda.”

2015 - 2016

On March 23–25, 2015, the UN Economic and Social Commission for Asia and the Pacific (ESCAP), Nepal's Ministry of Youth and Sports and the Global Peace Foundation convened the South Asia Subregional Consultation on Youth Volunteerism to Promote Participation, Development and Peace in Kathmandu, Nepal. The convening drew participants from 17 countries—including Australia, Bangladesh, Canada, China, India, Italy, Indonesia, Japan, Kenya, Malaysia, Mongolia, Nepal, Philippines, South Korea, Thailand, United Kingdom and United States—to support the new Youth Vision 2025 policy being launched by Nepal's Ministry of Youth and Sports and strengthen existing international service networks and partnerships.

The Nepal convening was supported by partners including the U.S. Peace Corps, KOICA, Australian Volunteers International, JCYC Nepal, Nepalese Young Entrepreneurs' Forum, Nepal Water Week and Global Peace Youth - Nepal.

Following the 7.8 magnitude earthquake that struck central Nepal on April 25, the Global Peace Foundation and Asia-Pacific Peace and Development Service Alliance worked to coordinate youth volunteer efforts in support of earthquake victims.

The ongoing emergency volunteer mobilization is part of a long-term strategic development plan for Nepal supported by the Global Peace Foundation, Nepal's Ministry of Youth and Sports, the Asia Pacific Peace and Development Service Alliance, and the Alliance's many international, regional and national public and private partners and youth networks.

A Global Peace Leadership Conference was held in Belfast, Northern Ireland in September 2016.

== Countries of Involvement (List) ==
As of 2022, The Global Peace Foundation has initiatives in 22 nations.

=== The Americas ===
- Brazil
- Guatemala
- Paraguay
- United States
- Uruguay

=== Asia ===
- Cambodia
- India
- Indonesia
- Japan
- Korea
- Malaysia
- Mongolia
- Nepal
- Philippines
- Thailand

=== Africa ===
- Kenya
- Nigeria
- Tanzania
- Uganda

=== Europe ===
- Ireland
- United Kingdom

== Projects and Activities by Region ==
United States

Global Peace Foundation and the Center for Strategic and International Studies co-hosted a series of forums on the topic of Korean Peninsula Unification in D.C. throughout 2015.

Global Peace Foundation USA held the Global Peace Leadership conference in September 19–21, 2014 in Washington, DC.

Asia

In 2010, Global Peace Festival South Asia was held in Kathmandu, Nepal to promote interfaith cooperation In August 2013, Global Peace Foundation began discussions for the creation of a "Global Service Corps" in the Asia-Pacific Region. The concept was proposed as a corps of volunteers who are advocates of service, both abroad and at home, and working together on a multi-nation partnership.

India

On September 21, 2013, the International Day of Peace, the Global Peace and Harmony Conference was co-hosted by the Jawaharlal Nehru University and Global Peace Foundation India with the theme, “World peace and harmony through ancient Indian wisdom in the 21st century.”

Malaysia

Global Peace Women's Malaysia chapter was launched in April 2012 with the wife of the Deputy Prime Minister of Malaysia as its chair.

Nepal

In 2013, Global Peace Foundation Nepal partnered with Kangwon Land Co. Ltd, a South Korean company, to launch 'Nepal High 1 Hope Village’, a project to improve living and educational standards the local communities in Bharat Pokhari-7 in Kaski district, Nepal.

As part of the 2015 earthquake relief efforts in Nepal, Global Peace Foundation helped the collection and distribution of supplies such as bedding, food, and roofing iron.

Philippines

In 2013, a Global Peace Leadership Conference was held in the Philippines from November 20–22 in the Manila Hotel, with the theme “Moral and Innovative Leadership: A Platform for Sustainable Peace and Development”. The conference was endorsed by the Philippines Department of Education and Commission on Higher Education and included a youth peace contest, a coastal cleanup of Manila Bay and the launching of the Global Peace Volunteers project in the country

Nigeria

In Nigeria, the "One Family Under God" campaign involves Muslims and Christians in retreats that focus not just on having dialogues related to beliefs and theology, but related to actual cooperation at local and community levels. "The campaign ‘One Family under God’ is like an antidote, against the appeal of extremists," said Michael Marshall, Global Peace Foundation director of Communications, in a briefing at the Global Peace Convention 2013 in Kuala Lumpur, Malaysia, at a plenary session titled "Building social cohesion for sustainable peace."

In 2013, a Global Peace Leadership Conference was held in Nigeria where President Goodluck Ebele Jonathan and former President Olusegun Obasanjo spoke on religious extremism in the country and the importance of traditional faith leaders to properly represent their faith teachings.

== See also ==
- Family Peace Association
