= Blessing ceremony of the Unification Church =

Large-scale wedding or marriage rededication ceremony sponsored by the Unification Church

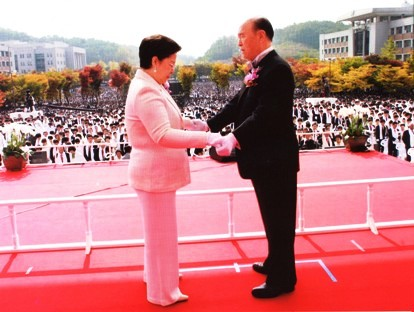
Sun Myung Moon and his wife Hak Ja Han preside over a mass blessing ceremony.

The Holy Marriage Blessing Ceremony (축복결혼식), often abbreviated to Blessing, is a large-scale wedding, or a marriage rededication ceremony, sponsored by the Unification Church. It is given to married or engaged couples. Through it, members of the Unification Church believe that the couple is removed from the lineage of sinful humanity and engrafted into God's sinless lineage. As a result, the couple's marital relationship—and any children born after the Blessing—exist free from the consequences of original sin. Children born into Blessed Central Families are known as Blessed Children or second generation, third generation, etc.

For Unificationists, these interracial, interreligious and international mass marriage ceremonies symbolize the family as the hope for peace. The Blessing ceremony has become the most famous ritual of the Unification Church. The people who receive the Blessing are called "Blessed Central Families" (축복중심가정) who are conducive to the establishment of Cheon Il Guk (천일국,天一國, Kingdom of Heaven).

== Purpose ==
Frank Kaufmann, a prominent Unificationist, wrote:

We do not have mass weddings because Reverend Moon doesn't know any better, doesn't know how Americans react to things, or that he stubbornly adheres to some odd Korean habit. Our matchings and weddings are a direct and perfect manifestation of a profound theology and world view. You see, Unificationists believe that all the problems on Earth, from the Gulf War, to child abuse, to the crumbling school system (you name it) are fruits of the fact that self-interest crept into the family, the love between husband and wife, reproductive affairs, and parent-child relationships, thus since the beginning there has never been even one family whose members were not dominated by some significant degree of self-interest.

Scholars have noted the Blessing ceremony allows Unification Church members to express their belief in an international, inter-racial "family of God". In the words of the Reverend Moon, he once described the meaning of the Marriage Blessing:

Then what is the ultimate reason why we need to do it? It is because our human ancestors fell. If our first ancestors had not fallen, it would not be necessary for us to receive the Blessing. But we have to reverse the fallen process. We have no other way to return to God's realm of authority than through a course that restores the fall. That is why human beings until now have pursued religion, for this is the direction and purpose of human history.

== History ==
=== Blessings of Unification Church members ===
The Blessing ceremony was first held in 1961 for 36 couples in Seoul, South Korea, by Sun Myung Moon and his wife Hak Ja Han, shortly after their own marriage in 1960. All the couples were members of the Unification Church. Moon matched all of the couples except the 12 who were already married to each other from before joining the Unification Church, which was officially founded in 1954.

Later Blessing ceremonies were larger in scale but followed the same pattern with all participants Unification Church members and Moon matching most of the couples. In 1982 the first large scale Blessing held outside of Korea took place in Madison Square Garden in New York City. In 1988, Moon matched 2,500 Korean members with Japanese members for a Blessing ceremony held in Korea, partly in order to promote unity between the two nations.

Most Unification Church members had lived communally and celibately after joining the church. After marriage they returned to the traditional Christian family form of monogamy. Blessing ceremonies have attracted attention in the press and in the public imagination, often being labeled "mass weddings". People who have never met, from completely different countries, were paired by the Messiah of the Unification Church by "matching". They were informed that a certain person, specially chosen for him/her by the Messiah, would become their husband/wife. Some of them did not see their future partner until the day of the Blessing ceremony.

Some couples were already married and those that were engaged were later legally married according to the laws of their own countries. Meant to highlight the church's emphasis on traditional morality, they brought Moon and the Unification Church both fame and controversy.

=== Blessing extended to non-members ===
The 1990s saw a big change when Sun Myung Moon allowed the Blessing to be given to other people besides Unification Church members. This liberalization led to a great increase in the number of Blessed couples, with most of them having been already married and not Unification Church members. It is possible for any Blessed couple to give the Blessing to other couples and this is being done in many cases by ministers of other churches who have received the Blessing though their association with the Unification Church. Ministers of other faiths, including Judaism and Islam have served as "co-officiators" at Blessing ceremonies presided over by Sun Myung Moon and Hak Ja Han. Since 2001 Unification Church member couples Blessed by Moon have been able to arrange marriages for their own children, without his direct guidance.

== Process ==
Adult Unificationists (those who joined on their own without family ties) and Blessed Children (those whose parents received the Blessing of Marriage) each follow a similar yet distinct process in preparing for marriage, being matched (engaged) and finally receiving the Blessing. Non-Unificationists (people of other faiths, nonreligious) who believe in the ideals of the church teachings can also be part of the Marriage Blessing. People who are already married are also welcome and can begin walking a path towards the Blessing. On October 3, 1976, Reverend Moon is quoted saying "The international Blessing developed by the Unification Church is not a wedding which is limited to only Unification Church members. This is the official course that all human beings must pass through. We should clearly understand this fact."

The basic process for children who grew up in the church and others who want to get married is described in their official website. There, it also describes the training and workshops one must go through to understand the value of the Blessing, become candidates and learn why marriage is the key for building God's Kingdom. Adult Unificationists and Blessed Children can receive support from either their parents or their matching advisors as they prepare for the matching and the Blessing. Married couples can go through marriage enhancement workshops after being Blessed.

== Ceremonial practices ==
The traditional steps for completing the sanctity of the blessing ceremony is the following:

1. The Chastening Ceremony. The couple strike each other on the backside three times using a wooden stick to symbolically make an end to sin and prepare for a new beginning.
2. The Holy Wine Ceremony. The couple share a cup of Holy Wine (or grape juice) symbolizing their engrafting into God's sinless lineage.
3. The Holy Blessing Ceremony. The couple exchange vows. A prayer is offered by the officiators. The couple is sprinkled with holy water.
4. The Separation Period. The couple refrains from having sexual relations for a period (most often 40 days, but in some cases much longer) before consummating or re-consummating their marriage.
5. The Three Day Ceremony. The couple begins, or re-begins, their married life in a highly symbolic ceremony over three days which is considered to reverse the fall of Adam and Eve. They have sex three times--twice with the woman on top, then once with the man on top--beneath a photo of Rev. Moon.

Couples taking part in Blessing ceremonies exchange these four vows:

1. To become a true man or woman who practices sexual purity and lives for the sake of others.
2. To become a true husband or wife who respects True Parents' example and establishes an eternal family which brings joy to God.
3. To become a parent who educates his or her children to follow the tradition of true love for the sake of the family and world.
4. To create an ideal family which contributes to world peace.

== Notable events ==
In 1997, Sun Myung Moon and Hak Ja Han presided over a Blessing ceremony in Washington, D.C., in which 28,000 of the 30,000 couples taking part were previously married, including Baptist minister and civil rights advocate Al Sharpton and his wife Katherine. A 2000 ceremony included couples in North Korea. In a 2001 ceremony George Augustus Stallings, founder of the Imani Temple African-American Catholic Congregation, married Sayomi Kamimoto, a Japanese Unification Church member. At the same ceremony was Minister Benjamin Muhammad, the national director of the Million Man March and the Million Family March and a representative of Louis Farrakhan's Nation of Islam. Former Ugandan President Godfrey Binaisa married Tomoko Yamamoto, a 58-year-old Japanese woman during the Blessing ceremony in 2004. At that time, of the wedding, which took place remotely with Godfrey present over a satellite video link, he was 84 years old. A Blessing Ceremony was held at Headquarters of the United Nations in 2000.

Such marriages proved to have the same level of marital happiness as the general population, according to scientific research. "Whatever anyone wants to say about the Unification Church, the marital aspect seems to work," said Robert Epstein, a research psychologist. The Unification Church teaches that romantic love leads to sexual promiscuity, mismatched couples and dysfunctional societies.

The Unification Church affected the demographic map of mono-ethnic Korea due to its Blessing Ceremony. South Korea has an acute problem of gender imbalance. Consequently, there is a large shortage of marriageable women. More than half of female immigrants from the Philippines, Thailand and other countries came to Korea due to the Unification Church and less than 20% through marriage agencies.

In 2009, a blessing ceremony for 7,000 couples was attended by the Vice Speaker of the National Assembly of the Republic of Korea and by the daughter of the late President Park Chung Hee. She said: "I join in a trans-religious spirit. I like the Unification Church way of interpreting the Bible, incorporating the Quran and Buddhist scripts".

== Reaction ==
Moon's practice of matching couples was very unusual in both Christian tradition and in modern Western culture and attracted much attention and controversy. Members of some churches have expressed concerns that people of their churches taking part in Blessing ceremonies might join the Unification Church. In 1998, journalist Peter Maass reported that some Unification Church members were dismayed and grumbled when Moon extended the Blessing to non-members because they had not gone through the same course that members had.

In 2001, the Unification Church came into conflict with the Roman Catholic Church when 71-year-old Catholic archbishop Emmanuel Milingo and Maria Sung, a 43-year-old Korean acupuncturist, married in a Unification Church Blessing ceremony, presided over by Moon and his wife. Following his marriage, the archbishop was called to the Vatican by Pope John Paul II, where he was asked not to see his wife anymore and to move to a Capuchin monastery. Sung went on a hunger strike to protest their separation. This attracted much press attention. Milingo is now an advocate of the removal of the requirement for celibacy by priests in the Catholic Church. He is the founder of Married Priests Now!.

The Blessing ceremony figured in the plot of Don DeLillo's 1991 novel Mao II. In 2007, the British television network Channel 4 aired a documentary film by Ulster producer Brian Henry Martin's Doubleband Films, entitled My Big Fat Moonie Wedding, about some of the participants in the 1982 Blessing ceremony of over 2,000 couples which took place in Madison Square Garden.

In his 2009 autobiography, Tahoe Boy: A Journey Back Home, Pat Hickey, a state representative in Nevada and former member of the Unification Church of the United States who took part in the same ceremony, wrote about his experience of being matched to his future wife by Moon.

In 2012, British Producer Firecracker Films produced a television documentary on second-generation Unification Church couples who attended a Blessing ceremony in Korea entitled Married to the Moonies. It was broadcast on Channel 4 and later on TLC in the United States under the title Mass Moon Wedding.

== See also ==
- Arranged marriage
- Blessing
- Collective wedding
- Unification Church
