= Richard O. Collin =

American scholar of international affairs

- Education: University of Oxford
- Occupations: Author, professor of political science at Coastal Carolina University

Richard O. Collin is an American author and scholar of international affairs. He is distinguished professor emeritus of political science at Coastal Carolina University.

== Biography ==
=== Early life and military service ===
Richard Oliver Collin graduated from Canisius University in Buffalo, New York in 1962 with a bachelor's degree in classical languages and history. He began graduate school at Harvard University but was called into active duty in the United States Army. He served as a briefing officer under the Deputy Chief of Staff of Intelligence before becoming an official in the Defense Intelligence Agency. He went on to work as an intelligence officer in Europe and the Middle East.

=== Academic career ===
After his service ended, he received master's degree in political science from University of Kansas before graduating with a PhD in politics at University of Oxford in 1983. He became Palmetto Professor of Politics at Coastal Carolina University, and is currently distinguished professor emeritus of political science.

Collin wrote several works about international affairs, including The De Lorenzo Gambit: The Italian Coup Manqué of 1974 (1975) and The Blunt Instruments: Italy and the Police (1985). In 1990, he co-authored Winter of Fire, about the kidnapping of James L. Dozier by the Red Brigades, with Gordon Freedman. In 2012, he co-wrote Introduction to World Politics with Pamela L. Martin. He also contributed articles about international politics to publications like History Today and The Globalist.

=== Historical novels ===
In 1980, he published the political thriller novel Imbroglio, set in contemporary Italy. He also wrote the historical romance novel Contessa (1994), about the relationship between a peasant woman and an aristocrat during the rise of Mussolini. Publishers Weekly praised the novel's historical accuracy but wrote that Collins' lack of understanding of "human relations or emotional truths" made its story fall flat. His second novel, a spy thriller titled The Man With Many Names (1995), was more well received. It followed disillusioned American intelligence official during the Cold War.

=== Personal life ===
Collin lives in East Yorkshire, England.
