= Expanded Graded Intergenerational Disruption Scale =

Scale measuring how much endangered or developed a language is

The Expanded Graded Intergenerational Disruption Scale (EGIDS), developed by Lewis and Simons (2010) as an expansion of Joshua Fishman's GIDS, measures a language's status in terms of endangerment or development.

The table below shows the various levels on the scale:

Level	Label	Description	UNESCO
0	International	"The language is widely used between nations in trade, knowledge exchange, and international policy."	Safe
1	National	"The language is used in education, work, mass media, and government at the national level."	Safe
2	Provincial	"The language is used in education, work, mass media, and government within major administrative subdivisions of a nation."	Safe
3	Wider Communication	"The language is used in work and mass media without official status to transcend language differences across a region."	Safe
4	Educational	"The language is in vigorous use, with standardization and literature being sustained through a widespread system of institutionally supported education."	Safe
5	Developing	"The language is in vigorous use, with literature in a standardized form being used by some though this is not yet widespread or sustainable."	Safe
6a	Vigorous	"The language is used for face-to-face communication by all generations and the situation is sustainable."	Safe
6b	Threatened	"The language is used for face-to-face communication within all generations, but it is losing users."	Vulnerable
7	Shifting	"The child-bearing generation can use the language among themselves, but it is not being transmitted to children."	Definitely Endangered
8a	Moribund	"The only remaining active speakers of the language are members of the grandparent generation and older."	Severely Endangered
8b	Nearly Extinct	"The only remaining speakers of the language are members of the grandparent generation or older who have little opportunity to use the language."	Critically Endangered
9	Dormant	"The language serves as a reminder of heritage identity for an ethnic community, but no one has more than symbolic proficiency."	Extinct
10	Extinct	"The language is no longer used and no one retains a sense of ethnic identity associated with the language."	Extinct

Fishman's GIDS had levels 1 to 8. EGIDS adds levels 0, 9 and 10, and splits Fishman's levels 6 and 8 into two parts each.

The EGIDS model has become widely known, cited in 911 publications as of May 2025.

This model was developed for spoken languages. It has also been adapted for use with sign languages.
