= Mose Durst =

Mose Durst (born September 5, 1939) is an American author, educator, and the former president of the Unification Church of the United States.

Durst was born in the Williamsburg neighborhood of Brooklyn, New York City, to immigrant parents from Russia. He received a Master's degree and Ph.D. in English literature from the University of Oregon. He taught at Laney College in Oakland, California. In 1972 he converted from Judaism and joined the Unification Church in Oakland, then became a lecturer and a church leader in California. In 1974, he married Korean missionary Yon Soo Lim, and they led the Northern California church together.

In 1980, Durst was appointed by Unification Church founder Sun Myung Moon as the president of the Unification Church of the United States. As church president Durst expanded some of the successful practices of the Northern California church to the national level.

In 1984, Durst expressed regret over misunderstandings between Unification Church members and some members of the Jewish community. He placed blame for this both on the members' "youthful zeal and ignorance" and on the community's "insecurity." That same year he wrote in his autobiography: "Our relations with the Jewish community have been the most painful to me personally. I say this with a heavy heart, since I was raised in the Jewish faith and am proud of my heritage."

Durst currently teaches literature and history to middle school students at the Principled Academy, a Unification Church sponsored school in San Leandro, California, and is the chairman of the school's board. He has published seven books: To Bigotry, No Sanction: Reverend Sun Myung Moon and the Unification Church, Principled Education, Shakespeare’s Plays, and Oakland, California: Towards A Sustainable City, and two children’s books.
