= Language classification =

Grouping of languages into categories

In linguistics, language classification is the grouping of related languages into the same category. There are two main kinds of language classification: genealogical and typological classification.

== Genealogical (or genetic) classification ==
Languages are grouped by diachronic relatedness into language families. In other words, languages are grouped based on how they developed and evolved throughout history, with languages which descended from a common ancestor being grouped into the same language family.

== Typological classification ==
Languages are grouped by their structural and functional features.

== See also ==
- Genetic relationship
- List of language families
