= Carlton Sherwood =

American journalist

Carlton Alex Sherwood (December 16, 1946 – June 11, 2014) was an American journalist who produced the anti-John Kerry film Stolen Honor. Sherwood served on two news teams which were responsible for the award of the Pulitzer Prize and the Peabody Award to their organizations.

After working for the Washington Times, he authored Inquisition: The Persecution and Prosecution of the Reverend Sun Myung Moon, a book about the United States v. Sun Myung Moon which involved Sun Myung Moon, the leader of the same church.

In 1987, the Blinded American Veterans Foundation established the annual Carlton Sherwood Media Award to recognize "both journalistic excellence and those members of the media who have shown special interest in—and dedication to—the needs and concerns of American veterans."

== Early life and career ==
He was born in Camden, New Jersey, in 1946, the son of a naval submarine officer. He enlisted in the US Marine Corps and participated in the United States occupation of the Dominican Republic. He later attended the University of Maryland. His career as a reporter began at the Philadelphia Bulletin in 1968.

== Journalism ==
Sherwood, John M. Hanchette, and William F. Schmick, were responsible for the Gannett News Service winning the 1980 Pulitzer Prize public service gold medal. The award was for a series investigating a fund-raising scandal involving the Pauline Fathers of Doylestown, Pennsylvania and the Vatican's role in the subsequent cover up. It was the first time this award was given to a wire service.

Sherwood also was part of a team of reporters who documented abuse, neglect, and deaths among children, the aged, and the mentally ill cared for by Oklahoma's Department of Human Services. The investigation culminated with articles published by Gannett, a special report produced by Karen Burns and Bill Lichtenstein which aired on the ABC News Magazine 20/20 entitled "Throwaway Kids" and a report, "Oklahoma Shame", which aired on Gannett-owned TV station KOCO in Oklahoma City, Oklahoma. The series was honored with a 1982 Peabody Award.

== Vietnam Veterans Memorial Fund ==
In a November 1983 four-part series for Gannett-owned Washington, D.C. television station WDMV (now WUSA) Channel 9 called Vietnam Memorial: A Broken Promise?.

...he "raised serious questions regarding the financial propriety" of the Vietnam Veterans Memorial Fund, a private organization that raised $9 million to build the wall. Sherwood reported that only $2.6 million had been spent and wanted to know where the rest of the money was.

Bob Doubek, project director for the Fund, said that "It was a hit piece. All of Sherwood's stuff was conjecture, smoke and mirrors." To prevent a lawsuit, the station aired a retraction and donated $50,000 to the Fund. Sherwood was arrested and charged with illegally taping one of the subjects of the report, John P. Wheeler III, chairman of the Fund and special council to the chairman of the SEC. The charges against Sherwood were later dropped. An audit of the Fund by the General Accounting Office, made public in May 1984, concluded that Sherwood's charges regarding the Fund were baseless.

In December, the station refused to air another report by Sherwood criticizing the Fund. Sherwood quit and got a job for The Washington Times at a lower salary. The New York Times headline on this controversy read "Reporter's Project Ruins His Career". (July 17, 1984)

== Inquisition ==
In his book Inquisition: The Persecution and Prosecution of the Reverend Sun Myung Moon, Sherwood concluded:

"The Unification Church, its leaders and followers were and continue to be the victims of the worst kind of religious prejudice and racial bigotry this country has witnessed in over a century. Moreover, virtually every institution we as Americans hold sacred the Congress, the courts, law enforcement agencies, the press, even the U.S. Constitution itself was prostituted in a malicious, oftentimes brutal manner, as part of a determined effort to wipe out this small but expanding religious movement."

In the story "The Resurrection Of Reverend Moon" (January 21, 1992), the PBS television series Frontline produced a copy of a letter addressed to Moon, written by James Gavin, a leader in Moon's Unification Church. Gavin tells Moon he reviewed the "overall tone and factual contents" of the book before publication and suggested revisions. Gavin adds that "Mr. Sherwood has assured me that all this will be done when the manuscript is sent to the publisher." Gavin concludes by telling Moon, "When all of our suggestions have been incorporated, the book will be complete and in my opinion will make a significant impact. ... In addition to silencing our critics now, the book should be invaluable in persuading others of our legitimacy for many years to come."

== Pentagon military analyst program ==
Sherwood was one of 75 members of the Pentagon military analyst program, recruited in 2002 to make appearances in the US media as military analysts while delivering talking points in favor of the Bush administration's invasion of Iraq.

== Stolen Honor ==
During the 2004 presidential campaign, Sherwood wrote and directed the anti-Kerry documentary Stolen Honor, which presented the viewpoints of a number of American Vietnam War veterans who contend that John Kerry's anti-war activities harmed them and depicted Kerry as a traitor. Sherwood told Fox News, "We're all Vietnam combat vets, and we were all slandered and vilified by John Kerry, branded as baby killers." The journalistic standards of this piece were widely called into question. Sinclair Broadcasting planned to broadcast it on the eve of the general election, stating that they considered it to be newsworthy. After the ensuing controversy, Sinclair did not broadcast the film.

Stolen Honor was a project of Sherwood's Red, White and Blue Productions based in Harrisburg, Pennsylvania, whose public affairs are managed by Quantum Communications, a company owned by lobbyist Charles Gerow. In 2000, Gerow ran on the Republican ticket for Congress. In 2003, he was nominated by President Bush to be a Member of the Benjamin Franklin Tercentenary Commission. Gerow acted as publicist for the film.

Sherwood sued Kerry, alleging that he was responsible for Sinclair refusing to air the film and for damage to Sherwood's reputation. Kerry created a legal defense fund called Fund for Truth and Honor, a play on the title of Sherwood's film. The lawsuit was dismissed.

== Republican appointments ==
Sherwood formerly worked for Pennsylvania governor Tom Ridge, whom George W. Bush later appointed as the first Secretary of Homeland Security. Sherwood and Ridge met when Ridge was a Congressman and a key critic of the planned Vietnam Veterans Memorial and Sherwood was reporting negatively on the Memorial Fund. Sherwood served as Executive Vice President and Director of Communications of the WVC3 Group, Inc., an anti-terrorism, security firm headquartered in Reston, VA.

According to his profile on the WVC3 website, Sherwood "served as Special Media Advisor to the Secretary of the Navy during the Reagan Administration."

== Death ==
On June 11, 2014, he died in Philadelphia, Pennsylvania from congestive heart failure at the age of 67.

== Bibliography ==
- Sherwood, Carlton. (1991). Inquisition: The Persecution and Prosecution of the Reverend Sun Myung Moon. Regnery Press. ISBN 0-89526-532-X
- Sherwood, Carlton. (1982). The Wayward Shepherds. Putnam Publishing Group. ISBN 0-87223-786-9.
