= Tongsun Park =

South Korean lobbyist (1935–2024)

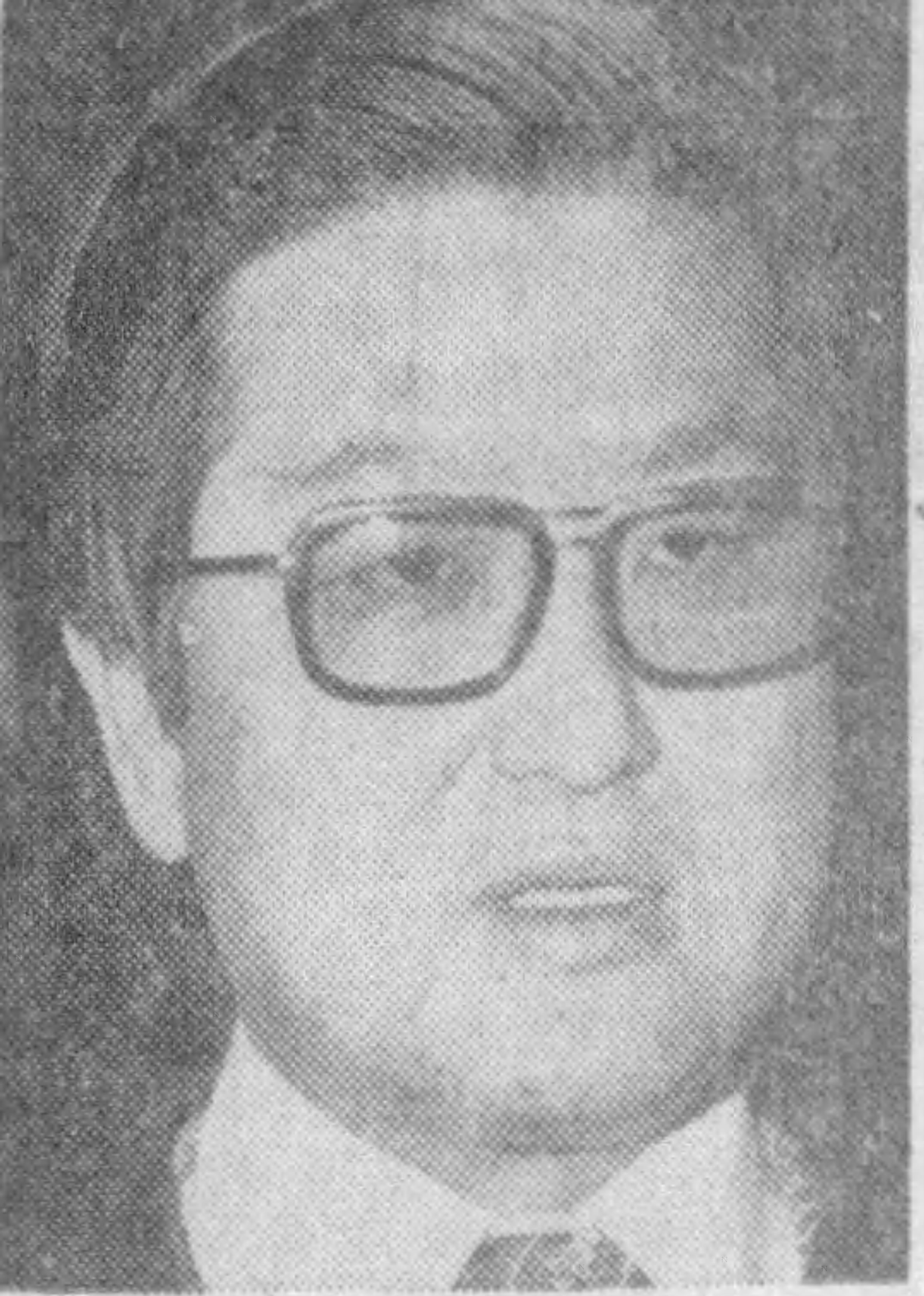
- Park c. 1977
- Born: March 16, 1935; Sunchon, Korea, Empire of Japan
- Died: September 19, 2024 (aged 89); Yongsan, Seoul, South Korea

Korean name
- Hangul: 박동선
- Hanja: 朴東宣
- RR: Bak Dongseon
- MR: Pak Tongsŏn

Tongsun Park (Korean: 박동선; March 16, 1935 – September 19, 2024) was a South Korean lobbyist. He was involved in two political money-related scandals: Koreagate scandal in the 1970s, and the Oil-for-Food Program scandal of the 2000s. Park had a reputation as the "Asian Great Gatsby".

== Koreagate ==
In 1976, Park was charged with bribing members of the U.S. Congress, using money from the South Korean government, in a successful effort to convince the United States government to keep U.S. troops in South Korea. In 1977, he was indicted by a U.S. District Court on thirty-six counts, including bribery, illegal campaign contributions, mail fraud, racketeering, and failure to register as an agent of the Korean Central Intelligence Agency. He avoided a federal trial by testifying to the court in exchange for immunity. His testimony did not have a major impact, though it led to three members of Congress getting reprimanded, and may have convinced Speaker of the House Carl Albert not to seek re-election. One of the implicated former representatives, Otto Passman of Louisiana's 5th congressional district around Monroe, was charged with conspiracy, bribery, acceptance of an illegal gratuity, and income tax evasion. When his trial was moved from Washington, D.C., to Monroe, Passman was quickly acquitted.

== Oil-for-food scandal ==
In 1992, Park was approached by Samir Vincent, an Iraqi-born American who was lobbying unofficially on behalf of the Saddam Hussein regime, to try to create a program that would bypass the United Nations-approved economic sanctions of Iraq that had started in 1991. Park agreed, requesting a payment of US$10 million for his effort, to which Vincent agreed. Park served as a liaison between Vincent and then-United Nations Secretary-General Boutros Boutros-Ghali, with whom Park was friendly. In late 1996, partly as a result of Park's lobbying efforts, the U.N. Oil-for-Food Program began. After 1997, when Kofi Annan became the new secretary-general, the government of Iraq dropped its ties with Park, but by then Park had received about US$2 million in payments.

In 2005 Park was accused of acting as an intermediary with corrupt United Nations officials in the oil-for-food conspiracy orchestrated by Saddam Hussein. His name surfaced as part of investigations into the Oil-for-Food scandal. In July 2006 he was convicted in a U.S. federal court on conspiracy charges. He became the first person convicted through the oil-for-food investigation. On February 22, 2007, he was sentenced to five years in prison. He also was fined $15,000 and required to forfeit $1,200,000. According to the Federal Bureau of Prisons Website, he was released from prison on September 10, 2008. The next day, he left the United States for South Korea.

== Social life ==
In 1966, Park founded The Georgetown Club at 1530 Wisconsin Ave NW. He was known for throwing parties in his social club which is now turned into a private restaurant. By the 1970s, his wealth of expensive homes, worldwide jet travel and a consulting firm (Parkington International Inc.) grew his influence among his connections and friends.

== Personal life and death ==
Born in Sunchon, Korea, Empire of Japan on March 16, 1935, Park died in Yongsan, Seoul on September 19, 2024, at the age of 89.

== See also ==
- Gifts of Deceit
