= Koreagate =

1976 American political scandal

"Koreagate" was an American political scandal in 1976 involving South Korean political figures seeking influence from 10 Democratic members of Congress. The scandal involved the uncovering of evidence that the Korea Central Intelligence Agency (KCIA) was allegedly funneling bribes and favors through South Korean businessman Tongsun Park in an attempt to gain favor and influence in American politics. Reversing Presidential candidate Jimmy Carter's pledge to withdraw American military forces from South Korea is thought to have been one of their primary objectives.

The United States House of Representatives formed the Subcommittee on International Organizations of the Committee on International Relations to investigate the scandal. During the following hearings, Kim Hyong-uk, former director of the KCIA, and various members of the Unification Church of the United States testified to Park's involvement. Park fled the United States and the South Korean government refused to send him back unless he received immunity. Immunity was refused and Park remained in South Korea.

Following the publication of a report detailing the scandal, two members of Congress were charged with crimes: Representative Richard T. Hanna of California and Representative Otto Passman of Louisiana. Passman was acquitted after a trial. Hanna pleaded guilty and served one year in prison. Three other congressmen were reprimanded by the House.

The story was broken by The New York Times reporter Richard Halloran.

== Parties involved ==
Tongsun Park and U.S. Congressman Richard T. Hanna (D-CA) were two of the main actors involved in the Koreagate scandal. Tongsun Park represented the Korean side of the secret agreement, while Richard Hanna was largely responsible for the American side of the deal. According to the agreement, both parties would share the commissions from American rice sales to South Korea and to use them to obtain favorable decisions for Seoul in the United States Congress. Hanna was responsible for aiding Chung Il Kwon and Park in finding effective lobbying techniques, which he did by advising the pair to emulate Taiwanese and Israeli models that had succeeded in the past.

Park was also responsible for providing extra financial incentives to Hanna and other members of Congress, a task made easy by large rice sale commissions. Such financial incentives reportedly ranged from US$100,000 to $200,000 at a time per individual. Some 115 members of Congress were supposedly involved. Speculation also focused on the role of Unification movement founder Sun Myung Moon, former KCIA Director Kim Hyong-uk, and former South Korean Prime Minister Chung Il-kwon.

== Objectives ==
The reasons behind the scandal involved political, social, and financial motivations. Korean leaders, including Tongsun Park and South Korean President Park Chung-hee, were angered with candidate Jimmy Carter's promise to withdraw soldiers from South Korea and felt it was urgent to build support for preserving the United States military presence. The Park government was also concerned with the approval of a substantial package of assistance for South Korea's military modernization programs. Another reason behind the scandal was to repress or counter increasing criticism of Park's illegitimate policies and human rights violations. According to many, the deceitfulness of Park's objectives would ultimately lead to his downfall.

== Consequences ==
The United States Department of State recognized the illegal aspects of Tongsun Park's action in 1970 and informed the Korean embassy in Washington that such activities were problematic. Former United States Ambassador to the Republic of Korea William Porter tried to persuade President Park and Chung Il Kwon that Tongsun Park should have to return to South Korea, but to no avail. Later, William Porter described the United States response as "greatly pessimistic" because the United States government did not want to denounce South Korea when it was assisting in the Vietnam War. Following the replacement of William Porter by Philip Habib as ambassador to South Korea, punishment for Tongsun Park's unethical activities was increasingly pursued. Habib attempted to force Park to register as a lobbyist for the South Korean government, but was unsuccessful. In response to his failure, Habib instructed all embassy personnel in South Korea to cut ties with Park and warned several visiting congressmen about his illegal operations, only to be crossed by former Attorney General William Saxbe who warned Park of these actions and his potential prosecution. Shortly after Porter and Habib's attempts to condemn Tongsun Park's actions, Habib accepted another job opportunity which forced him to work abroad for three years, which once again left Park's fate uncertain.

== Diplomatic relations ==
After Koreagate was publicized, political relations between the United States and South Korea became shaky at best. Animosity between the United States and South Korea was further aggravated by mutual misperceptions and procedural disagreements. The United States adopted a legalistic platform and expected South Korea to cooperate with any pending investigations. On the other hand, South Korean officials believed the story had been exaggerated, spun, or even concocted by American journalists. Furthermore, South Korea interpreted American action as arising from an anti-Park conspiracy. Political experts on both sides also suspected that the scandal was being framed in this manner to aid Gerald Ford's election strategy. According to this interpretation, the Ford administration intended to neutralize the Democratic Party's exploitation of Watergate and Ford's pardon of Richard Nixon as issues by linking key Democratic congressmen to the Koreagate operations.

== Aftermath ==
Despite persistent disagreement about extradition between the United States and South Korea, Tongsun Park ultimately came to the United States in April 1978 to testify publicly in a House hearing. During the testimony, Park admitted to disbursing cash to 30 members of Congress. Ten members of Congress were implicated, of whom most decided to resign, while the statute of limitations expired for three. Park was granted full immunity for his testimony. Congressional members Edward Roybal (D-CA), Charles H. Wilson (D-CA) and John J. McFall (D-CA) were censured and reprimanded; Congressman Edward J. Patten (D-NJ) was found not guilty, and Otto Passman (D-LA) was indicted on bribery, conspiracy, illegal gratuities and tax evasion. He was tried in his home district in Monroe, Louisiana and was acquitted. Richard Hanna was convicted and sentenced to six to thirty months in prison. Once in the White House, Carter ultimately decided to maintain the U.S. military presence in South Korea at existing levels.

== See also ==
- Subcommittee on International Organizations of the Committee on International Relations (The "Fraser Committee")
- Unification Church of the United States
- John K. Singlaub

== Bibliography ==
- Boettcher, Robert B.; Gordon Freedman (1980). Gifts of Deceit: Sun Myung Moon, Tongsun Park, and the Korean Scandal. New York: Holt, Rinehart and Winston. ISBN 0-03-044576-0.
- Grossman, Mark. Political Corruption in America: An encyclopedia of scandals, power, and greed (2003) p. 208.
- Lee, Chae-Jin. (2006). A Troubled Peace : U.S Policy And The Two Koreas. Baltimore: Johns Hopkins University Press. ISBN 0-8018-8330-X.
- Staff Writer (November 29, 1976). "Time Magazine : Koreagate on Capitol Hill?". New York: Time in Partnership with CNN.
