= Who Is Guru Maharaj Ji? =

Who is Guru Maharaj Ji?
- Book cover, Paperback ed.
- Author: Charles Cameron, Editor; Rennie Davis, Introduction
- Language: English
- Subject: Guru Maharaj Ji
- Genre: Non-fiction
- Publisher: Bantam Books
- Publication date: November 1973
- Publication place: United States
- Media type: Paperback
- ISBN: 9786134293907
- OCLC: 753466

Who is Guru Maharaj Ji?, published in 1973 by Bantam Books is a non-fiction book about Guru Maharaj Ji, now known as Prem Rawat. Edited by Charles Cameron, the book claims to be an "authentic authorized story", and was written when Maharaj Ji was aged 15. The initial printing was of 125,000 copies. A Spanish-language edition was also published in 1975, as Quién es Guru Maharaj Ji.

In the introduction, Rennie Davis, a public spokesperson for Maharaj Ji at the time, refers to Maharaj Ji as "the greatest event in history and we sleep through it" and goes on to say "If we knew who he was we would crawl across America on our hands and knees to rest our heads at his feet." Even less ambiguously, the back cover asks "Why do more than six million people around the world claim he is the greatest incarnation of God that ever trod the face of this planet?"

Who Is Guru Maharaj Ji? was also the title of a 60-minute colour film produced by Shri Hans Productions, which gave some background on the Guru and his followers.

== Cited in secondary works ==
The 2000 book Pluralism Comes of Age: Religion in Twentieth-century America, by Lippy, cites Cameron's Who is Guru Maharaj Ji? for information regarding Maharaj Ji and the Divine Light Mission, along with James V. Downton's Sacred Journeys: The Conversion of Young Americans to Divine Light Mission, and Maharaj Ji's own book of quotations, The Living Master. Gray's Adam and Eve and the City cites the work, in a section where she analyzes new religious movements, Tucker cites the book in the context of the New Age movement, and Marc Galanter cites the book in the context of analyzing cults.

The book is cited in a sociological context, in the work Religious Change and Continuity. Sutton cited the book, in the context of the history of communes in America, also citing Downton's Sacred Journeys as a source. Mangalwadi used the book as a source in his discussion of Gurus.

Who is Guru Maharaj Ji? is also cited by Greenfield's The Spiritual Supermarket, which discussed what Greenfield saw as the permeation of media related to specifically to Maharaj Ji that surrounded his lifestyle. Burghart cited the work, analyzing the effect of a new culture on a foreign religion. The book has also been cited by religious scholars writing in other languages, including Holm, and Hummel. Irving Hexham includes the book in his index to Cults, Sects and New Religions, and puts the work in the context of Neo-Hinduism.

== Other mentions ==
According to the book Rolling Stone: The Seventies, copies of Who is Guru Maharaj Ji were piled in stacks on the floor and on tables at the Divine Light Mission's "Millennium '73" event, which honored Maharaj Ji
