= Millennium '73 =

1973 festival in Houston, Texas

Poster announcing "Millennium '73"

Millennium '73 was a three-day festival held on November 8–10, 1973 at the Astrodome in Houston, Texas, United States, by the Divine Light Mission (DLM). It featured Prem Rawat, then known as Guru Maharaj Ji, a 15-year-old guru and the leader of a fast-growing new religious movement. Organizers billed the festival as the most significant event in human history which would usher in a thousand years of peace.

The festival's official schedule described the three evening addresses by Guru Maharaj Ji as the highlights of the event. Big-band music, rock bands, religious songs, choral works, a dance performance and speeches by other DLM leaders filled the program from noon to 10 pm. Media events included press conferences and an impromptu debate.

Millennium '73 received wide publicity. Rennie Davis, a prominent anti-war activist and member of the Chicago Seven, helped draw attention to the event as a spokesman for the DLM. Notable journalists attended, some of them acquaintances of Davis from the New Left. It was later described by some scholars and journalists as among the major events of 1973 and the 1970s, the high point of Guru Maharaj Ji's popularity, and the most important development in the American DLM's history.

Attendance was estimated from 10,000 to 35,000, compared to the projected 100,000. Many scholars and journalists generally depicted the event as a disappointment. That, along with other factors including a large debt, led to changes in the DLM's structure, management and message. The following year the movement split into branches headed by Maharaj Ji in the West, and his mother and brother Bal Bhagwan Ji in India.

== Before the event ==
=== Background ===
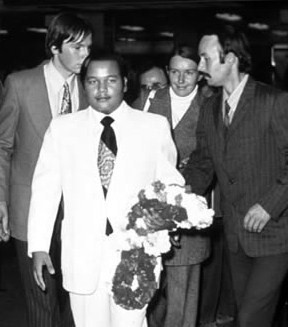
Guru Maharaj Ji arriving in France on July 14, 1971

Hans Ji Maharaj, who taught secret meditation techniques called "Knowledge", founded the Divine Light Mission (DLM) in India in 1960. Hans Ji, called "Guru Maharaj Ji", died six years later and was succeeded as spiritual leader and Perfect Master by his eight-year-old youngest son, who adopted his father's title. As the young Guru Maharaj Ji was a minor, his mother, Mata Ji, and the eldest son, Bal Bhagwan Ji, managed the DLM's affairs. By 1971, when the 13-year-old Guru Maharaj Ji made his first tours of the United Kingdom and United States, the Indian DLM claimed over five million members (known as "premies"). Within two years the DLM had as many as 50,000 members in the US, with thousands more in the UK and other countries and as many as six million in India. Most of the Western followers were young people from the 1960s counterculture.

The DLM celebrated three annual festivals, the largest of which, "Hans Jayanti", commemorated Hans Ji Maharaj's birthday on November 9. The Hans Jayanti festivals held in India in the early 1970s were well-attended, attracting audiences of up to a million people, including Westerners. Mata Ji and the 22-year-old Bal Bhagwan Ji decided that the 1973 Hans Jayanti should be held in the United States; it was the first to be held outside India.

The movement invested all of its resources in the event, with an overall budget of close to US$1,000,000, including $75,000 to rent the Astrodome and $100,000 for publicity. The DLM paid for many of the international charter flights that brought followers to Houston. DLM members were under pressure to contribute money to support the event. Organizers invited hundreds of reporters from all over the country, hoping to achieve positive media exposure for Maharaj Ji.

=== Millenarian appeal ===
In the late 1960s and early 1970s, many people in the US, especially hippies, believed that the world was on the verge of a new era, the Age of Aquarius. This new age was expected to be characterized by peace and love, harmony and understanding. By the late autumn of 1973 there was an "apocalyptic chill in the air", as headlines dealt with the Vietnam War, the Watergate scandal, the Agnew resignation, a war in the Middle East, an energy crisis, mass murders in Houston and California, and UFO sightings across the South.

Sociologist James V. Downton wrote that the millenarian appeal of the DLM prior to the festival sprang from a belief that Guru Maharaj Ji was the Lord, and that a new age of peace would begin under his leadership. These hopes appealed to the counterculture youth of the time, who were disillusioned with earlier attempts at political and cultural revolution and who were turning their aspirations in a spiritual direction. Downton describes these aspirations as encouraging millennial beliefs within the DLM, including the "psychological trappings of surrender and idealization." He states the guru's mother, whose satsang was "full of references to his divine nature", aided these beliefs, as did the guru himself, "for letting others cast him in the role of the Lord." Maharaj Ji's appeal to followers to give up beliefs and concepts did not prevent them "from adopting a fairly rigid set of ideas about his divinity and the coming of a new age."

In a meeting with members, DLM President Bob Mishler denied that the event would start the millennium and said they called it "Millennium '73" because the word "millennium" evoked the "vision of one peaceful world based on spiritual values".

=== Promotion ===
The Mission's most prominent member was anti-war activist and Chicago Seven defendant Rennie Davis, who had first met Guru Maharaj Ji in February 1973. Davis was appointed vice president of the organization a short time later and served as general coordinator for the Millennium festival. His conversion was the topic of numerous newspaper articles, as it reportedly shook the New Left from coast to coast. An energetic promoter of his new guru and of Millennium '73, Davis traveled across the United States on a 21-city tour, speaking to what he said were about a million people a day through radio and television interviews. He told people that Guru Maharaj Ji was the solution to civilization's problems. Davis was not always well-received, particularly by his former comrades in the peace movement (one Berkeley newspaper had the headline "Rennie Unites Left – Against Him"), and was heckled at some of his appearances. The Chicago Seven retrial was underway in the fall of 1973, and the judge gave Davis a dispensation to attend the festival. Several associates of Davis from the left also attended, some as journalists.

A two-week, eight-city, 500-person tour, called "Soul Rush", was organized to promote Millennium '73. At a stop in Washington, D.C., premies (DLM members) gathered in front of the White House and invited President Richard Nixon to attend the festival and receive Knowledge. One reporter for the Village Voice who traveled in the tour wrote that they had little press coverage and poor attendance but showed obvious energy, and that the tour itself went remarkably smoothly with expressions of love among the members. At each city, the touring group and local premies paraded in the morning, and a drama troupe performed in the afternoon. The main event was the free evening performance by Blue Aquarius, a 50 to 60-piece band led by Bhole Ji, Maharaj Ji's 20-year-old brother, referred to as the "Lord of Music" by Davis and others. The band was composed of professional and amateur musicians who donated their efforts, and its leading member was drummer Geoff Bridgeford, formerly of the Bee Gees. It went on to anchor the Houston festival.

Press releases and a festival poster announced that the event would mark the beginning of "a thousand years of peace for people who want peace", the idea being that peace could come to the world as individuals experienced inner peace. A flyer said, "Now the turning point in human civilization is here. ... The Dawn of the New Age." In a letter to premies inviting them attend the festival, which had only been celebrated in India up to that point, Guru Maharaj Ji said, "This year the most Holy and significant event in human history will take place in America". The "Call to Millennium" announcement published in the DLM publication And It Is Divine said that "Guru Maharaj Ji has proved to us that an age of peace is possible, now, ... Peace is needed. And peace shall be obtained. ... [Guru Maharaj Ji] will present to the world a plan for putting peace into effect."

=== Expectations and rumors ===
Official DLM literature predicted the dawn of a new age of peace, the Age of Aquarius, and some followers expected dramatic change or even the Second Coming of Jesus. In a letter to premies inviting them to attend the festival, Guru Maharaj Ji said, "This is a festival not for you or me. It is for the whole world and maybe the whole universe." He urged them to support the festival, saying, "Isn't it about time you all get together and help me bring peace to this Earth?" Rennie Davis promised that a practical plan for world peace would be revealed.

Sociologist Thomas Pilarzyk wrote that devotees made "bizarre, 'cultic'" predictions, and suggested that their excitement validated the significance of the event. A member remarked that even normally realistic followers were swayed by the collective fantasies. Sophia Collier, a teenaged member who later left the movement and published a memoir, said that a minority of members, mostly limited to Houston, became victims of a "Millennium Fever" promoted chiefly by Bal Bhagwan Ji. The majority of the premies repeated Bal Bhagwan Ji's ideas out of astonishment, but some actually believed him. Journalists noted that some followers perceived the predicted appearance of Comet Kohoutek as an omen, as a spaceship on its way to Houston, or as the return of the Star of Bethlehem.

A frequently repeated prediction, attributed to Maharaj Ji, was that the Astrodome would levitate. Davis and others made often-reported predictions, repeated in half-jest, that extraterrestrials would attend the festival. Bal Bhagwan Ji is said to have predicted the festival would be preceded by earthquakes in New York and Denver, along with a dive in the stock markets. Sociologist Downton wrote that there were runaway expectations about attendance. Public predictions of attendance grew larger: from 100,000 to 144,000 (the number foretold in the Book of Revelation for the Second Coming), to 200,000 and even 400,000. (The capacity of the Astrodome was 66,000.) Davis told one audience that millions would attend.

Bob Mishler, the founding president of the DLM in the United States, later said he had tried to slow the growing expectations. He said he had only expected 20,000–25,000 and that he toured the country explaining to members that the festival would be significant because of what happened there, not because of the number of attendees. He said he tried to remind them that the aim was to establish peace on Earth, not to travel to another planet.

== Festival ==
=== Rainbow Brigade ===
During the summer prior to the festival, 380 followers worked full-time in Houston preparing for the event. Known as the "Rainbow Brigade", their motto was "Work Is Worship". The total staff for the festival eventually numbered 4,000. Fifteen hundred festival volunteers stayed at a former Coca-Cola plant, renamed the "Peace Plant" for the occasion, where they slept on folded blankets over the concrete floor. Another thousand stayed at the Rainbow Inn motel. Reporters wrote that the volunteers maintained a tight and professional operation, and showed the egalitarian obedience of the Israeli Army or a monastery. One reporter wrote that he never saw a premie lose his temper. Another noted that the workers seemed to be "model human beings, perhaps even on their way to becoming the 'new evolutionary species' that they claim will establish heaven on earth".

=== World Peace Corps ===
The World Peace Corps (WPC), headed by Maharaj Ji's 19-year-old youngest brother, Raja Ji, was the DLM's security force at the event. Raja Ji said its job was "to make sure that whatever is happening, happens correctly". One of the security group's main tasks was keeping followers away from the guru. Journalists reported being pushed around and threatened by the mostly English guards. The guards were seen by one reporter as exemplifying "the inevitable violence of any millennial sect hell-bent on abstract purity and infinite happiness". The World Peace Corps' name was called doublespeak and compared to the big lie. An observer was quoted as saying, "These people were mad with a sense of divinity-authorized power. It was like descending into the ninth ring of hell."

=== And It Is Divine special issue ===
The DLM's magazine And It Is Divine published a special edition for the event. The 78-page magazine, with Maharaj Ji listed as the editor-in-chief, included an invitation to the event, the festival program, and a history of the festival. One article profiled the "Holy Family" (Guru Maharaj Ji, his mother, and three older brothers), illustrated with individual portraits and a group photograph. The festival invitation said, "Three years ago, at the 1970 Hans Jayanti, the present Guru Maharaj Ji proclaimed he would establish world peace. This year at Millennium '73 he will set in motion his plan to bring peace on earth ... for a thousand years." An article compared the nations of the world to the coyote in the Roadrunner cartoons who, blinded by the prize he is chasing, runs off the end of the cliff and falls.

An unsigned article, titled "Prophets of the Millennium", referred to prophecies from the Book of Isaiah, Hindu scripture, American Indians, Edgar Cayce, Jeane Dixon, and others. The article noted that prophecies tend to come true, that there are many predictions that the savior will be a child or will come from the East. It concluded by asking whether Guru Maharaj Ji might be that prophesied "Great Savior".

=== Hobby Airport arrival ===
The arrival of Guru Maharaj Ji and his family on Wednesday, November 7, 1973, was the first big event of the festival. A crowd of 3,000 young, clean-cut followers waited for two or three hours at Hobby Airport, a delay that annoyed impatient reporters. While they waited, premies covered Maharaj Ji's emerald-green Rolls-Royce with flowers. A follower told a reporter they wanted him to have the best because he is like a king, as opposed to Christ who was like a beggar. After his late arrival, Maharaj Ji spoke for a few minutes, saying to the assembled,

It's really fantastic and really beautiful to see you here, the Millennium program will start tomorrow and it'll really be fantastic, it'll be incredible ... and soon people will get together and finally understand who is God. ... There's so much trouble in the world, Watergate is not only in America, it exists everywhere.

The premies were smiling and radiant, a state they called "blissed out". One reporter said that to "look at a blissed-out premie is to peer into an empty house through spotless windows". The phrase "blissed out" was used in many reports of the festival, even in their titles, which are cited by the Oxford English Dictionary for the phrase's first uses.

The Rawat family stayed in the Astrodome's six-bedroom, $2,500 Celestial Suite. Rennie Davis commented on the cosmic appropriateness of the names of the suite and of the master bedroom, and of the faucets shaped like swans (the guru's symbol). Davis said that the Astrodome was built for the festival, a sentiment which an Astrodome manager said was shared by every religious group that held an event there.

=== Stage, signs and effects ===
The interior of the Astrodome (picture from 2004, after the removal of the Astrolite sign)

Architect and follower Larry Bernstein said he designed the stage not for the audience in the Astrodome, but for the TV cameras. The 35 feet (11 m)-high multilevel set fit easily at one end of the field under the dome's 300 feet (91 m) roof. The set, made of glowing white Plexiglas, was described as striking in appearance, yet, it was reportedly dwarfed by the vast size of the Astrodome. At the highest level was the guru's throne. Lower levels held the "Holy Family", the mahatmas (sometimes described as the priests or apostles of the DLM), and the Blue Aquarius band led by Bhole Ji Rawat, who wore a silver-sequined suit while conducting. Red carpeting covered the AstroTurf.

Projected on huge white screens above the set were rainbows and images of the turmoil of the 1960s. The Astrolite, Astrodome's enormous electronic signboard, flashed animated fireworks (the same that were shown during ballgames), representations of Maharaj Ji, and a variety of slogans, scriptural citations, and announcements:

- Sugar is Sweet/So are You/Guru Maharaj Ji
- The Holy Breath will fill this place/And you will be baptized in Holy Breath
- All premies interested in doing/Propagation in Morocco please contact/Millennium Information at the Royal Coach Inn
- Happiness is not in the material world. It is the property of God
- Attention, Attention/Please do not run and dance/Thank you, Guru Maharaj Ji
- Realize heaven on earth
- You will sit in your assigned places, please

=== Program ===
Each day's program opened and closed with the singing of Aarti, called an "ancient devotional song of praise to the Perfect Master". According to reports before the festival, its three themes were to be "Who is Guru Maharaj Ji", "Guru Maharaj Ji is Here", and "The Messiah Has Come", though the official schedule in November had a different list.

Maharaj Ji watched the proceedings on closed-circuit television in his suite, and sent his bodyguard down with a can of pink foam confetti to spray the crowd on his behalf, reported as an example of lila, or divine play. In addition to the main program, mahatmas were conducting initiations into Knowledge at local ashrams, and the guru and his family were offering darshan, or holy presence, to initiates.

Day 1 – "What is a Perfect Master?"

The first day of the festival was Thursday, November 8, 1973. The program listed the topic of the day as "What is a Perfect Master?" It started at noon with an oratorio composed for the occasion by Erika Anderson. Rennie Davis opened the program by telling the audience that, "All I can say is, honestly, very soon now, every single human being will know the one who was waited for by every religion of all times has actually come" The masters of ceremony were Joan Apter, an early US convert and one of Maharaj Ji's secretaries, and Charles Cameron, one of the guru's earliest converts in the UK and editor of Who Is Guru Maharaj Ji? Cameron told stories of previous Perfect Masters. After that came a pageant reenacting scenes from the life of Jesus Christ. In the afternoon Bal Bhagwan Ji delivered a spiritual discourse, or satsang.

Rhythm and blues musician Eric Mercury performed during the dinner interval. Stax Records had negotiated an agreement with the DLM to make a recording of the event in exchange for showcasing Mercury, one of their new acts. They had already released an album titled "Blue Aquarius" in 1973 that was on sale at the event. Mercury, a Canadian of African ancestry and the only non-member who performed, played before an audience of 5,000 or fewer. Stax recorded the performance and Mercury said at a press conference that he would give 50 percent of his royalties from the album to the DLM. He later told a reporter that while he was interested in the message initially, he was put off by the pressure to join for what he perceived as an effort to gain ethnic diversity.

Following Mercury was a speech by Bob Mishler and then an hour-long set by the Blue Aquarius orchestra. The highlight of the evening was a satsang by Maharaj Ji:

You want to be the richest man in the world? I can make you rich. I have the only currency that doesn't go down ... People think I'm a smuggler. You betcha I am. I smuggle peace and truth from one country to another. This currency is really rich. But if you think I'm a smuggler then Jesus Christ was a smuggler and so was Lord Krishna and Mohammed.

Maharaj Ji said to the crowd, "Try it, you'll like it." (This was the catchphrase from a 1971 ad campaign for Alka-Seltzer.)

Day 2 – "The Perfect Master is Here"

The second day of the festival, Friday, November 9, had the theme of "The Perfect Master is Here". It featured speeches by mahatmas and by Maharaj Ji's mother, Mata Ji. The Divine Light Dance Ensemble performed a dance piece, Krishna Lila, noted for being well-choreographed. Music included another choral composition by Erika Anderson, another long set by Blue Aquarius, and a performance by the Apostles, a devotional rock band. Maharaj Ji wore a red Krishna robe and later put on a jeweled crown of Krishna, the "Crown of Crowns for the King of Kings". His satsang that night included this story:

Imagine if you wanted a Superman comic real bad. And you go all over asking people if they've got one. You go to all the bookstores and to all the kids in the colleges, and all the people on the streets and no one has one anywhere. And you're real depressed and you're sitting there in the park and this little kid comes up and says "Hey man, how'd you like a Superman comic." And you say, "G'wan. You don't have one." And this kid pulls it from out of his shirt and it is a genuine; a gen-u-ine Superman comic: and you look at it and say, "Hey man; this must be very expensive", and he says, "No, take it, it's yours. It's free." And you don't believe him but then you take it. He just gives it to you. Well if you can imagine that, you can imagine what Knowledge would mean to you.

Day 3 – "World Assemblage to Save Humanity"

The third and last day of the festival, Saturday, November 10, was called a "World Assemblage to Save Humanity". A talk by another brother, Raja Ji, and more performances by Blue Aquarius and the Apostles filled the schedule. Plans for the Divine United Organization and the Divine City were announced. Rennie Davis gave a speech that one reporter called the oratorical high point of the festival. "I tell you now that it is springtime on this earth!" Jerry Rubin, a co-defendant in the Chicago Seven trial, said he had never heard Davis sound more dangerous.

The climax of the event was the final satsang by Maharaj Ji, in which he laid out his plan for peace. According to one reporter his basic message was, "You want peace? Give me a try. Let me have a try. I'll establish peace. It's a simple deal." One analogy by Maharaj Ji that several reporters noted compared the techniques of Knowledge to a fuel filter:

The thing is that this life is a big car, and inside the car there is a big engine. And in the engine there is a carburetor, which is hooked up to a fuel line. In some cars, before the fuel line hits the carburetor, there is a thing called a filter that makes sure the fuel going into the carburetor is pure. So in this life, the filter for our minds is the Knowledge, and if we are not being filtered properly, many dirty particles enter our minds and eventually the whole engine is destroyed.

After the satsang he was presented by grateful premies with a golden sculpture of a swan and a marble plaque depicting a lion and a lamb lying down together. The event concluded after a short performance by the Blue Aquarius orchestra. After the program, volunteers hurried to clear the field of the stage and carpeting in time for a football game the next afternoon.

== Attendance ==
Notable members attending the event included Sophia Collier, Rennie Davis, and Timothy Gallwey. Journalists, writers, observers, and guests included James Downton, Marjoe Gortner, Robert Greenfield, Paul Krassner, Bob Larson, Wavy Gravy, Annie Leibovitz, Jerry Rubin, Robert Scheer, Michael Shamberg, John Sinclair, and Loudon Wainwright III. Overall attendance was predominantly estimated at 20,000, with other estimates ranging from 10,000 to 35,000. Chartered planes brought followers from several dozen countries; with designated seating sections for attendees from France, Sweden, India, Spain, and even, as a joke, Mars. In addition to the seats reserved for the ETs within the stadium, a corner of the parking lot was set aside for their ship. Bal Bhagwan Ji reportedly told a follower who asked about the low attendance that there were actually 150,000 beings there.

The premies were reported to be cheerful and friendly. Unlike most youth gatherings of the era, there was no scent of marijuana or tobacco, only incense. Though the movement's membership included former street people, radicals, and drug users, they now appeared clean-cut and neatly dressed. Male followers wore suits and ties, and women wore long dresses. When Maharaj Ji was present, his followers raised their arms towards him, and chanted "Bolie Shri Satgurudev Maharaj ki jai!" ("All praise to the Perfect Master, giver of life"). One reporter called them cheerleaders. Four journalists compared it to scenes at the Nuremberg stadium.

Four hundred parents of DLM members sat in a special section high above the floor of the dome. Many parents appreciated Maharaj Ji for rehabilitating their prodigal children. One mother explained how her son had stopped using drugs and was happier after receiving Knowledge, and that she had been initiated, too. A follower said some of the parents looked a little embarrassed.

=== Opposition groups ===
Local Baptist churches took out a full-page newspaper advertisement warning of false prophets. A group of Christians stationed themselves outside the Astrodome and prayed. Hare Krishna, Jesus Freaks, Children of God and the Jews for Jesus protested loudly and sought converts. Members of the Christian Information Committee drove from Berkeley, California. A Christian evangelical anti-cult group, Spiritual Counterfeits Project, had its origin in the event.

The picketing groups fought with each other, harassed attendees, and vandalized cars owned by DLM members. Organizers called the police to clear Hare Krishna protesters who were blocking the arena entrances and as many as thirty-one of them were arrested for disorderly conduct. The Hare Krishnas protested that Maharaj Ji was being called an incarnation of Krishna, while Christians protested that Maharaj Ji was a false messiah and the Antichrist. In response, Maharaj Ji said at one of his satsangs, "They must be drunk. When the real Antichrist comes they won't even recognize him. He'll be too professional."

== Media coverage ==
Between fifty and three hundred reporters covered the event. It received extensive coverage from the print media, though not the national television news coverage that organizers expected (there had been predictions that Walter Cronkite would cover it live). The New York Times and Rolling Stone sent two reporters each, and it was also covered by The Washington Post, the Chicago Tribune, the Los Angeles Times, the Los Angeles Free Press, the Detroit Free Press, the Village Voice, The Rag of Houston, and the Houston Chronicle. Magazines covering the festival included Time, Newsweek, the New York Review of Books, Ramparts Magazine, Creem, Texas Monthly, The Realist, Crawdaddy, Playboy, Penthouse, and Oui. Journalists Marilyn Webb, Robert Scheer, Robert Greenfield, and Ken Kelley had been following or even living with the DLM for weeks or months prior to the festival.

KPFT-FM, a local progressive radio station, covered the event: Paul Krassner, John Sinclair, Jeff Nightbyrd, and Jerry Rubin were co-anchors. They reportedly mocked the festival and its attendees. Not realizing this, the festival organizers piped the signal throughout the Astrodome until the nature of the coverage became apparent. Loudon Wainwright III, who made a guest appearance on KPFT, later said that Maharaj Ji partly inspired his song "I am the Way".

Top Value Television (TVTV) chose the Millennium '73 festival as a topic for a documentary, titled Lord of the Universe. TVTV was a documentary production company that had just received acclaim for its groundbreaking piece on the 1972 Republican National Convention. They used Portapak cameras and newly developed recording technology that allowed them to shoot handheld video of broadcast quality. Two teams followed a member and the Soul Rush tour prior to the event. Led by producer Michael Shamberg, five camera teams recorded 80 hours of video at the festival itself. Chicago Seven codefendant Abbie Hoffman, who did not attend, provided commentary. Premie Sophia Collier wrote that the TVTV crew seemed to start filming whenever someone said anything fanatical or ill-conceived. PBS television stations across the US broadcast the documentary in the spring of 1974 and again in the summer. The documentary went on to win a DuPont-Columbia Award in 1974 for excellence in broadcast journalism.

Reporters were angered and alienated by their treatment. Rules and passes for media access were changed daily with no apparent logic. A female reporter wrote of being shoved a few times by WPC members. Another reporter said the DLM assigned him a guide to accompany him at all times to answer questions. Robert Scheer later wrote of being told by a press agent that the Venusians were landing and he could be the first to cover them if he hurried out to the parking lot. According to Collier, journalists found the event to be a confusing jumble of poorly expressed ideas. One reporter complained of the lack of content.

The national press was more concerned with finances and organization than with "feeling the Knowledge", by one account. Collier complained about the coverage in general and especially about an article by the Village Voice's Marilyn Webb that featured her, saying that the article was inaccurate and misrepresented her beliefs. Davis told reporters that he was aware of the perceptions of the event by outsiders, and admitted that the huge stage, flashing lights, and a kid giving parables about cars did not make for a good show.

In June 1974, the DLM's Divine Times newspaper printed an analysis of the press coverage. It criticized articles written about the festival, saying they portrayed Maharaj Ji as materialistic whose followers were misguided. The only article it approved of was in a children's magazine. The review also admitted that the DLM had made a number of mistakes and that the press relations were improper and inept. Carole Greenberg, head of DLM Information Services, said, "We took something subtle and sacred and tried to market it to the public." She said the press had done the movement a favor by holding up a mirror that showed "the garbage we gave them". The article went on to say that the greatest botch was Guru Maharaj Ji's press conference.

=== Press conference ===
Maharaj Ji's press conference, hastily arranged for the morning of Friday, November 9, was noted for leaving the reporters frustrated and hostile because of what they described as flippant, manipulative, and arrogant answers, and because of an effort to pack the room with supporters. Several dozen followers, mostly foreign, jostled reporters, asked long and complimentary questions, and shouted "Boli Shri" or "Jai Satchitanand" following the answers. According to the Divine Times some of the reporters acted like "district attorneys interrogating a hostile witness". A reporter from Newsweek complained that the evasive responses reminded him of a recent Watergate press conference with White House Press Secretary Ron Ziegler, while another observer called it "Nixonian".

Question: Are you the messiah?
Answer: Please do not presume that. I am a humble servant of God, trying to establish peace in the world.
Q: Why is there such a great contradiction between what you say about yourself and what your followers say about you?
A: Well, why don't you do me a favor ... why don't you go to the devotees and ask their explanation about it?
Q: It's hard for some people to understand how you personally can live so luxuriously in your several homes and your Rolls-Royces
A: That life that you call luxurious ain't luxurious at all, because if any other person gets the same life I get, he's gonna blow apart in a million pieces in a split of a second. ... People have made Rolls-Royce a heck of a car, only it's a piece of tin with a V8 engine which probably a Chevelle Concourse has.
Q: Why don't you sell it and give food to people?
A: What good would it do. All that's gonna happen is they will need more and I don't have other Rolls-Royces. I will sell everything and I'll walk and still they will be hungry.
Q: Guru, what happened to the reporter in Detroit who was badly beaten by your followers? [Following the question, Maharaj Ji's press aide tried to change the subject, accusing the questioner of hogging the floor.]
A: I think you ought to find out what happened to everything.

The conference, which lasted nearly an hour, ended shortly after descending into a shambles when reporters pressed for information about the Detroit incident, in which a reporter who had thrown a pie at Maharaj Ji a few months prior was subsequently beaten by two DLM members. As of 1976, it was Maharaj Ji's last press conference.

=== Krassner–Davis debate ===
Paul Krassner repeatedly challenged Rennie Davis to a debate and Davis finally agreed. It was held in the adjoining Astrohall convention center on the third day, Saturday, November 10, and attended by 30 reporters. The question was, "Resolved: That Davis has copped out to turn kids away from social responsibility to personal escape". Ken Kelley was the moderator and KPFT-FM broadcast it live. Repeating accusations he had been making through the summer, Krassner said that the movement was part of a CIA-directed conspiracy. He called it a neo-Fascist discipline, said Maharaj Ji was a mystic hired to seduce the youth movement into oblivion, and called him the spiritual equivalent of Mark Spitz. He asked, "Did the Maharaj Ji give Richard Nixon a secret contribution?", to which Davis replied, "Yes – he gave Richard Nixon his life."

Davis said the most important point was that "the Lord is on the planet and he has the secret of life", and that Maharaj Ji would lead "the most serious revolution ever to take place in the history of the world". He said the main battleground now is "the struggle between the mind and the soul" in each person. Reporters said that Davis stayed poised while Krassner heckled.

== Afterwards ==
Two sociologists described Millennium '73 as the youth culture event of the year. Journalists listed it among the notable events of the 1970s. Indian writer Vishal Mangalwadi called the festival the zenith of Maharaj Ji's popularity. The festival did not live up to expectations of establishing peace or world transformation. According to reports, the Astrodome did not levitate, no UFOs landed, and no ETs attended. Journalists and scholars called the festival a dismal failure, a fiasco, a major setback, a disastrous rally, a great disappointment, and a "depressing show unnoticed by most". According to James T. Richardson, the event left the movement "in dire financial straits and bereft of credibility". Religious scholar Robert S. Ellwood wrote that Maharaj Ji's "meteoric career collapsed into scandal and debt" after the event.

Maharaj Ji gave no public indication that he was disappointed, although one reporter said he appeared to be nonplussed by the turnout. He remarked privately on how perfect it was and called the event fantastic. Three months after the event Davis said that it was significant despite the low attendance, noting that only a small number of people were at the Sermon on the Mount or the Last Supper. In a June 1974 interview, Mishler said that the love which filled the Astrodome was the beginning of the human race, and that only those who came to it with expectations were disappointed.

Some members expected world transformation and there were many reports of members being disappointed. According to sociologists Foss and Larkin, some members saw the failure to meet expectations as another example of lila. Downton, who attended the festival, said the followers tried to find nice things to say about the event but that it appeared to him they were trying to hide ruined dreams. One member said that the excitement was over and that followers could not believe that the world had not changed. A member from an Orthodox Jewish background was disenchanted and began to doubt that Maharaj Ji held all the answers, according to his sister's memoir. Janet McDonald, an African American woman attending Vassar College, said that her "faith was brutally dashed to bits" at the festival because of its failure to meet her expectations of miracles and by her embarrassment at lining up for hours to kiss the white-socked foot of Mata Ji. She left the movement soon after. Sophia Collier said that she woke up on the bottling plant floor the next morning wondering why she was there, though she decided to try to repair the movement's public image.

=== Debt ===
The DLM leadership had expected that a huge attendance would be followed by generous donations. Millennium '73 was free, unlike other DLM festivals that charged sizable fees. Despite fundraising before the event, lower than expected attendance and mismanagement left the DLM in serious debt, estimated at $682,000. Individual members also carried debts incurred for traveling expenses.

The festival was financed with short-term credit that began coming due right after the event. Seeking payment, creditors, including the Astrodome management, pursued the DLM and repossessed property belonging to the mission. By mid-1974, NBC reported that about $150,000 was still owed and that 25 vendors had received no payments at all. Members of the DLM took on extra work in order to raise money at Maharaj Ji's suggestion. The debt forced the sale or closure of the DLM's printing and other businesses, the temporary shutdown of their newspaper and magazine, the disbanding of Blue Aquarius, and the shelving of new initiatives. In 1976, a DLM spokesman said that the debt had been reduced to $80,000 and that the mission was on a sound financial footing.

=== Impact ===
Thomas Pilarzyk described the festival as the "most important development" in the American movement's history. James V. Downton opined that the movement ultimately failed in achieving its millennial dream of world peace. The failure to meet expectations, along with the debt and bad press, led to significant changes in the movement.

Scholars describe 1973 as the peak year of the movement, or mention a significant drop in new followers. However, Roger E. Olson wrote that "the movement continued to attract large numbers of mainly counterculture followers" despite the disappointments. The financial crisis required retrenchment and reorganization. After the festival, Maharaj Ji began taking greater responsibility in the movement; he took administrative control of the DLM's US branch within a month of turning 16. The following year he got married and became an emancipated minor. Disagreements between Maharaj Ji and his family led to the movement being split between a Western branch, led by Maharaj Ji, and an Indian branch, run by his mother and Bal Bhagwan Ji.

The failure of Millennium '73 led the Western branch to shift away from Indian influences and trappings, according to some observers. Sikh scholar Kirpal Singh Khalsa wrote that the DLM "no longer projected itself as a movement that would include all of humanity in its membership." The Western DLM moved away from its ascetic, "world-rejecting" origins and adopted a "world-affirming position". Beginning in 1982, Guru Maharaj Ji changed the DLM into the more loosely organized Elan Vital. Michael York wrote that, as result of poor attendance and financial failure, Maharaj Ji changed the name of the movement and "distanced himself from his status as a divine guru". He became known as Maharaji or Prem Rawat and was presented as an inspirational speaker and teacher. Bal Bhagwan Ji became known as Satpal Maharaj or Satpal Rawat, and his branch is now known as Manav Utthan Seva Samiti. Both branches have celebrated Hans Jayanti again since 1973.
