= Lord of the Universe =

1974 film by Michael Shamberg

- 1991 VHS edition
- Directed by: Top Value Television; Michael Shamberg
- Produced by: David Loxton; Top Value Television; Michael Shamberg
- Edited by: John. J. Godfrey; Wendy Appel
- Production company: Top Value Television
- Distributed by: PBS
- Release dates: February 2, 1974 (PBS); November 1, 1991 (VHS)
- Running time: 58 minutes
- Country: United States
- Language: English
- Budget: US$30,000

Lord of the Universe is a 1974 American documentary film about Prem Rawat (at the time known as Guru Maharaj Ji) at an event in November 1973 at the Houston Astrodome called "Millennium '73". Lord of the Universe was first broadcast on PBS on February 2, 1974, and released in VHS format on November 1, 1991. The documentary chronicles Maharaj Ji, his followers and anti-Vietnam War activist Rennie Davis who was a spokesperson of the Divine Light Mission at the time. A counterpoint is presented by Davis' Chicago Seven co-defendant Abbie Hoffman, who appears as a commentator. It includes interviews with several individuals, including followers, ex-followers, a mahatma, a born-again Christian, and a follower of Hare Krishna.

The production team of Top Value Television produced the documentary, using Portapak video cameras. The TVTV team followed Maharaj Ji across the United States over a period of six weeks, and edited a large amount of tape down to the fifty-eight-minute piece. It was the first documentary made on 1/2 inch (13 mm) video tape broadcast nationally, and also the first independent video documentary shown on national public television.

== Content ==
The documentary chronicles Guru Maharaj Ji, the Divine Light Mission, his followers and anti-Vietnam War activist Rennie Davis at "Millennium '73", an event held at the Houston Astrodome in November 1973. Rennie Davis, a follower of Guru Maharaj Ji, was one of the spokespersons and speakers at the "Millennium '73" event. His speech is featured in the documentary.

Abbie Hoffman appears as a commentator in the documentary and addresses some points raised in Davis's speech, stating: "It's rather arrogant of Rennie to say that he has found God and has his Telex number in his wallet." The TVTV crew interviewed different "premies", or followers of Prem Rawat, throughout the film, and one teenage boy is shown stating: "Before I came to the Guru I was a freak, smoking dope and dropping out – and my parents were happier then than they are with this." In a later part of the film, a loudspeaker voice announces: "Those premies who came in private cars can leave now. Those who came in rented buses can stay and meditate until further notice." Adherents of other belief systems also appear in the documentary, including a born-again Christian who criticizes devotees for "following the devil", and a Hare Krishna follower.

A separate storyline is seen concurrently through the coverage of the "Millennium '73" event, involving a man named Michael who has come to Houston, Texas, to receive "Knowledge" from Maharaj Ji. Once Michael has received the "Knowledge", he defends the secrecy behind the rituals. Michael's experiences are contrasted in the documentary with interviews with "ex-premies" or former followers of Maharaj Ji, recounting their initiation and later disillusionment with Maharaj Ji's teachings. One of them says that after receiving "Knowledge" from Maharaj Ji, he was told that this free gift required lifetime devotion and donations of "worldly goods".

Maharaj Ji is shown in a scene in the Astrodome relating a satsang to the attendants. He is seen dressed in gold-colored clothing and a crown, and sits on a platform throne. The story he relates to the crowd involves a young boy who comes to Houston, while searching for a Superman comic book. While seated on the platform, Maharaj Ji is surrounded by flashing moon signs and women wearing decorative garlands, while the band Blue Aquarius plays his theme song. The stage is decorated with glitter and neon lights, and Maharaj Ji's brother performs rock music songs. Abbie Hoffman gives a final comment in the documentary, stating: "If this guy is God, this is the God the United States of America deserves."

== Production ==
The documentary was produced by Top Value Television (TVTV) in association with TV Lab, and was primarily directed by Michael Shamberg. TVTV had received initial funding for the documentary through a small grant from the Stern Foundation, and an additional promise from the Corporation for Public Broadcasting. David Loxton arranged a post-production budget of US$4,000, and the total production costs for the documentary amounted to $36,000 – about forty-five percent of the average costs for a PBS film production at the time. Several camera crews used 1/2 in (13 mm) black and white portapaks and followed Maharaj Ji and his group across the United States for six weeks. The TVTV production team debated whether to include the secret techniques of Maharaj Ji in the documentary and finally decided that it was vital to disclose these practices in the piece. They chose to have an ex-premie divulge these practices rather than use a narration, but they were fearful of potential repercussions, which never came. TVTV member Tom Weinberg found a man who demonstrated meditation techniques in the documentary, which he described as being the "Knowledge". Producer Megan Williams stated that TVTV crew members empathized with the experiences of Maharaj Ji's followers, because there was very little age difference between them and the TVTV production team. Nevertheless, many in the crew of TVTV felt superior to these "lost souls" describing the followers as "gurunoids".

At the end of filming, eighty-two hours of tape were edited to the final fifty-eight-minute documentary piece. TVTV's team utilized graphics, live music, and wide angle lens shots. Stop-action sequences where quotations flash on the screen were also used for effect. The production was the first Portapak video documentary made for national television, and the "first program originally made on 1/2 in (13 mm) video tape to be broadcast nationally". Lord of the Universe was also: "The first independent video documentary made for national broadcast on public television." The trailer was originally broadcast on WNET Channel Thirteen television. Lord of the Universe was shown to a national audience in the United States on February 2, 1974, broadcast on 240 stations of the Public Broadcasting Service. It aired a second time on July 12, 1974. Later TVTV productions broadcast on public television included Gerald Ford's America, and a 1975 program on Cajuns The Good Times Are Killing Me.

In 1989, the documentary was included in an exhibition at the Whitney Museum of American Art on video art called "Image World: Art and Media Culture". The documentary was re-released to VHS on November 1, 1991, by Subtle Communications. On the packaging it is claimed that Guru Maharaj Ji "promised to levitate the Astrodome". Sources including TVRO, the library of the University of California, Santa Cruz, and Art Journal repeat this statement in varying forms. The documentary was screened in August 2006 at The Centre for Contemporary Arts in Glasgow, Scotland, as part of the Camcorder Guerilla cinema programme.

== Reception ==
=== Reviews ===
Ron Powers of the Chicago Sun Times called the documentary "highly recommended viewing", and described it as: "... both as an example of skeptical, unimpressed (but never vicious) journalism, and as a peek into the future of television ... a clever, ironic and eventually devastating documentary". Electronic Arts Intermix described Lord of the Universe as "a forceful expose on the sixteen-year-old Guru Maharaj Ji and the national gathering of his followers at the Houston Astrodome". Michael Blowen of The Boston Globe wrote that the documentary "captures the absurdity of Millennium '73", and that "The desperation of flower people alienated from politics is both touching and hilarious as they offer hope for eternal life to other converts."

Dick Adler of the Los Angeles Times gave the documentary a positive review, writing: "'The Lord of the Universe' doesn't really take sides, which doesn't mean it's a bland hour trying to please everybody. Its considerable bite comes first from the material TVTV so carefully gathered and there from the artfully wise frame in which it chose to present it." Deirdre Boyle wrote in Art Journal that the piece was "the zenith of TVTV's guerrilla-TV style". According to Boyle's Subject to Change: Guerrilla Television Revisited, as in all TVTV tapes, everyone in the documentary comes across as foolish, describing the production's sarcasm as the "ultimate leveler" using equal irony "both with the mighty and the lowly".

Katy Butler wrote in the San Francisco Bay Guardian that the TVTV style had improved since their previous work: "This show has fewer interjections from TVTV personnel, fewer moments that drag, more technological razzle-dazzle (color footage, slow motion, stop motion, tight and rapid cutting)." However, she described Guru Maharaj Ji and his entourage as "an easy target" and wrote that "anybody can look like a fool when a smartass wide angle lens distorts their face, and teenage ex-dopers who think a fat boy is God don't stand a chance". Butler wished that TVTV would move on to more challenging subjects for their future work. Bob Williams of the New York Post called the documentary a "deplorable film" and "flat, pointless, television". He wrote: "The hour-long program was remiss in not providing some small examination of the available box-office take of the goofy kid guru, much less telling prospective contributors how it got involved in spending how much of its foundation grants and viewer subscription money in such a questionable venture without more inquisitive journalistic endeavor, or ignoring gurus."

A review in The Oakland Tribune described the film as "a fascinating hour documentary on the guru's three-day happening at the Houston Astrodome", and commented that the event was "deftly captured by the mobile video cameras of TVTV, a group of talented young tapemakers". John J. O'Connor of The New York Times described TVTV's work as "a terrific documentary" and complimented the team on the visual results of the piece: "After TVTV superbly dissected the guru, his 'holy family' and his followers, more objective viewers might have chosen to laugh, cry, or throw up." In a later piece by O'Connor in 1975, he wrote that TVTV "gained a respectable measure of national success with 'The Lord of the Universe'".

=== Accolades ===
The documentary received the 1974 "Alfred I. du Pont/Columbia University Award in Broadcast Journalism" (DuPont Award). The jurors from the 1974 DuPont-Columbia awards stated that the documentary was: "hectic, hilarious and not a little disquieting. With a heavier and less sure hand, the subject would have been squashed beneath the reporters’ irony or contempt. As it was, cult religion was handed to us, live and quivering, to make of it what we would." The group's work impressed WNET president John Jay Iselin, and he raised additional funds that helped TVTV to produce five more programs, including Gerald Ford's America.

== Credits ==
Production	Wendy Appel, Skip Blumberg, Bill Bradbury, John Brumage, Steve Christiansen, Paul Goldsmith, Stanton Kaye, John Keeler, Anda Korsts, Harry Mathias, Doug Michels, Tom Morey, Rita Ogden, Tom Richmond, Van Schley, Jodi Sibert, Elon Soltes, Akio Yamaguchi
Editors	Wendy Appel, Hudson Marquez, Rita Ogden, Allen Rucker, Michael Shamberg, Elon Soltes
Producer	David Loxton. A TVTV production in association with the TV Lab at WNET/Thirteen. also: (Hudson Marquez, Allen Rucker, Michael Shamberg, Tom Weinberg, and Megan Williams)
Supervising Engineer/Videotape Editor	John J. Godfrey

== See also ==
- List of American films of 1974
- Shot-on-video film
