= Divine Light Mission =

Hindu organization

The Divine Light Mission (Divya Sandesh Parishad; DLM) was an organization founded in 1960 by guru Hans Ji Maharaj for his following in northern India. During the 1970s, the DLM gained prominence in the West under the leadership of his fourth and youngest son (Prem Rawat). Some scholars noted the influence of the Bhagavad Gita and the Radha Soami tradition, a.k.a. Sant Mat movement, but the western movement was widely seen as a new religious movement, a cult, a charismatic religious sect or an alternative religion. DLM officials said the movement represented a church rather than a religion.

When Shri Hans Ji Maharaj died in 1966, he was succeeded as guru by Prem Rawat, then just eight years old, despite rival claims from other family members. Although Prem Rawat was accepted as his father's successor, because of his age his family retained effective control of the DLM. In 1971, Rawat defied his mother by travelling to the UK and the US, where local branches of DLM were established and rapidly expanded. By 1973, DLM had over a million followers in India and tens of thousands of followers in the West, along with dozens of ashrams and hundreds of centers.

As Rawat grew older, he began to take a more active role in the movement and, when he turned sixteen, following the financially disastrous Millennium '73 festival, he took administrative control of the US branch. His increasing independence and his marriage to a non-Indian in 1974, caused a permanent rift with his mother and two of his brothers, Satpal Ji Maharaj and Bhole Ji Maharaj. They returned to India, where his eldest brother Satpal Maharaj took over the control of the Indian DLM.

In the early 1980s, Rawat began disbanding the western DLM. He closed the ashrams and eliminated the remaining Indian influences from his presentation to make it independent of any specific culture or religion. In the US, UK, France and Australia, Elan Vital was formed to replace the DLM in supporting Rawat in his role as teacher.

== History ==
=== Founding and early years in India ===
Shri Hans Maharaj Ji, initiated by the Sant Mat guru Sri Swarupanand Ji, began teaching in the Sind and Lahore provinces of India in the 1930s. In 1950 he began initiating Mahatmas, followers who could themselves initiate devotees, and formed a magazine called "Hansadesh" which is still active in 2017.

In 1960 in the city of Patna, he founded the Divine Light Mission (Divya Sandesh Parishad) to organize followers across Northern India. At the time of his death on 19 July 1966, the Divine Light Mission had six million members in India.

During the customary 13 days of mourning, his mother and senior officials of the organization discussed the succession. Prem Rawat, who was 8 years-old at the time, addressed the crowd and was accepted by them as their teacher and "Perfect Master" and was named as Bal Bhagwan. Because of his age, effective control of the DLM was shared by the whole family.

=== International Footprints ===
In 1971, Rawat, then known as Guru Maharaji Ji, travelled to the West against his mother's wish & will. DLM was established in the U.S. and the UK. The U.S. branch was headquartered in Denver, Colorado. It was registered there as a non-profit corporation and in 1974 was recognized as a church by the United States Internal Revenue Service under section 501(c)(3).

By 1972 DLM was operating in North and South America, Europe and Australia. By 1973, DLM was operating in 37 countries, tens of thousands of people had been initiated (become premies) and several hundred centers and dozens of ashrams formed in the U.S. and the UK. DLM said it had 8,000 devotees and forty ashrams at that time.

In the United States, the staff at the headquarters grew to 125, and Telexes connected the headquarters with the ashrams. Social service facilities, including a medical clinic in New York City, were opened. A Women's Spiritual Right Organization dedicated to reaching out to persons in prisons, mental institutions and hospitals, was organized. The U.S. DLM published two periodicals: And It Is Divine (AIID), a monthly magazine with a circulation of 90,000; and Divine Times, a biweekly newspaper with a circulation of 60,000. The cover price of AIID was $1 but most were given away free, as were the advertisements. The World Peace Corps (WPC) was established as a security force to provide protection for Rawat. After Bob Mishler, the DLM President, was removed from power he said that Rawat got the idea to start a bodyguard unit after watching The Godfather. The WPC became the organizing agent of meetings and businesses. A variety of businesses were founded under US DLM auspices including laundromats, used clothing stores, a plane charter agency ("Divine Travel Services"), a repair service, and the "Cleanliness-is-Next-to-Godliness" janitorial service.

=== Detroit incident ===
On 8 August 1973, while Rawat was at the Detroit City Hall to receive a testimonial resolution praising his work, Pat Halley, who was at the time a reporter from Detroit's underground periodical Fifth Estate, slapped him in the face with a shaving cream pie. Rawat responded by saying that he did not want his attacker arrested or hurt, but the reporter was attacked by two men a few days later and seriously injured. When local members heard of the incident they notified Rawat in Los Angeles who extended his regrets and condolences to Pat Halley's family, and requested that the DLM conduct a full investigation. The assailants, one of them an Indian, were identified. They admitted their part in the incident and offered to turn themselves in. The Chicago police were immediately notified. The Detroit police declined to initiate extradition proceedings, variously claiming that they were unable to locate the assailants, or that the cost of extraditing them from Chicago to Detroit made it impractical. The arrest warrant remained outstanding. This lack of action by the Detroit police was attributed by some to Halley's radical politics. A spokesman later stated that the Indian national had been "shipped off to Europe".

=== Festivals ===
Festivals were a regular part of the Divine Light Mission's activities and a source of revenue. Members would pay from $50 to $100 to attend, and Darshan events would generate considerable donations. The DLM celebrated three main festivals: Holi, which is celebrated in late March or early April; Guru Puja, which was held in July; and Hans Jayanti, which falls in November. Hans Jayanti marks the birthday of the DLM's founder. According to Marc Galanter, the members at a festival in Orlando, Florida "looked as though they had been drawn from the graduate campus of a large university—bright, not too carefully groomed, casually dressed. They were lively, good-tempered, and committed to their mutual effort. There was no idleness, brashness, marijuana, beer, loud music, or flirtation—all hallmarks of a more typical assembly of people in their twenties". Other festivals were held nationally and locally, and sometimes organized with little advance notice. Attending as many as ten festivals a year meant many members were unable to hold regular full-time jobs, and required sacrificing leisure and community activities in order to devote time to earning the money needed to attend.

In 1972, seven jumbo jets were chartered to bring members from the U.S. and other countries to the Hans Jayanti festival held at the main ashram near New Delhi. 2500 foreign members camped out at the mission's "city of love" for a month. The event attracted a reported total of 500,000 attendees. When Rawat flew to India to attend he was accused of attempting to smuggle $65,000 worth of cash and jewelry into the country, but no charges were ever filed, and the Indian government later issued an apology. The accusation led to negative coverage in the Indian press and hard feelings between Rawat and his mother, who had persuaded him to return to India for the festival.

In June 1973, the British DLM, with Prem Rawat's mother acting on behalf of her son, organized the 'Festival of Love' at Alexandra Palace in London. While it drew thousands of attendees, Rawat began receiving hostile press coverage, partly due to his showing up late, or not at all, at scheduled appearances. The membership had grown very rapidly but the organizers had no clear idea where to lead the following, nor did they have the financial resources to maintain so many full-time workers.

==== Millennium '73 ====
The 1973 Hans Jayanti festival was held at the Astrodome in Houston, Texas, and publicized as "Millennium '73". The free three-day event was billed as "the most significant event in human history" that would herald "a thousand years of peace for people who want peace", the idea being that peace would come to the world as individuals experienced inner peace. To promote the event, Prem Rawat's 20-year-old brother, Bhole Ji Rawat toured with a 60-piece band, Blue Aquarius for two weeks giving free concerts. The 500-member tour was dubbed "Soul Rush" and traveled to seven cities on the way to Houston.

Rennie Davis, well known as one of the defendants in the Chicago Seven trial, attracted extensive media coverage as a spokesperson for Rawat. At the event, Davis declared that "All I can say is, honestly, very soon now, every single human being will know the one who was waited for by every religion of all times has actually come." In a press conference at Millennium, Rawat denied being the Messiah, and when asked by reporters about the contradictions between what he said about himself and what his followers said about him, Rawat replied, "Why don't you do me a favor ... why don't you go to the devotees and ask their explanation about it?" While Rawat's brother Satpal was nominally in charge of the festival, Davis was the "General Coordinator" and handled the details.

Expectations for the event were very high, with predictions that it would attract more than 100,000, or even as many as 400,000 people from Satpal. Davis privately said he thought 22,000 was a more realistic estimate and reserved 22,000 hotel beds. There was even talk about a space in the parking lot reserved for a flying saucer to land. When Satpal heard about the flying saucer he said, "If you see any, just give them some of our literature". The actual attendance was estimated at 35,000, and at 10,000 by police.

The event featured spectacular staging, a 56-piece rock band and a giant video screen that showed a barrage of shots from the tumultuous 1960s. Though it was not covered by the national television news, it did get extensive coverage in the print media. The premies were reported to be "cheerful, friendly and unruffled, and seemed nourished by their faith". To the 400 premie parents who attended, Rawat "was a rehabilitator of prodigal sons and daughters". Media people found a "confused jumble of inarticulately expressed ideas." It was depicted in the award-winning U.S. documentary "Lord of the Universe" broadcast by PBS Television in 1974. The event was called the "youth culture event of the year". Singer-songwriter Loudon Wainwright III visited the festival and later remarked that while the premies inside were looking happy the ones outside were arguing with Jesus Freaks and Hare Krishnas. Wainwright's song "I am the Way" was partly inspired by Prem Rawat.

At the festival, Larry Bernstein, a prize-winning, 41-year-old architect described a "Divine City" to be built from the ground up starting the following year. It was to feature translucent hexagonal plastic houses stacked on concrete columns and connected with monorails. Polluting vehicles would be replaced by electric vehicles, and solar power would be used to provide energy. Cards would replace cash. The use of advanced technologies to ensure pollution-free air, Rennie Davis told a journalist, would be a practical demonstration of what it means to have Heaven on Earth. Two sites were suggested: either the Blue Ridge Mountains or somewhere near Santa Barbara, California. The former president and vice president of the DLM later said that Prem Rawat had spoken frequently of building such a city. Plans for the city were delayed amid the fiscal crisis following the Millennium festival. Incorporation papers for the formation of the "City of Love and Light Unlimited, Inc." were filed in Colorado in 1974, and there was a failed attempt in 1975 to build the community near San Antonio, Texas.

The DLM incurred a debt estimated between $600,000 and over $1 million, attributed to poor management and low attendance. The debt severely damaged the DLM's finances. Event-related expenses were covered by short-term credit based on the expectation that contributions would pour in following the free festival. DLM's post-Millennium financial troubles forced it to close ashrams, sell its printing business and real estate, and to drop the lease on its IBM computer. Monthly donations fell from $100,000 to $70,000. According to Messer, "to pay the debts remaining from the Houston event, devotees all over the country turned over their own possessions to Divine Sales, which had crash garage sales, attended flea markets, and invented numerous activities to dispose of the goods." By 1976 it was able to reduce the debt to $80,000. Consequently, the festival necessitated policy shifts within the movement organization.

=== Marriage and rift ===
Because of Prem Rawat's age, Jagat janni Mata Ji, his mother, and her eldest son, Satpal Rawat (later known as Satpal Ji Maharaj) had managed the affairs of the worldwide DLM. As Prem Rawat approached sixteen he wanted to take a more active part in guiding the movement. According to Downton, "this meant he had to encroach on his mother's territory and, given the fact that she was accustomed to having control, a fight was inevitable". In December 1973, when he turned 16, Rawat took administrative control of the Mission's U.S. branch and began to assert his independence from his mother who returned to India with Satpal.

In May 1974, a judge gave Rawat his consent to marry without parental permission. His marriage to his secretary, Marolyn Johnson, a 24-year-old follower from San Diego, California, was celebrated at a non-denominational church in Golden, Colorado. Rawat's mother, Mata Ji, had not been invited. As a result of his marriage, Rawat became an emancipated minor. He called his wife "Durga Ji", after the Hindu goddess Durga.

Rawat's decision to marry a Westerner precipitated a struggle for control of DLM. His mother claimed that Rawat had broken his spiritual discipline by marrying, and had become a "playboy". She appointed Satpal as the new head of DLM India, but the Western premies remained loyal to Rawat. The marriage led to a permanent rift between Prem Rawat and his mother, and was also credited with causing a profound disruption in the movement. Many followers left the ashrams to get married, and the base of support inevitably shifted from the ashrams to the wider premie community. Others felt "almost betrayed", in part because he had championed celibacy, one of the requirements of ashram life, before getting married himself. The bad press from the festivals and the rift caused by Prem Rawat's marriage in 1974 marked the end of the movement's growth phase.

In 1975, Prem Rawat returned to India in an attempt to gain control of the Indian DLM. A court-ordered settlement resulted in his eldest brother Satpal retaining control of the Indian DLM, while Rawat maintained control of the DLM outside of India.

=== Westernization ===
Following the rift with his mother, Rawat announced that he was replacing the predominantly Indian image with a Western one and began to wear business suits instead of his all-white Indian attire. The Indian mahatmas were replaced with Westerners, and Indian terminology fell from use. Rawat encouraged premies to leave the ashrams. According to one estimate, the worldwide membership had declined from 6 million to 1.2 million by 1976, and in the U.S. the 50,000 claimed initiates had dwindled to 15,000 regular contributors. A spokesman for the Mission explained in 1976 that the higher numbers had been inflated due to poor record-keeping. One estimate had from 500 to 1200 members living in ashrams in the mid-1970s. By the end of the 1970s, the movement had lost an estimated 80% of its followers in the U.S. Bromley and Hammond attribute the decline of groups including the Divine Light Mission to internal factors, but also in part to the news media's "discrediting reports about their activities", accounts which created a "wide-spread public perception of 'mind control' and other 'cult' stereotypes."

The Divine Light Mission also attracted the attention of the anti-cult movement. Some members were violently kidnapped and deprogrammed. Some former members became outspoken critics of the organization and attacked the group with what Melton calls "standard anti-cult charges of brainwashing and mind control". In reference to ex-followers, DLM spokesman Joe Anctil said that "A lot of people were just on a trip in the beginning. They felt they had to be 'hyped', and some didn't stay long enough to get beyond that. But we've changed as our understanding has changed." Bob Mishler, the founding president of the DLM in the U.S., was removed by Rawat in 1977 and gave an interview in 1979, along with the former vice president, in which he said he was concerned that the DLM was becoming a "tax evasion for the guru", and said he feared a repeat of Jonestown. They also accused Rawat of engaging in inappropriate behavior. Mishler's charges found little support and did not affect the progress of the Mission.

In the 1980s, Prem Rawat removed the Indian trappings from his message, and adopted a more Western style. Melton said the mission was disbanded [when] Prem Rawat personally renounced the trappings of Indian culture and religion, to make his teachings independent of culture, beliefs and lifestyles. Prem Rawat was no longer to be venerated as a god or regarded as a Perfect Master. The ashrams were closed along with the Denver headquarters (1979). The Divine Light Mission organization was replaced by Elan Vital; the U.S. organization's name was changed to Elan Vital in 1983, by filing an entity name change. Prem Rawat asked to be referred to as "Maharaji" instead of "Guru Maharaj Ji."

According to Ron Geaves, a religious scholar who has been associated with the teachings of Prem Rawat for the last thirty years:

Maharaji has chosen a route of perpetual transformation in which organizational forms are created and utilized and then destroyed, thus providing flexibility to deal with rapidly changing social attitudes, to provide pragmatic solutions to internal problems, and above all to keep his students focused on the core message rather than the peripheral requirements of organizational forms.

Since then the Elan Vital has been "virtually invisible." Rawat stopped granting interviews and making public announcements of his visits. As of 2008, he has continued to write, lecture, and tour with the support of the Elan Vital and the Prem Rawat Foundation.

=== DLM in India ===
In 1975, Mata Ji took control of the DLM in India as a result of the rift and installed her eldest son, Satpal Rawat, as its head. A lawsuit in India resulted in his brother Satpal gaining control of the Divine Light Mission in India, and Rawat continuing to lead DLM in the rest of the world.

Satpal Rawat, now known as Shri Satpal Ji Maharaj, teaches "Manav Dharam" (the "Dharam [Religion] of Mankind"). He is also a politician and former Union Minister in India, and founded Manav Utthan Sewa Samiti, which he describes as "an all-India registered voluntary social welfare and charitable organization", that is also "making freely available the spiritual Knowledge which is the essence of all religions." Satpal Rawat's supporters now assert that he is the rightful successor to his father, Hans Ji Maharaj. Scholars that have written about the succession report that Satpal and the rest of the family accepted and supported Prem's declaration of succession for eight years.

The Divine United Organization (DUO) was an organization registered under the Societies Registration Act 21 of 1860 with the Registrar of Delhi in 1977, to disseminate the teachings of Prem Rawat in India. According to Geaves, DUO remained in India until it was replaced by Raj Vidya Bhavan [sic]. Raj Vidya Kender (Center for the King of Knowledge) states on its website that it was registered under the societies Registration Act in 1977, with registration No. 8845/77, "by individuals eager to help in the dissemination of Maharaji's message of hope and peace."

== Beliefs and practices ==
According to some scholars, Shri Hans was influenced by both the Sant tradition and the Bhagavad Gita. Reinhart Hummel wrote that from the former came the reduction of Hinduism to the inner realization of the divine and the veneration of the guru, and from the latter the emphasis on the practical life. Hummel also noted that the DLM never developed a systematic doctrine, either during Hans' time or Prem Rawat's time. Hummel further asserted that the influence of the North Indian Sant tradition was dominant in Hans' eclectic thinking, and that from the Sant tradition also came the rejection of outward rituals and ceremonies; the rejection of asceticism in favor of life as a householder; the rejection of veneration of idols, and the focus on the guru as the manifestation of the divine. Hummel also noted that the four meditation techniques are of central importance to Prem, as they were to Hans.

No rules or regulations were imposed, and no beliefs or ethical practices were taught. The fundamental practices of inner peace were embodied and experienced through satsang, service and meditation, the sum of which is an experience called "Knowledge." Members of the DLM meditated formally twice daily and attended discourses on the Knowledge (known as satsang) when possible. According to Galanter "satsang could be delivered to active members or to those with only a casual interest. It was something of a polemic interspersed with parables, and because members were bright and sophisticated, these discourses tended to be engaging, making use of both Hindu mythology and Western philosophy". In a study by Flo Conway and Jim Siegelman, former followers said that they had spent 32.9 hours per week in group-related processes and ritual and 19.9 hours in additional study or indoctrination (lectures, seminars, workshops etc). Vegetarianism was encouraged but not enforced except in ashrams and Divine Centers.

Five "commandments" were part of the Divine Light Mission's teachings:

1. Do not put off until tomorrow what you can do today.
2. Constantly meditate and remember the Holy Name.
3. Leave no room for doubt in the mind.
4. Never delay attending satsang.
5. Always have faith in God.

In the United States, the early years of the Divine Light Mission were marked by the rapid growth of loosely affiliated local ashrams, united mainly by a shared devotion to Guru Maharaj Ji. As the DLM became more and more structured and centralized, leadership and power came to be concentrated in the Denver headquarters. According to scholars, Prem Rawat's desire to consolidate his power and authority over the U.S. movement led to increasing formalization, with rules and regulations for ashram living, standards for recruited "candidates," and pressure towards certification of the movement's teachers. According to scholars Foss and van der Lans, the teachings of Hans Ji Maharaj were minimized after 1975, and followers were expected to accept Prem Rawat as their personal savior.

David V. Barrett noted that the DLM movement was often criticized for emphasizing the superiority of subjective emotional experience over intellect. The sociologists Ralph Larkin and Daniel A. Foss made similar observations in 1978. In response, the religious scholar Ron Geaves, himself a member of the movement, accused Foss and Larkin of bias.

A 1981 article based on the Dutch branch of the Divine Light Mission, stated that the DLM had little philosophical background and that all its central creeds and tenets were described in the song associated with the Hindu ritual called aarti. Arti was sung to Prem Rawat in the morning and evening in ashrams.

Rawat says he does not charge for teaching people the techniques of Knowledge. Related organizations that support the dissemination of Rawat's message are funded by donations. According to the Prem Rawat Foundation, it is supported by people who appreciate Rawat's message and wish to help make it available to others.

== Members ==
In a comparison of new religious movements, Gartrell and Shannon noted that people appeared to seek out such religious organizations to get answers to questions about ultimate meaning as well as answers to more prosaic issues. In discussing the differences in recruiting tactics employed by these groups, they placed the Divine Light Mission in the middle ground between movements in which recruits were love bombed, or overwhelmed by waves of intense sentiment, and those in which affective bonds were discouraged. They reported that close ties between newcomers and DLM members developed gradually over a period of three to four months, between initial contact and their attending a "Knowledge session", and the emergent friendships were an important forum in which recruits aired doubts and discussed DLM beliefs. These relationships thus supplemented a very cognitive conversion process, in which active consideration of the movement's ideas and beliefs was encouraged from the outset. They found little evidence to suggest that social rewards were orchestrated by the movement, either in degree or timing.

The sociologist James V. Downton, who studied the DLM for five years, reported that the "idealism of these premies was one of the motivating forces behind their conversion [to DLM]. They wanted to create a more caring world". Five years after the subjects of his study became premies he wrote:

"There is little doubt in my mind that these premies have changed in a positive way. Today, they seem less alienated, aimless, worried, afraid, and more peaceful, loving, confident, and appreciative of life. We could attribute these changes to surrender, devotion, and their involvement in the premie community. Each of these undoubtedly had a positive impact, but, if we accept what premies say, none were as critical as their experience of the universal spirit. Meditating on the life-energy for five years, they report having more positive attitudes about themselves."

According to Carroll Stoner and Jo Anne Parke, when they visited an ashram the premies "appeared to be in control of their own lives and seemed to be achieving some measure of peace as a by-product of a lifestyle they feel is constructive and healthy". When the same members attended an appearance by Prem Rawat a week later, "they lost control, sobbed and swayed and knelt to kiss his feet."

According to Foss and van der Lans, members who joined before 1975 tended to be young people from the counterculture who had used psychedelic drugs. Later members, they asserted, were older and more responsible with ordinary jobs who were disillusioned with conventional religions or other Eastern movements.

A study of group cohesiveness carried out by Marc Galanter in 1974, based on questionnaire responses given by 119 DLM members randomly chosen from festival registration lines, found that after two years involvement with DLM, members reported a considerable decline in psychological distress and drug use compared to their pre membership status. The study found that 45% of those surveyed had used marijuana daily before joining, while only 7% did so at the time of the study. Seventy-one percent reported psychological stress before joining compared to 37% at the time of the study. Overall, 38% had sought professional help for psychological problems before joining. These observations led to what Galanter's describes as "an apparent overall improvement in psychiatric state derived from conversion and its retention through continued membership", and that members, whether they were seriously distressed or not before joining, reported an improved emotional state after joining. Galanter reports that 82% of members surveyed were single, 97% were white, and 73% were in their twenties. The percentage of these with Catholic or Protestant backgrounds mirrored the general population, while there were ten times as many members with Jewish backgrounds as in the general population (21% versus 2%). Three-quarters of them had attended college.

James V. Downton conducted a comparative study of 41 DLM members from three US cities, 29 members of the Hare Krishna movement and 40 college students. Among the DLM members the average age was 23 and ranged from 19 to 29. They came from middle-class backgrounds, all were white and had attended an average of 1.5 years of college, similar to the Hare Krishna sample, though DLM members were less likely to have come from broken homes. Sixty-five percent of DLM members reported having religious experiences while tripping on LSD. Overall, 95% of DLM members had used psychedelic drugs, compared to 89% of Hare Krishna and 67% of the college student cohort. Compared to the college students, fewer DLM members had had religious upbringings and they tended to have had worse family experiences though only 17% came from "broken homes".

One member, writing in the 1970s said that followers were "nagged to donate funds of their own" and some devotees signed pledges to donate a dollar a day to provide the Mission with some reliable income. One former accountant for the DLM said that new followers were asked to turn over their entire savings, sometimes hundreds of thousands of dollars, and in several cases their families contested the donations. He was quoted as saying "it takes a lot of money to keep a guru." Bob Mishler, the mission's executive director, talked one person into signing over power of attorney shortly after she joined. Mishler was sacked by Rawat in 1976.

== Ashrams ==
=== In India ===
The Divine Light Mission began creating ashrams in India in the 1960s, starting with a small one in Rajasthan and a larger one called Satlok ("Place of Truth") between Delhi and Haridwar. Khushwant Singh, who visited the Mission's headquarters in Delhi in 1973 described it as being like a fortress with 8-foot (2.4 m)-high walls, an iron grilled gate enclosing a courtyard and a complex of buildings capable of housing 100 and with the capacity to feed 50,000 visitors on special occasions. Singh also described "the lavish use of marble, wall-to-wall carpets, chandeliers and modern furnishings" as evidence of affluence.

=== In the West ===
Only a small fraction of the overall DLM membership lived in organized ashrams during its short history but several dozen ashrams were formed in the U.S., Britain, Europe and Australia. Ashrams were run by "general secretaries" appointed by the national office. Each ashram had a "house mother" who oversaw cooking, washing, ironing, and food service but the normal isolation of the housewife and cook became a communal, everyone-pitchin-and-help festival. Followers ("premies") who lived in them often worked part or full time at ordinary jobs and gave a sizable portion – sometimes all – of their income to the movement. Ashrams typically had an associated business, such as a Divine Sales outlet and a Divine Service Company. The ashram premies became the core of the Mission in the United States, but the ashrams themselves were not a source of income, never becoming more than self-sufficient. Followers wishing to stay in the ashrams established by Rawat were required to fill out detailed applications that focused on their trust funds, insurance policies, and other assets.

In Australia in the early 1970s, a small percentage of premies lived in ashrams. Some premies choose to live in an ashram for a couple of months, to get into their meditation, and then moved out into households or shared houses. Ashram rules demanded celibacy and abstinence from meat, alcohol, cigarettes and drugs. Married people, as well as single, lived in ashrams and, in their case, the practice of celibacy meant that they had sexual relations only with their marital partner. About three hundred people chose to live in communal houses and almost all households were non-smoking, non-drinking and vegetarian and, in some, the finances and energies were pooled for the good of all. Each household made its own decisions about life styles and often contained students and married couples.

In addition to the ashrams, there were many more residences with less formality. "Premie Centers", were households committed to the Mission's activity that donated 30% of their income and followed dietary rules, but that allowed married, non-celibate couples and children, and which weren't subject to orders from the national Mission. "Premie houses" were informal households (with as many as 30 followers) held together by their shared commitments and values. Ashrams served as local coordinating centers for all the local devotees.

Carroll Stoner and Jo Anne Parke wrote in 1977 of their visits to several ashrams that "there was no persuasion or cajoling for us to become part of this group. We did feel a sense of calm and peace in the ashrams. Marc Galanter, wrote in 1989 of his visit to a DLM ashram that —

"The atmosphere in the ashram was indeed quite striking. ... I was greeted in a friendly, even intimate fashion by people who were complete strangers. The intense communality of the members was immediately apparent, a quality that was clearly an important aspect of the group's function. One could sense a closeness among those present, and an absence of the minor tensions that would be expected in a setting where two dozen people were living in tight quarters. ... Caring and intimacy, reflective of the group's cohesiveness, seemed to mute any expression of animosity. ... I was made to feel as if I were entering a supportive envelope, to be protected from the rough edges of relationships in the outside world.

== Reception ==
The Divine Light Mission was described in various and sometimes conflicting terms. It was called a new religious movement, a cult, a charismatic religious sect, an offshoot of Sant Mat, an alternative religion or spin-off from other traditional religions, a youth religion, a Radhasoami offshoot, an orthodox Sikh community, an Advait Mat related tradition, a proselytizing religion ("Guru-ism"), and a defunct religious movement. A study of terms used in U.S. newspapers and news magazines, which examined the media's failure to use the more neutral terminology favored by social scientists, found that the Divine Light Mission was referred to as a "sect" in 10.3% of articles, as a "cult" in 24.1%, and as both in 13.8%. It was referred to as a "sect" in 21.4% of headlines, with 0% for "cult".

The president and spokesman of the DLM said in 1977 that "they represent a church rather than a religion".

In some countries, the DLM faced persecution and even banning. In 1972, in Argentina, as part of a crackdown on small religious groups by the military junta, 87 members of the DLM were arrested in Mar del Plata on charges of using drugs and practising their faith. The DLM, the Hare Krishnas and the Jehovah's Witnesses were banned, reportedly at the behest of the Roman Catholic Church. The Government Junta of Chile (1973) arrested over 200 members, including 12 foreigners, in 1974. The Jehovah's Witnesses and DLM were also banned by Singapore authorities.

Bromley and Hammond described the Divine Light Mission as belonging in a "medium tension category", among movements that were seen by the public as peculiar rather than threatening, and to which society responded with watchfulness and ostracism. Psychiatrist Saul V. Levine wrote that the DLM, along with other groups such as the Unification Church, was widely held in low esteem – families felt their children were being financially exploited while the groups' leaders lived in "ostentation and offensive opulence."

Ron Geaves states that the Divine Light Mission "developed into a vigorous new religious movement with its own specific traits that included characteristics of a contemporary North Indian Sant panth (sectarian institution) and nirguna bhakti was combined with intense reverence for the living satguru and millennial expectations of the western counter-culture."

According to sociologist Pilarzyk the youth culture response – mainly from a decidedly leftist political perspective – was somewhat ambiguous, combining indifference with some instances of overt hostility. Pilarzyk mentioned that these criticisms usually focused on the perceived phoniness of the "blissed-out premies", the "hocuspocus" aspects of the meditation, and the "materialistic fixations" and physical condition of the guru. These accounts are described by Pilarzyk as being quite negative and full of distortions from the DLM's adherents point of view and drawing responses from them that varied from bewilderment and amusement to extreme defensiveness. Positive comments came from youth culture "folk heroes" such as anti-war activist Rev. Daniel Berrigan, radical lawyer William Kunstler, and singer-songwriter Cat Stevens.

Summarizing his 1985 review of studies of a number of new religious movements, such as The Jesus Movement, the Unification Church, the Children of God group in Europe and the Divine Light Mission, James T. Richardson stated that "life in the new religions is often therapeutic instead of harmful", and suggested that the young people attracted to these movements were affirming their idealism by their involvement. Richardson asserted that his review found there was little data to support the almost completely negative picture of these groups painted by a few mental health professionals and others.

== Notable members ==
- Jonathan Cainer
- Sophia Collier
- Rennie Davis
- Paul Dunmall
- Timothy Gallwey
- Ron Geaves
- Michael Nouri
- Jimmie Dale Gilmore
- John Grefe
- Tommy Hancock
- Jenny McLeod
- Johnny Rodgers

== See also ==
- Contemporary Sant Mat movements
- New religious movement
