= Techniques of Knowledge =

Knowledge is a term used by Shri Hans Ji Maharaj (Hans Rawat) to denote a formulation of four specific techniques that were imparted in a process of initiation. The term continues to be used by two of Shri Hans Ji Maharaj's sons, Satpal Rawat and Prem Rawat.

== Origins ==
These techniques have some similarities to techniques in Sant Mat derived movements and may be derived from Surat Shabd Yoga. Additionally, Kranenborg writes that the techniques of Knowledge originated from the Surat Shabda Yoga or Sant Mat, the Path of the Sound Current, and that some of the techniques are related to the 'japa-' or mantra-yoga which are similar to some techniques of Transcendental meditation and the Hare Krishnas.

The website "Maharaji.org" (1999) included the traceable story of "Masters" that, according to Prem Rawat, referred to the techniques of Knowledge since 1780, including Totapuri, Anandpuri Ji, Dayal Ji, Swarupanand Ji, and his father Hans Ji Maharaj.

== Descriptions ==
According to the Dutch religious scholar and Christian minister Reender Kranenborg and the American religious scholar J. Gordon Melton, these techniques are secret and were originally called "Light", "Sound", "Name" or "Word" and "Nectar" but Prem Rawat now refers to them as the 1st, 2nd, 3rd and 4th techniques. Prem Rawat asks practitioners to promise "not to reveal these techniques to anyone", but says to "let other people go through their own journey... [so] they, too, can have the techniques when they are ready."

Kranenborg and Melton provide differing details of them in their writings but agree on a general description of the practices, referring for some of those, to tantric practices or sabda-brahman meditation. Another description including the details of the four techniques of knowledge is provided by Dr. Daniel Kriegman who describes the process for receiving Knowledge utilized by the Divine Light Mission in the early 1970s. Michael Drury, describes these techniques as helping the practitioner to develop "a deep and spiritual self-knowledge."

== Experience ==
Jeffrey K. Hadden cites Prem Rawat in saying that "Knowledge is a way to be able to take all your senses that have been going outside all your life, turn them around and put them inside to feel and to actually experience you... What you are looking for is inside of you."

Glen Whitaker, former national organizer of Elan Vital in the UK, said "That which we seek is already within us. The process of reaching it is one of learning to experience what is already there. It is one the individual needs to perform for him — or herself, with the guidance and help of the teacher".

According to George D. Chryssides, this Knowledge was based on self-understanding, providing the practitioner with calmness, peace, and contentment, as the inner-self is identical with the divine, and that Prem Rawat emphasizes that Knowledge is universal, not Indian, in nature.

According to Stephen J. Hunt "the major focus of Prem Rawat is on stillness, peace, and contentment within the individual, and his 'Knowledge' consists of the techniques to obtain them. Knowledge, roughly translated, means the happiness of the true self-understanding. Each individual should seek to comprehend his or her true self. In turn, this brings a sense of well-being, joy, and harmony as one comes in contact with one's "own nature." The process of reaching the true self within can only be achieved by the individual, but with the guidance and help of a teacher. Hence, the movement seems to embrace aspects of world-rejection and world-affirmation. The tens of thousands of followers in the West do not see themselves as members of a religion, but the adherents of a system of teachings that extol the goal of enjoying life to the full."

The experience of Knowledge is described by practitioners as internal and highly individual. The techniques are to be practised privately, with no social structure or hierarchy related to their practice. According to students, there is no liturgy or social obligation involved, but Prem Rawat instructs them to practise the techniques daily for at least one hour to fully benefit from them. They also say that the techniques are universally applicable and their practice has no impact on or relationship to a student's gender, race, sexual orientation, economic status or national origin. Elan Vital, the organization that succeeded the Divine Light Mission, also states that practice of Knowledge will not affect a person's religion.

== Knowledge sessions ==
In his early days in the West, Prem Rawat or his instructors (called Mahatmas in India) conducted these sessions face-to-face with small groups.

Wim Haan, a student of theology who belonged to a critical movement within the Roman Catholic Church, wrote that receiving Knowledge involved a formal initiation that the aspirant had to keep secret and that he believed that the reason for the secrecy was a direct connection between the techniques, the initiation and the need to live a life of devotion to Rawat. Haan, who did not receive the techniques of Knowledge, also wrote that the fact that other groups may also use the same techniques would probably not help to increase the interest in them. Haan wrote this article based on observations of the Dutch branch of the defunct DLM between 1980 and 1981.
