= John C. Davis =

American labor economist & political advisor

John C. Davis was a labor economist and was U.S. President Harry S. Truman's chief of staff of the Council of Economic Advisers. His son is Rennie Davis.
