= Ron Geaves =

British scholar of religious studies (born 1948)

- Born: 7 June 1948 (age 78)
- Title: Former professor of the comparative study of religion at Liverpool Hope University

Academic background
- Education: University of Leeds (PhD)

Academic work
- Discipline: Religion
- Institutions: University of Chichester; University of Chester; Liverpool Hope University

Ron Geaves (born 7 June 1948) is a British scholar of religious studies who was professor of the comparative study of religion at Liverpool Hope University in England, retiring in December 2013. He was formerly Programme Leader and Chair in religious studies at the University of Chester in England (2001-2007) and Head of Department at the University of Chichester (1999-2001). He was chair of the Muslims in Britain Research Network (2007-2010) and instrumental in the creation of BRAIS (British Association of Islamic Studies), remaining on their advisory board.

== Academic career ==
His Ph.D. from the University of Leeds was on community formation amongst British Muslims (1990-1994) and he has remained interested in the history of the development of Islamic religious life in Britain throughout his career. He has become known by his expertise in the adaptation and transmigration of religions to the West, especially Islam, but also Sikhism and Hinduism and his academic championing of the study of 'lived' religions. He is the author of several books, including The Sufis of Britain, which explores the manifestations of Islamic mysticism in the UK and The Continuum Glossary of Religious Terminology an extensive glossary of seven major world faiths, The Study of Religion (co-authored with George Chryssides), a key undergraduate text. Probably his most successful work has been Islam in Victorian Britain: The Life and Times of Abdullah Quilliam, generating considerable interest among both Muslims in Britain and the media.

Geaves has taught several subjects including Islam, Hinduism, Sikhism, the Sociology and Anthropology of Religion, Judaism, Christianity and ancient religions. His interests lie in the spiritual manifestations of Islam and Indian traditions.

Geaves was one of the earliest Western students of Maharaji (Prem Rawat, known also as Guru Maharaj Ji). Geaves has written a number of papers related to Maharaji and his organizations, such as the Divine Light Mission, and Elan Vital. In July 2006, as he prepared to give an inaugural lecture at the University of Chester to dignitaries and members of the Muslim community in the North West of England, he commented that the 7 July 2005 London bombings were "primarily an extreme form of demonstration" that had to be seen within a long history of protests by British Muslims. He also said that "terrorism is a political word which always seems to be used to demonise people". Various spokespersons expressed strong disagreement with these statements.

Since retirement from full-time University employment, he has continued his research into British Muslim communities and working alongside various Islamic educators, engaged in curriculum reform. He is currently Honorary Visiting Professor in the Centre for the Study of Islam in Britain at Cardiff University.

== Works ==
=== Books ===
- Geaves, Ron (2000). The Sufis of Britain: An Exploration of Muslim Identity. Cardiff: Cardiff Academic Press. ISBN 1-899025-07-3.
- ——— (2002). Continuum Glossary Of Religious Terms (Continuum Collection). Continuum International Publishing Group. ISBN 0-8264-7921-9.
- ——— (2004). Islam and the West post 9/11. Aldershot, Hants, England: Ashgate. ISBN 0-7546-5005-7.
- ——— (2005). Aspects of Islam. Washington, D.C.: Georgetown University Press. ISBN 1-58901-073-6.
- ——— (2006). Key Words in Religious Studies. Key Words Guides. Washington, D.C.: Georgetown University Press. ISBN 1-58901-125-2.
- ——— (2006). Key Words in Christianity. Key Words Guides. Washington, D.C.: Georgetown University Press. ISBN 1-58901-126-0.
- ——— (2006). Key Words in Buddhism. Key Words Guides. Washington, D.C.: Georgetown University Press. ISBN 1-58901-129-5.
- ——— (2006). Key Words in Islam. Key Words Guides. Washington, D.C.: Georgetown University Press. ISBN 1-58901-124-4.
- ——— (2006). Key Words in Judaism. Key Words Guides. London: Continuum. ISBN 0-8264-8051-9.
- ——— (2009). Islam in Victorian Britain The Life and Times of Abdullah Quilliam. Leicester: Kube Publishing. ISBN 9781847740106.
- ——— (2018). Islam and Britain: Muslim Mission in an Age of Empire. London: Bloomsbury Academic Publishing. ISBN 978-1-4742-7173-8.

=== Articles ===
- The legitimisation of a North Indian form of Skanda worship in the UK: the transmigration of Baba Balaknath from rural Punjab to urban centres of Britain, with Catherine Barnes, 2nd Skanda-Murukan Conference, Published in DISKUS Vol. 4, No.2 (1996)
- Baba Balaknath: an exploration of religious identity delivered to the British Association for the Study of Religions' Annual Conference 16–19 September 1996 at University College of St. Martin, Lancaster.
- ——— (March 2004). "From Divine Light Mission to Elan Vital and Beyond: An Exploration of Change and Adaptation". Nova Religio. 7 (3): 45–62. doi:10.1525/nr.2004.7.3.45.
- ——— (2007). "From Totapuri to Maharaji: Reflections on a Lineage (Parampara)". In King, Anna (ed.). Indian Religions: Renaissance and Revival. London: Equinox.
- GEAVES, R.A. “INDIA 1857: A MUTINY OR A WAR OF INDEPENDENCE? THE MUSLIM PERSPECTIVE.” Islamic Studies, vol. 35, no. 1, 1996, pp. 25–44. JSTOR, www.jstor.org/stable/20836926. Accessed 11 Mar. 2021. https://www.jstor.org/stable/20836926

=== Contributions ===
- Partridge, Chris (2003). Mysticisms East and West: Studies in Mystical Experience (Studies in Religion and Culture). Carlisle: Paternoster. ISBN 1-84227-092-3.
- Elan Vital in: Partridge, Christopher H.; Melton, J. Gordon (2004). New religions: a guide: new religious movements, sects and alternative spiritualities. Oxford [Oxfordshire]: Oxford University Press. pp. 201–202. ISBN 0-19-522042-0.
- From Guru Maharaj Ji to Prem Rawat: Paradigm Shifts over the Period of 40 Years as a "Master", in: Gallagher, Eugene V.; Ashcraft, W. Michael, eds. (2006). Introduction to New and Alternative Religions in America. Vol. 4. Westport, CT: Greenwood Press. pp. 63–84. ISBN 0-275-98716-7..
