= Prem Rawat =

Spiritual leader (born 1957)

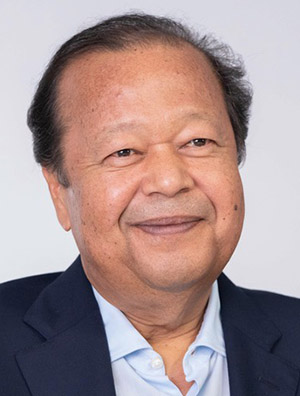
- Prem Rawat in Barcelona, Spain in 2018
- Born: Prem Pal Singh Rawat; 10 December 1957 (age 68); Haridwar, India
- Other name: (Guru) Maharaji
- Occupation: Speaker
- Years active: 1966–present
- Organization(s): The Prem Rawat Foundation; Words of Peace; Elan Vital; Divine Light Mission
- Known for: Peace Education Program; Millennium '73 "Peace Bomb" address
- Spouse: Marolyn Rawat
- Children: 4
- Parents: Hans Rawat (father); Rajeshwari Devi (mother)
- Relatives: Satpal Rawat (brother); Amrita Rawat (sister-in-law); Navi Rawat (niece)
- Awards: Lifetime Achievement Award of Asia Pacific Brands Foundation
- Website: premrawat.com

Prem Pal Singh Rawat (born 10 December 1957), formerly known as Maharaji, is an Indian international speaker and author. His teachings include a meditation practice he calls "Knowledge", and peace education based on the discovery of personal resources such as inner strength, choice, appreciation and hope.

Prem Rawat is the youngest son of Hans Ram Singh Rawat, an Indian guru and the founder of the Divya Sandesh Parishad, later known as Divine Light Mission (DLM). After his father's death, eight-year-old Prem Rawat assumed his role. At 13, he traveled to the West and took up residence in the United States. When young adults took interest in his message, the movement grew by tens of thousands. Many in the news media were perplexed by his youth and claims of divine status; he was also criticized for a lack of intellectual content in his public discourses, and for leading an opulent lifestyle.

Prem Rawat's marriage at the age of 16 to a non-Indian severed his relationship with his mother. At that point, the Indian branch of DLM controlled by his mother split from DLM everywhere else; at that point it was established in 55 countries. In the early 1980s, he began to discard references to religion in his speeches and closed the ashrams. The name of the DLM was changed to Elan Vital. Since that time, Prem Rawat has continued to travel extensively, speaking about peace to large and select audiences worldwide. On several occasions he has received recognition for his work and message of peace.

In 2001 he established The Prem Rawat Foundation (TPRF) to support his work and humanitarian efforts. Its Peace Education Program is licensed and utilized by correctional facilities and other service organizations around the world.

== History ==
=== 1957-1970 ===
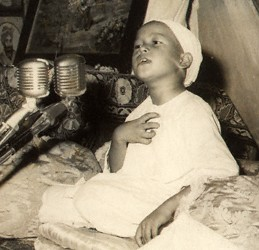
Prem Rawat in traditional mourning clothes, speaking after the death of his father in July 1966

Prem Pāl Singh Rawat was born in Haridwar, Uttarakhand in northern India, on 10 December 1957, the fourth and youngest son of guru Hans Rām Singh Rawat and his second wife, Jagat Janani Mata Shri Rajeshwari Devi. Prem Rawat attended St. Joseph's Academy elementary school in his hometown of Dehra Dun. At the age of four, he began speaking at his father's meetings, and at six his father taught him the "techniques of Knowledge." His father died in 1966, and during the customary 13 days of mourning, his mother and senior officials of the organization discussed the succession. Both his mother, Mata Ji, and eldest brother, Satpal Singh Rawat (known then as Bal Bhagwan Ji, and currently as Satpal Maharaj), were suggested as successors. Before either could be nominated, however, Prem Rawat addressed the crowd of mourners, reminding them that their master was immortal and still among them. In response, his mother, brother and senior disciples accepted Prem Rawat as their Satguru, bowed to his feet and received his blessing. Previously known to his father's followers as Sant Ji, Prem Rawat now assumed the title "Guru Maharaj Ji" and was called "Balyogeshwar" by others (roughly "born saint" or "born lord of Yogis") on account of his youth and spiritual precocity. From that time, Prem Rawat spent his weekends and school holidays traveling as his father had, addressing audiences on the subject of Knowledge and inner peace. Because of his youth, effective control of the DLM was shared by the whole family.

During the 1960s, Westerners in India searching for spiritual guidance met DLM members, and some became initiates or premies (from the Hindi prem, meaning "love".) British initiates invited him to visit the West, and in 1969 he sent a Mahatma, a close Indian student, to London on his behalf. In 1970, many of his new Western followers flew to India to see him. They were present at India Gate, Delhi, when, still only twelve years old, he delivered an address known as the "Peace Bomb," which marked the start of his international work.

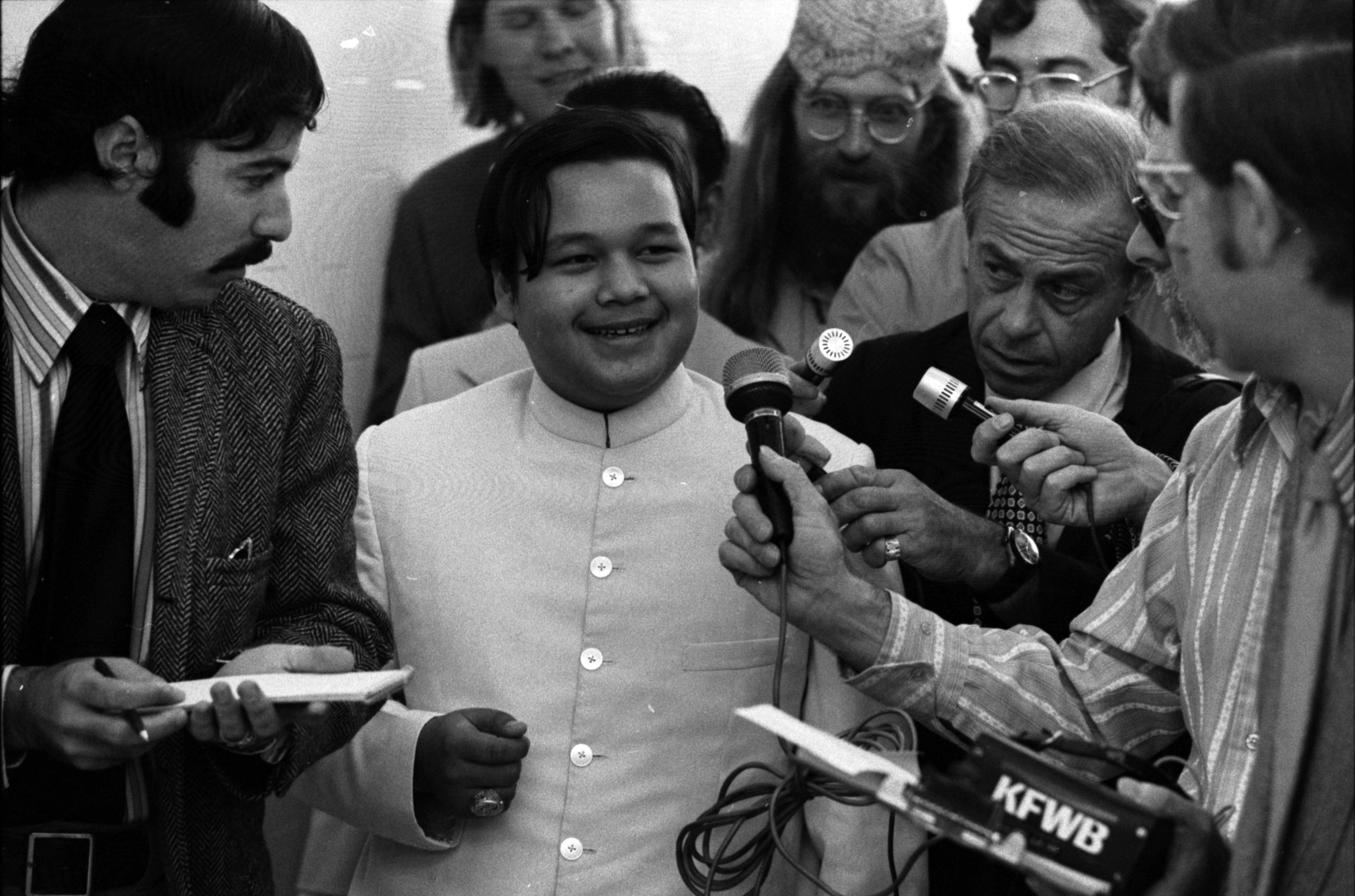
Arriving in the US, Prem Rawat at Los Angeles Airport

=== 1971–1975 ===
In 1971, Prem Rawat traveled to the West against his mother's wishes. His first western address was given in June 1971 at Glastonbury Fayre. Author Ron Geaves theorises that "the convergence of Prem Rawat, formerly known as Guru Maharaj Ji, and Glastonbury Fayre in 1971 was a key event in understanding the jigsaw that came to be known as 'New Age' spirituality."

He then went to Los Angeles, New York, Washington, Canada and South Africa. His arrival in the United States was met with some ridicule, as the teen-aged Rawat was seen as too immature to be a religious leader. However, he generated great interest among young adults, who were willing to examine his claimed ability to give a direct experience of God. Many were attracted by the sense of joy, peace and commitment shown by Prem Rawat's followers. One witness said that Prem Rawat "played the whole time he was there ... he played with squirt guns, flashed pictures of himself for all to see, and took movies of everybody ... Love flowed back and forth between him and his devotees." Enthusiastic new members spread the message that the 13-year-old Prem Rawat could reveal God. He returned to India later that year with 300 westerners, stayed in the mission's ashrams.

Prem Rawat started flying lessons when he was 13, and jet training at age 15. In 1972 two Cessna airplanes were obtained for his use. Traveling almost constantly, he was reported to have residences in the United Kingdom, the United States, India, and Australia.

The 1972 Hans Jayanti, an annual festival celebrating the birthday of Rawat's guru, was attended by over 500,000 people. Six Jumbo jets were chartered by American followers who paid extra so that South Americans could fly from New York to India for free. Other countries made similar arrangements to help the less financially able.

A reporter who attended an event in Boston in August 1973, which drew 9,000 attendees, wrote that Prem Rawat appeared humble and human, and seemed to intentionally undercut the claims of divinity made by followers. Sociologist James Downton said that from his beginnings, Prem Rawat appealed to his followers to give up concepts and beliefs that might impede them from fully experiencing the Knowledge (or life force). This, however, did not prevent them from adopting a fairly rigid set of ideas about his divinity, and projecting millennial preconceptions onto him and the movement.

Followers stressed "love, peace and happiness" in their lives, but public attitudes were often unsympathetic. Sociologist Stephen A. Kent wrote that as a 22-year-old hippie, he found Prem Rawat's message to be banal and poorly delivered, though his companions spoke about it glowingly.

In August 1973 while Prem Rawat was in Detroit to receive an award, he was slapped in the face with a shaving cream pie by Pat Halley, a radical journalist. Prem Rawat said that he did not want his attacker arrested or hurt, but Halley was attacked a few days later and injured. When local members heard of the incident, they notified Prem Rawat, who requested that DLM conduct a full investigation. Two followers were identified as the assailants and the police were immediately notified. The Detroit police declined to initiate extradition proceedings. There was speculation that the lack of action may have been connected with Halley's radical politics.

Prem Rawat's publicity campaign was unparalleled. One journalist reported,

Thousands of people follow him wherever he goes; posters of his round, cheerful face adorn the walls of buildings in every major Western city; newspaper reporters and TV cameras cover his every public appearance—particularly his mass rallies, which attract hundreds of thousands of followers each.

A tour of US cities was cut short in early September 1973 when Prem Rawat was hospitalized with an intestinal ulcer. His physician said that his body, weakened by the pace of continual travel, showed the stresses of a middle-aged executive.

The Hans Jayanti of 1973, named "Millennium '73", was held in the Houston Astrodome. Press releases said that the event would mark the beginning of "a thousand years of peace for people who want peace." The main organizers were Prem Rawat's eldest brother Satpal Rawat and activist Rennie Davis, who predicted an attendance of 100,000 or more; the event attracted about 20,000. Although not covered by the national television news, it received extensive coverage in print media and was depicted in the award-winning US documentary "Lord of the Universe". The premies were described as "cheerful, friendly and unruffled... nourished by their faith". To the 400 premie parents who attended, Prem Rawat was "a rehabilitator of prodigal sons and daughters". Some reporters, however, found "a confused jumble of inarticulately expressed ideas." The event was called the "youth culture event of the year".

The event's failure to meet expectations hurt the Divine Light Mission and left it heavily in debt, forcing changes within the movement. By 1976, the DLM was able to reduce the debt to $80,000. According to Thomas Pilarzyk, the Millennium economic deficit was partly the result of poor management by the "holy family" (Prem Rawat's mother and three older brothers), and partly the much lower than anticipated attendance.

Because of Prem Rawat's youth, his mother, Mata Ji, and eldest brother, Satpal Rawat, managed the affairs of the worldwide DLM. When Prem Rawat reached sixteen years of age he wanted to take a more active part in guiding the movement. According to the sociologist James V. Downton, this meant he "had to encroach on his mother's territory and, given the fact that she was accustomed to having control, a fight was inevitable". In December 1973, Prem Rawat took administrative control of the Mission's US branch; his mother and Satpal returned to India.

By the end of 1973, the DLM was active in 55 countries. Tens of thousands had been initiated, and several hundred centers and dozens of ashrams were formed. 1973 has been called the "peak of the Mission's success".

Rawat's upscale lifestyle was a source of controversy in the early 1970s. Some media reports said that he "lived more like a king than a Messiah". Critics alleged that his lifestyle was supported by the donations of followers and that the movement appeared to exist only to support his "opulent existence". Supporters said there is no conflict between worldly and spiritual riches, and that Rawat did not advise anyone to "abandon the material world", but said it is our attachment to it that is wrong. Press reports listed expensive automobiles such as Rolls-Royces, Mercedes-Benz limousines and sports cars, some of them gifts. Rawat said, "I have something far more precious to give them than money and material things—I give peace". "Maharaj Ji's luxuries are gifts from a Western culture whose fruits are watches and Cadillacs", a spokesman said. Some premies said that he did not want the gifts, but that people gave them out of their love for him. They saw Rawat's lifestyle as an example of a lila, or divine play, which held a mirror to the "money-crazed and contraption-collecting society" of the West.

In May 1974, a judge gave Prem Rawat consent to marry without parental permission. His marriage to Marolyn Johnson, a 24-year-old follower from San Diego, California, was celebrated at a non-denominational church in Golden, Colorado. Prem Rawat's mother, Mata Ji, had not been invited.

Prem Rawat's marriage to a non-Indian finally severed his relationship with his mother. She retained control of the Indian DLM and appointed Satpal as its leader. Mata Ji said she was removing Prem Rawat as Perfect Master because of his "unspiritual" lifestyle and lack of respect for her wishes. Rawat retained the support of the Western disciples. Most of the mahatmas either returned to India or were dismissed. Prem Rawat had become wealthy as a result of contributions from his Western devotees, and led the life of an American millionaire. He ran a household for his wife, his brother (Raja Ji) and his sister-in-law (Claudia), and financed travel for the close officials and mahatmas who accompanied him on his frequent trips around the globe to attend the Mission's festivals. By early 1974 the number of full-time DLM staff had increased from six to over one thousand.

In November 1974, seeking more privacy for himself, his wife and his entourage following security concerns, Prem Rawat moved to a 4-acre (16,000 m^{2}) property in Malibu, California. Purchased by the DLM for $400,000, the property served as the DLM's West Coast headquarters. Controversy around a helipad on the property was resolved by installing emergency water storage for the Los Angeles County Fire Department and limiting the number of permitted flights.

=== 1976–2000 ===
By 1976, most students viewed Prem Rawat primarily as a spiritual teacher, guide and inspiration. In January 1976 Prem Rawat encouraged them to leave the ashrams and discard Indian customs and terminology. He said that the organization had come between his devotees and himself. He decentralized some decision making to local premie communities, while he maintained his status as the ultimate authority over spiritual and secular matters. The staff at the Denver headquarters were reduced from 250 to 80. He described the managerial mentality that had grown in the Mission as "only cosmetic and totally unnecessary. It's like trying to take a cow and put lipstick on it. You can do it, but it's unnecessary in practical terms".

His appearance on 20 December 1976 in Atlantic City, New Jersey, wearing a traditional Krishna costume for the first time since 1975, signaled a resurgence of Indian influence and devotion. During 1977, many returned to ashram life, and there was a shift back from secular tendencies towards ritual and messianic beliefs. In 1977 Rawat became a US citizen.

In October 1978, the hillsides surrounding Rawat's Malibu estate were burned by a brushfire. His family and the DLM headquarters subsequently moved to Miami Beach, Florida. The family, which had grown to include four children, returned to Malibu in 1984.

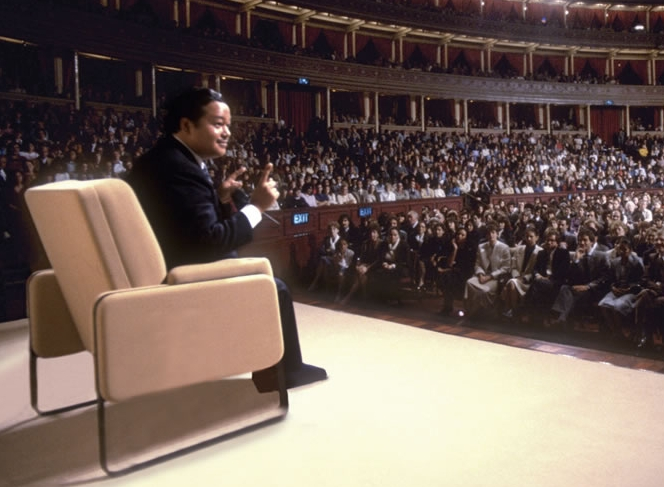
12 October 1981. Prem Rawat speaking at the Royal Albert Hall, London

During the '70s and '80s, the movement attracted substantial adverse publicity. In January 1979 the Los Angeles Times reported that Rawat was maintaining his Malibu following despite a rising mistrust of cults. Bob Mishler and Robert Hand, a former vice president of the movement, complained that money was increasingly diverted to Prem Rawat's personal use, and that the ideals of the group had become impossible to fulfill. The charges found little support and did not affect the progress of the Mission.

In 1980, Rawat removed all the "religious" aspects of the movement and declared he now wanted "no movement whatsoever". The Hindu references and religious parables that had been prominent in his teachings gave way to a focus on the meditation techniques. Once called "Perfect Master", Rawat abandoned his "almost divine status as guru" but affirmed his status as a master. Scholars such as Kranenborg and Chryssides describe the departure from divine connotations. In 1983 the Divine Light Mission was renamed Elan Vital and Rawat closed the last western ashrams, marking the end of his use of Indian methods for international objectives.

Throughout this period, Rawat toured extensively. In one two-year period he spoke at over 100 programs in 37 international cities, including New York, London, Paris, Kuala Lumpur, Rome, Delhi, Sydney, Tokyo, Caracas and Los Angeles.

In 1990 there were said to be 1.2 million followers worldwide, with 50,000 in the United States. The year 1999 saw the commencement of regular satellite broadcasts to North America and other countries.

=== 2001 – present ===
In 2001, Prem Rawat founded The Prem Rawat Foundation (TPRF), a Public Charitable Organization to support his message, and worldwide humanitarian efforts.

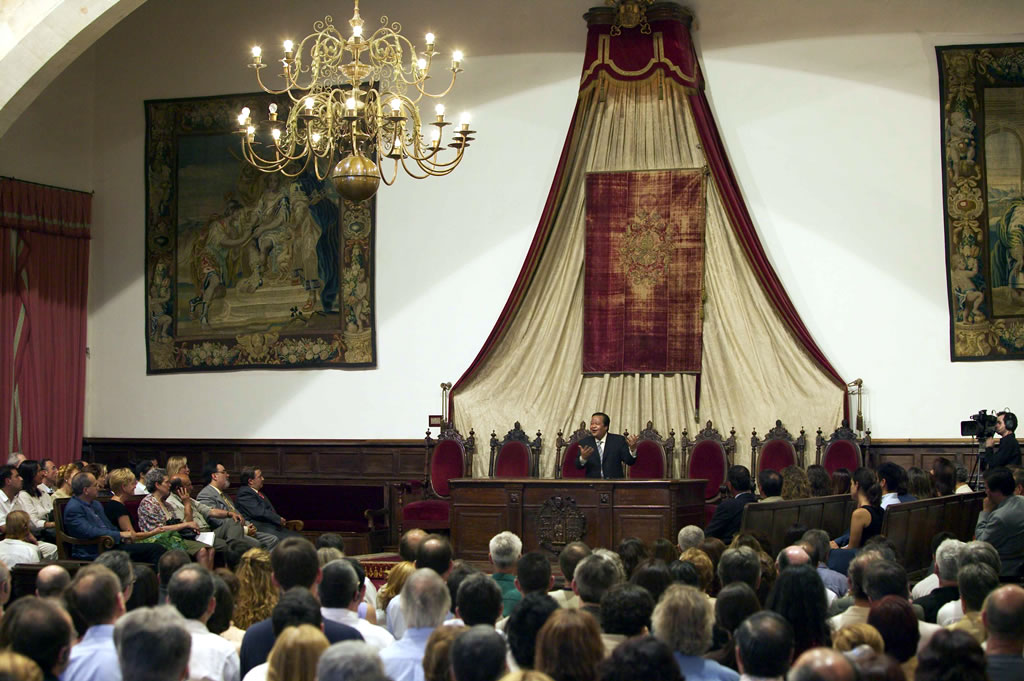
30 June 2003. Prem Rawat addressing the first "Conference on Peace" at the University of Salamanca, Spain

Writing in 2006, professor Ron Geaves, a long-time supporter of Rawat, noted how Elan Vital had explained that the only effective way of reaching out to the over 80 countries where Rawat's message was being promoted was by leased private jet, which Rawat self-piloted, flying around a quarter million miles a year.

A biography of Rawat, Peace is Possible, by Andrea Cagan, was published in 2006 with a foreword by Emilio Colombo, former President of the European Parliament and Prime Minister of Italy. In 2007, Rawat started the Peace Education Program for inmates which, as of 2012, operates in 25 prisons across 10 countries. Michael Gilbert, UTSA associate professor of criminal justice, stated that,"The constructive changes in behavior among participants have been noticed in our local Dominguez prison".

In 2006, Pierre Weil, Rector of UNIPAZ in Florianopolis, Brazil - a campus of an 'International Peace University' non-profit organization - awarded Prem Rawat the honorary title of Ambassador of Peace. In 2009, Prem Rawat was made Ambassador of Peace for the Basilicata region of Italy. In 2010, he spoke at the "Words of Peace for Europe" conference in Brussels, at the invitation of European Parliament Vice-President Gianni Pittella.

In 2011, he again spoke at the Brussels conference, "Peace and Prosperity. Founding Values of the European Union." At this conference, he was named ambassador of the Brussels Declaration “Pledge to Peace,” signed at the European Parliament. The Pledge to Peace was inspired by the principles of freedom, equality and solidarity enshrined in the preamble of the Charter of Fundamental Rights of the European Union. The Declaration of Intent encourages signatory governments, organizations, and companies to act independently in the design and development of peace projects.

In 2012, in Malaysia, Prem Rawat was awarded the Asia Pacific Brands Foundation Lifetime Achievement Award, "for his contributions in championing and promoting global peace."

In 2016, Prem Rawat delivered the keynote address at a forum hosted by TPRF and the Tutu Foundation UK at the British Film Institute in London. Government officials and NGO leaders met to explore peace education, reconciliation, alternatives to violence, prison reform and breaking the cycle of crime.

In March 2021, the Italian Ministry of Justice, Department of Penitentiary Administration, signed a Memorandum of Understanding to implement the Peace Education Program for inmates' rehabilitation. In April 2021, a similar agreement was signed with the South African government to implement this Program throughout the country's correctional centres.

On 17 June 2022, 51 years after he spoke at the Glastonbury Music Festival in June 1971, Prem Rawat received the first “Key of Avalon” award from the Council of Glastonbury, United Kingdom, in recognition of fifty years of working for peace across the world and his services to humanity.

Rawat is mentioned in the Guinness Book of World Records: "The largest audience at a book reading for a single author is 114,704 and was achieved by Prem Rawat (USA), in Lucknow, Uttar Pradesh, India, on 2 April 2023. The author read chapter 3 of his latest book “Hear Yourself” in Hindi to a ticket paying audience. The attempt was held at the Mata Ramabai Ambedkar Maidan in Lucknow." Another Guinness world-record: The largest attendance at a lecture is 375,603 and was achieved by Prem Rawat (USA), in Gaya, Bihar, India, on 26 November 2023.

== Teachings ==
The core of Prem Rawat's teaching is that the individual's need for fulfillment can be satisfied by turning within to contact a constant source of peace and joy. Rather than a body of dogma, he emphasizes a direct experience of transcendence that he says is accessible through the meditation techniques he teaches.

A number of scholars have said that Prem Rawat's teachings began in the North Indian Sant Mat or Radhasoami tradition, which dismisses ritual and claims that true religion is a matter of loving and surrendering to God who dwells in the heart. Geaves argues that this is not quite correct; referring to Rawat's own statements about his lineage, he places Rawat and his father within the tradition established by Totapuri, which also gave rise to the Advait Mat movement. Geaves argues that while the teachings within Totapuri's lineage have similarities with those of the Radhasoami tradition and developed in the same geographical area, they are nevertheless distinct. He adds that Rawat "is unusual in that he does not consider his lineage to be significant and does not perceive his authority as resting in a tradition."

Rawat has been criticized for a lack of intellectual content in his public discourses.

=== Techniques of Knowledge ===
Prem Rawat states that light, love, wisdom and clarity exist within each individual, and that the meditation techniques which he teaches, and which he learned from his teacher, are a way of accessing them. These techniques are known as the 'Knowledge'. In his public talks he quotes from Hindu, Muslim and Christian scriptures, but he relies on this inner experience for his inspiration and guidance.

Before they receive the "Knowledge", Rawat asks practitioners to promise to give it a fair chance and to stay in touch with him. He also asks that they not reveal the techniques to anyone else, but allow others to prepare to receive the experience for themselves.

Practitioners describe "Knowledge" as internal and highly individual, with no associated social structure, liturgy, ethical practices or articles of faith. According to sociologist Alan E. Aldridge, Prem Rawat says he offers practical ways to achieve spiritual tranquillity that can be used by anyone. Aldridge writes that Rawat originally aspired to bring about world peace, but now he places his attention on helping individuals rather than society.

George Chryssides describes what Prem Rawat terms 'Knowledge' as based on self-understanding and an inner self, identical with the divine.

== Organizations ==
Rawat inherited the first organization he was associated with (Divine Light Mission) from his father. Moving away from the trappings of Indian culture and religion, he later established Elan Vital and Words of Peace International, independent of culture, beliefs and lifestyles, and not bound to the traditions of India. The Prem Rawat Foundation (TPRF) founded in 2001, added more focus to humanitarian efforts.

=== Divine Light Mission ===
The Divine Light Mission (Divya Sandesh Parishad; DLM) was an organization founded in 1960 by guru Hans Rawat for his following in northern India. During the 1970s, the DLM gained prominence in the West under the leadership of his fourth and youngest son, Prem Rawat. Some scholars noted the influence of the Bhagavad Gita and the Sant Mat tradition, but the western movement was widely seen as a new religious movement, a cult, a charismatic religious sect or an alternative religion. DLM officials said the movement represented a church rather than a religion.

=== Elan Vital and Words of Peace International ===
DLM was disbanded when Prem Rawat renounced the trappings of Indian culture and religion, making his teachings independent of culture, beliefs and lifestyles. The DLM in the United States changed its name to Elan Vital in 1983, by filing an entity name change. Elan Vital became the name shared by several organizations supporting the work of Rawat. Independent Elan Vital organizations in several countries engaged in raising funds, organising speaking engagements by Rawat and in some cases broadcast his public addresses. Currently, Elan Vital is no longer connected to its originally Hindu or Sikh religious background. Elan Vital, Inc. in the U.S. is registered as a 501(c)(3) non-profit organization. It has been labelled a "church" in reference to its tax status. Its 2005 articles of incorporation described its purpose as performing "religious, charitable and educational activities". The Elan Vital website states that Elan Vital ceased operations in 2010, and has been succeeded by new entities such as Words of Peace International, Inc.

=== The Prem Rawat Foundation and others ===
In 2001, Prem Rawat founded The Prem Rawat Foundation (TPRF), a Public Charitable Organization for the production and distribution of materials promoting his message, and also for funding worldwide humanitarian efforts. TPRF has provided food, water and medical help to war-torn and impoverished areas.

The Peace Education Program (PEP), founded by TPRF, is a media-based educational program that helps participants explore the possibility of personal peace, and to discover personal resources – tools for living such as inner strength, choice, appreciation and hope. The program, not only successful in some educational institutions, had by 2012 also been adopted by 28 prisons in 10 countries including the United States, South Africa, India, Spain, Ireland, the U.K. and Australia. The voluntary program takes inmates onto a unique route of rehabilitation involving self-discovery, and hopes of a fulfilled life, within or without the prison walls.

== Reception ==
=== Media ===
From Prem Rawat's first travels in the West, he and his followers attracted media attention. In an interview in Der Spiegel in 1973, Prem Rawat said, "I have lost confidence in newspapers. I talk with them [about this] and the next day something completely different is printed." In 1973, the Divine Light Mission's 50-member public relations team concluded that Prem Rawat's credibility had been compromised by his youth, his physical appearance, and the Rolls-Royce, as well as the Detroit "pieing" incident and an allegation of smuggling (which was never prosecuted). The head of the team said that they needed to get the public to look past these factors to judge Prem Rawat's credibility.

Rawat commented on criticism during an interview on a Taiwan News channel in June 2014, "So far I'm concerned, my focus in life is not to appease critics, but is to bring the message of peace to people. ... When you've been doing what I have been doing for 5 decades plus, yes you're gonna get critics. ... People said, "He's going to fade away." Well, how about fifty-two years. And I'm still doing strong, because it is about my conviction. And my conviction is "peace is possible". And I will do everything that I must do, because it's important to me that people find that peace in their life."

Biographer Andrea Cagan described Rawat as a man who loves life and is focused "on spreading the message of peace."

In 2014, independent filmmaker Cynthia Fitzpatrick produced Inside Peace, a documentary about several inmates who had participated in TPRF's Peace Education Program while incarcerated at Dominguez State Prison, Texas. Premiering in 2015 in the United States and the United Kingdom to a positive critical response, Inside Peace received several awards. PBS aired the film across the United States in 2018.

In 2019, Penguin Random House published Prem Rawat’s book, Peace Is Possible - Thoughts on happiness, success and relationships for a deeper understanding of life. In 2020, Penguin Random House also released Prem Rawat’s book, Escúchate, the Spanish-language edition of Hear Yourself. The English version was released by Harper-Collins on 14 September 2021.

=== Sociologists' views: leadership type ===
Several scholars referred to Max Weber's classification of authority when describing Rawat as a charismatic leader.

J. Gordon Melton said Prem Rawat's personal charisma was one of the reasons for the rapid spread of his message among members of the 1960s counterculture.

Thomas Pilarzyk, a sociologist, wrote in a 1978 paper that the distribution of power and authority in the DLM was officially based on the charismatic appeal of Maharaj Ji, which he described as being somewhat ambiguous, and that many followers were not certain about his position in the organizational scheme of the movement, or the claim that he was the only true spiritual master.

By the early 1980s Meredith McGuire, a professor of sociology and anthropology, saw a process of formalization (transition of charismatic to rational management), resulting from Rawat's desire to consolidate his power and authority over the movement in the United States.

Around the same time, Paul Schnabel, a sociologist, described Rawat as a pure example of a charismatic leader. He characterized Rawat as materialistic, pampered and intellectually unremarkable compared to Osho, but no less charismatic.

Lucy DuPertuis, a sociologist and one-time follower who assisted James V. Downton with his book about the Divine Light Mission, described Rawat's role as a Master as emerging from three interrelated phenomena: traditional or theological definitions of Satguru; adherents' first-hand experiences of the Master; and communal accounts and discussions of the Master among devotees.

David G. Bromley described Prem Rawat and other founders of new religions as being held in awe by their early followers, who ascribe extraordinary powers to them that set them apart from other human beings. When describing the difficulty of charismatic leaders in proving to be above normal human failings such as not to suffer ill health or indulge in worldly pursuits, he used Rawat's marriage as an example.

Stephen J. Hunt described Prem Rawat's major focus as being on stillness, peace and contentment within the individual, with his 'Knowledge' consisting of the techniques to obtain these. According to Hunt, in Rawat's case the notion of spiritual growth is not derived – as is traditionally the case with other gurus – from his personal charisma, but from the nature of his teachings and the benefits to the individuals applying them.

Ron Geaves, a professor in various fields of religion and long-time adherent of Rawat, wrote that Rawat is not a renunciate, and that he has made great efforts to assert his humanity and take apart the hagiography that has developed around him. According to Geaves Rawat, rather than considering himself a charismatic leader, deemphasizes the sealing of the master disciple relationship, and focuses on correct practice and staying in touch through participation or listening.

=== Following ===
Estimates of the number of Prem Rawat's adherents have varied widely over time. Petersen stated that Rawat claimed 7 million disciples worldwide in 1973, with 60,000 in the US. Rudin & Rudin gave a worldwide following of 6 million in 1974, of which 50,000 were in the US. According to these authors, the adherents had fallen to 1.2 million for Prem Rawat's personal worldwide following in 1980, with 15,000 in the US. Spencer J. Palmer and Roger R. Keller published a general DLM membership of 1.2 million worldwide, with 50,000 in the US, in 1990 and 1997.

James V. Downton, who studied Prem Rawat's followers for five years in the 70s, said "these young people had a spiritual experience which deeply affected them and changed the course of their lives. It was an experience which moved many to tears of joy, for they had found the answer they had been seeking". Downton said by 1976 the vast majority of students viewed Rawat "as their spiritual teacher, guide and inspiration". Quoting a student he had studied, Downton said a typical view was that "the only thing he (Rawat) wants is to see people living happily and harmoniously together". Downton concluded that the students had changed in a positive way, "more peaceful, loving, confident and appreciative of life".

Paul Schnabel referenced professor in the psychology of religion Van der Lans saying that among his Western students, Rawat appeared to stimulate an uncritical attitude, which gave them an opportunity to project their fantasies of divinity onto his person. According to Schnabel, the divine nature of the guru is a standard element of Eastern religion, but removed from its cultural context, and confounded with the Western understanding of God as a father, what is lost is the difference between the guru's person and that which the guru symbolizes—resulting in what was described as limitless personality worship. Stephen Hunt wrote that Western followers do not see themselves as members of a religion, but rather as adherents of a system of teachings focused on the goal of enjoying life to the full.

Former followers became known as "ex-premies".

== Publications ==
- "Hear Yourself – How to find peace in a noisy world Audiobook. HarperAudio, September 2021, ISBN 978-0063070776
- "Cuando el desierto florece – El libro que hace brotar tu sonorisa interior" Penguin Random House 31. Juli 2018, ISBN 978-8403516205
- "Der Papagei, der alles wusste und nichts konnte – Weisheiten, die glücklich machen" Gütersloher Verlagshaus, 5. März 2018, ISBN 978-3579087030
- "Peace Is Possible: Thoughts on happiness, success and relationship for a deeper understanding of life" Penguin, 6. Juni 2019, ISBN 978-0-241-38544-9
- "Splitting The Arrow – Understanding the Business of Life" Hrsg. BUNYA LLC 2015, ISBN 978-4907298012
- "The Greatest Truth Of All" CreateSpace Independent Publishing Platform, 2012, ISBN 9781481028875

Mighty River Press published a biography of Prem Rawat on 15 November 2007, written by Andrea Cagan: "Peace Is Possible. The Life and Message of Prem Rawat" ISBN 9780978869496

== Works cited ==
- Jeremy, Kathleen (February 1974), "Jet Set God", Pageant, pp. 30–34, Volume 20, number 20
- Kahn, Ashley; George-Warren, Holly; Dahl, Shawn, eds. (1998). Rolling Stone : The Seventies. Boston: Little, Brown and Co. ISBN 978-0-316-75914-4.
- Levine, Richard (14 March 1974). "When The Lord of All The Universe Played Houston: Many are called but few show up". Rolling Stone. pp. 36–50.
- Moritz, Charles, ed. (1974). Current Biography Yearbook, 1974. New York: H.W. Wilson Company. ISBN 9780824205515.
