= Blue Aquarius =

- Origin: United States
- Genres: Big-band funk, psychedelic rock
- Years active: 1972–1974
- Label: Stax Records
- Past members: Over 50 including Kevin Dempsey and Geoff Bridgford
- Website: blueaquariusband.com

Blue Aquarius was a 1970s funk/rock band with a big band sound, consisting of over 50 members who were followers of Prem Rawat and led by Rawat's brother Bhole Ji. The band recorded a self-titled album for Stax Records' Gospel Truth label in 1972, and after performing at Millennium '73, they disbanded in 1974 at Rawat's order.

Blue Aquarius included guitarist Kevin Dempsey and former Bee Gees drummer Geoff Bridgford, who composed several songs on the album that were popular with Rawat's followers.
