= Elan Vital (organization) =

Group of spiritual organizations

- Formation: 1971 (In United States)
- Type: 501(c)(3)
- Headquarters: California, United States
- Official language: English
- Maharaji: Prem Rawat
- Key people: Russ Henderling, President
- Staff: Five full-time, plus volunteers
- Website: "www.elanvital.org". Archived from the original on 2010-02-21.

Elan Vital is the name shared by several organizations that support the work of Prem Rawat, a spiritual leader also known by the title "Maharaji". Independent Elan Vital organizations in several countries raise funds, organize speaking engagements by Prem Rawat and in some cases broadcast his public addresses.

The "Divine Light Mission" in the United States changed its name to Elan Vital in 1983, by filing an entity name change. According to the Encyclopedia of American Religions, the mission was disbanded [when] Prem Rawat personally renounced the trappings of Indian culture and religion, to make his teachings independent of culture, beliefs and lifestyles.

According to Glen Whittaker, a former spokesperson for the organization in the United Kingdom, Elan Vital no longer has any connection to its originally Hindu or Sikh religious background. The Historical Dictionary of New Religious Movements states that Elan Vital insists that it is not a religion and that Maharaji's teachings are independent of culture and by no means bound to the traditions of India. Elan Vital, Inc. in the U.S. is registered as a 501(c)(3) non-profit organization. It has been labelled a "church" in reference to its tax status. Its 2005 articles of incorporation described its purpose as performing "religious, charitable and educational activities". The Elan Vital website states that Elan Vital ceased operations in 2010, and has been succeeded by new entities such as Words of Peace International, Inc.

== History ==
The organization was originally incorporated in the U.S. in 1971 as the Divine Light Mission as a non-profit corporation and in 1974 was recognized as a religious organization by the United States Internal Revenue Service under section 501(c)(3). The organization changed its name to Elan Vital in 1983, by filing an entity name change. Elan Vital states in its website that the name was changed to remove Indian labels and to present Maharaji's message in a manner more congruent with Western culture.

The Elan Vital organization in the United Kingdom changed its name to HDSK (Human Development through Self Knowledge) at the end of 2009. In April 2010, the Elan Vital website announced that Elan Vital had stopped collecting donations and would cease operations in 2010, to be succeeded by entities such as Words of Peace International, Inc., a new US 501(c)(3) organization "closely aligned with Words of Peace Global (WOPG), the international charitable foundation that promotes Maharaji's message of peace".

== Purpose ==
The United States Elan Vital organization provided support for the dissemination and archiving of materials containing Prem Rawat's message. They say that their materials reach a global audience in 80 countries in more than 60 languages. They also state that Prem Rawat receives no compensation from Elan Vital, and that the organization is supported by voluntary contributions and sales of its materials.

The Elan Vital organizations in the United Kingdom and Australia are a registered charity and a non-profit, respectively, with aims and objectives similar to their U.S. counterpart. There are also Elan Vital organizations in Spain and Switzerland.

Persons who have been taught Maharaji's techniques can apply and receive a Smartcard, issued by Elan Vital in the U.S., that is used to facilitate admittance to events in which the techniques of Knowledge are reviewed, or to gain access to events designed specifically for people that have received such techniques.

== Reception ==
Ron Geaves, a professor of religion at Liverpool Hope University in England and follower of Prem Rawat, says

Elan Vital was established to more effectively promote Maharaji's teachings in a way that was free from any particular religious or cultural association.

Sociologist Stephen J. Hunt, writes

For Elan Vital, the emphasis is on individual, subjective experience, rather than on a body of dogma. The teachings provide a kind of practical mysticism. Maharaji speaks not of God, but of the god or divinity within, the power that gives existence. He has occasionally referred to the existence of the two gods—the one created by humankind and the one which creates humankind. Although such references apparently suggest an acceptance of a creative, loving power, he distances himself and his teachings from any concept of religion...deliberately keeping a low profile has meant that the movement has generally managed to escape the gaze of publicity that surrounds other NRMs.

Elan Vital was listed as a cult in a 1996 French parliamentary commission report. The report was compiled by the general information division of the French National Police (Renseignements généraux) with the help of cult-watching groups. This list has no official statutory or regulatory authority, and in May 2005 the former prime minister Jean-Pierre Raffarin issued a circular indicating that the parliamentary report should no longer be used to identify cults. A 1998 article in Rocky Mountain News referred to Elan Vital as a "cult". In 2002 an article by the Australian Associated Press referred to the organization as the "Elan Vital cult."
