= Rennie Davis =

American anti-war activist (1940–2021)

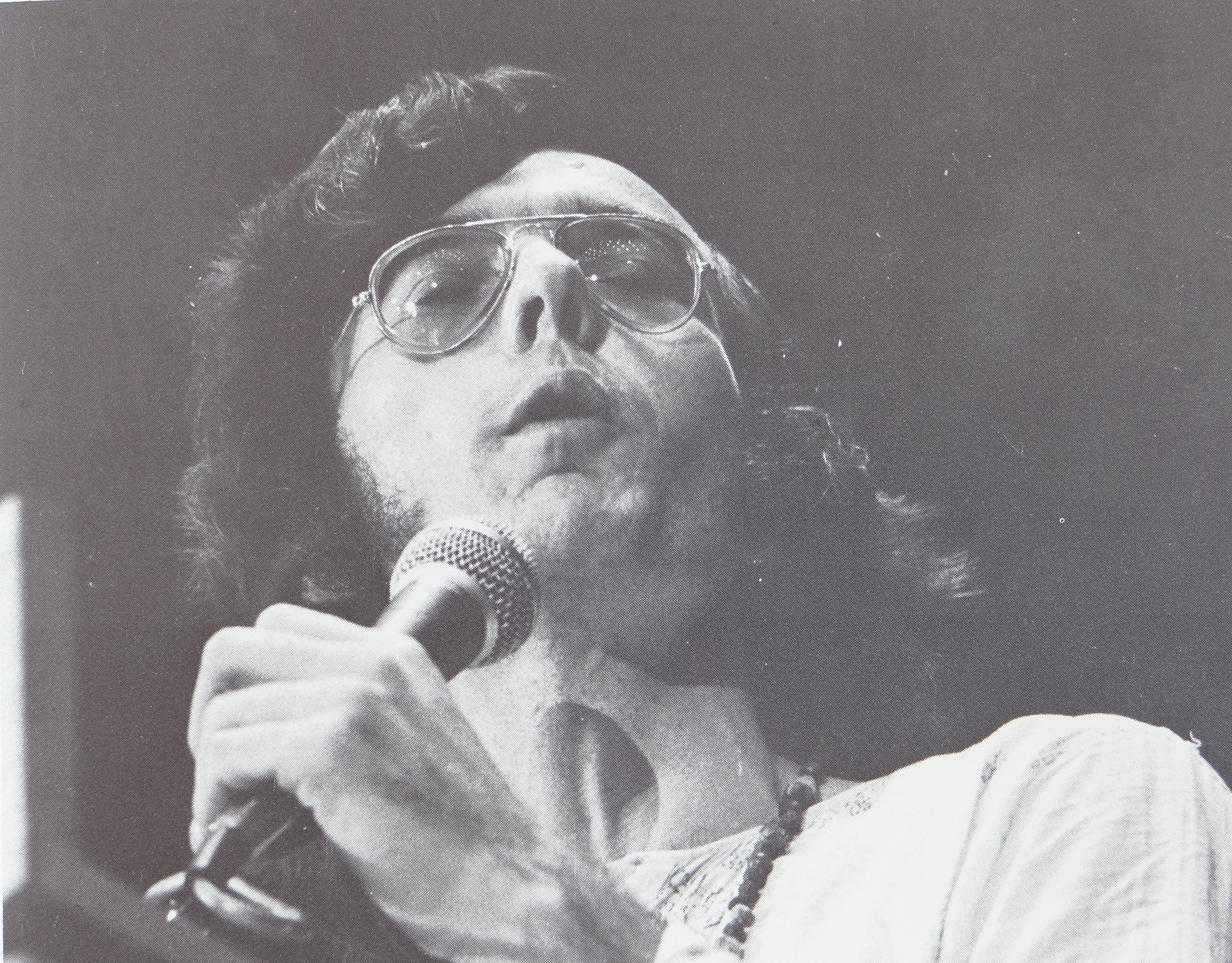
- Born: Rennard Cordon Davis; May 23, 1940; Lansing, Michigan, U.S.
- Died: February 2, 2021 (aged 80); Berthoud, Colorado, U.S.
- Education: Oberlin College (BA); University of Illinois, Urbana-Champaign (MA)
- Known for: Chicago Eight
- Spouse: Kirsten Liegmann
- Relatives: John C. Davis (father)

Rennard Cordon "Rennie" Davis (May 23, 1940 – February 2, 2021) was an American anti-war activist who gained prominence in the 1960s. Davis was one of the Chicago Eight defendants who were indicted following large-scale anti-war demonstrations outside the 1968 Democratic National Convention in Chicago. He played a prominent organizational role in the American anti–Vietnam War protest movement of the 1960s.

In the early 1970s, Davis became a follower of Guru Maharaj Ji (Prem Rawat) and his Divine Light Mission. He began to travel as a spiritual lecturer. He also became a venture capitalist, and founded the Foundation for a New Humanity to combine these goals.

== Early life ==
Davis was born in Lansing, Michigan, on May 23, 1940. His family moved to Berryville, Virginia, when he was in the seventh grade. His father, John, worked in nearby Washington, D.C., including as chief of staff to the Council of Economic Advisers under President Harry S. Truman. His mother, Dorothy, was employed as a schoolteacher. Davis studied at Oberlin College starting in 1958. After graduating, he went on to obtain a master's degree from the University of Illinois.

In the 1960s, Davis became active in the Students for a Democratic Society. He was the National Director of their project of community organizing programs (the Economic Research and Action Project, or ERAP) in Ann Arbor, Michigan. He became increasingly allied with anti-war groups, and helped organize protests and related events before and during the 1968 Democratic National Convention in Chicago for the National Mobilization Committee to End the War in Vietnam ("the Mobe").

== Democratic Convention protests and subsequent trial ==
Davis was one of the principal organizers of the National Mobilization Committee to End the War in Vietnam to plan anti-war protests at the 1968 Democratic National Convention. He negotiated unsuccessfully to gain a permit with Chicago city counsel David Stahl. At a police riot in Grant Park on August 27, 1968, Davis was among protesters beaten by Chicago police officers, and he suffered a concussion.

The Chicago Eight (later known as the Chicago Seven) were eight men charged with conspiracy, inciting to riot, and other charges related to the nonviolent and violent protests that took place in Chicago. The original eight protester/defendants, as indicted by the grand jury on March 20, 1969, included Davis, Abbie Hoffman, Jerry Rubin, David Dellinger, Tom Hayden, John Froines, Lee Weiner, and Bobby Seale, a Black Panther leader.

During the early part of the trial, Seale's case was separated from the others. The Chicago Seven defense attorneys were William Kunstler and Leonard Weinglass of the Center for Constitutional Rights. The judge was Julius Hoffman. The prosecutors were Richard Schultz and Tom Foran. The trial began on September 24, 1969. On October 9, the Illinois National Guard was called in to join the Chicago police for crowd control, as demonstrations grew outside the courtroom. Davis was found guilty of inciting to riot and sentenced to five years imprisonment. His conviction was overturned on appeal.

At his testimony, given January 23, 1970, Davis related, for the Court, a speech he gave at the University of Chicago on November 20, 1967, and, by extension, his reasons for demonstrating at the Democratic National Convention. The suppression of his testimony led the defense to motion for a mistrial. During his speech, Davis held up a small green steel ball, about the size of a tennis ball, and described how 640 of them were dropped by an American F-105 fighter jet over Nam Ding, Vietnam.

Now one of these balls, I explained, was roughly three times the power of an old fashioned hand grenade.... Every living thing exposed in that 1000-yard area from this single bomb, ninety percent of every living thing in that area will die ... whether it's a water buffalo or a water buffalo boy. This bomb would not destroy this lecture podium, it would not damage the walls, the ceiling, the floor ... if it is dropped on a city, it takes life but leaves the institutions. It is the ideal weapon, you see, for the mentality who reasons that life is less precious than property.... And in 1967 the American Government told the American public that in North Vietnam it was only bombing steel and concrete.... The American government claimed to be hitting only military targets. Yet what I saw was pagodas that had been gutted, schoolhouses that had been razed, population centers that had been leveled. Then I said that I am going to the Democratic National Convention because I want the world to know that there are thousands of Young people in this country who do not want to see a rigged convention rubber stamp another four years of Lyndon Johnson's war.

Foran objected that the methods and techniques used during the Vietnam war had nothing to do with whether or not people in the United States had a right to travel in interstate commerce to incite a riot. The Court sustained the objection and Kunstler motioned for a mistrial.

== Divine Light Mission ==
In the early 1970s, Davis became a follower of Guru Maharaj Ji (Prem Rawat). He was a spokesperson and speaker at the widely publicized Millennium '73 event organized by Divine Light Mission in the Houston Astrodome. He described the arrival of Guru Maharaj Ji as,

The greatest event in history. ... If we knew who he was, we would crawl across America on our hands and knees to rest our heads at his feet.

Texas Monthly quoted Davis as stating: "This city is going to be remembered through all the ages of human civilization." An op-ed in the San Francisco Sunday Examiner speculated at the time as to whether Davis had undergone a lobotomy, and suggested, "If not, maybe he should try one."

== Foundation for a New Humanity ==
Davis later became a venture capitalist and lecturer on meditation and self-awareness. He created the Foundation for a New Humanity, a technology development and venture capital company commercializing breakthrough technologies.

He appeared on Larry King Live, Barbara Walters, CNN, Phil Donahue, VH1, and other network television programs. He consulted and provided advice in business strategies for Fortune 500 companies.

Davis returned to Chicago for the 1996 Democratic National Convention to speak at the "Festival of Life" in Grant Park. He also appeared on a panel with activist Tom Hayden discussing "a progressive counterbalance to the religious right".

In a 2005 article published in the Iowa Source, Davis said:

If you were to do a survey of what causes misery on earth, it would tend to fall into three broad categories. One, we can call systems: the economy, AIDS, terrorism – things that are 'systems' in nature. The second would be a list of everybody to blame: Bush is the cause of my misery, my ex-wife, my boss. The third would be things that come utterly out of left field: a tornado through town, a tsunami, events that are not in our apparent control. What this huge list would have in common – something everybody would agree with – is that the cause of misery are things outside 'myself'. But the cause of our misery is absolutely, positively not at all what we believe it to be. This is not a new view. Certainly saints and philosophers in every generation have basically argued if you want to change the world, you have to change yourself.

== Death ==
Davis died on February 2, 2021, at his home in Berthoud, Colorado. He was 80 and suffered from lymphoma, which was discovered only two weeks prior to his death.

== Popular culture ==
- Robert Carradine played Rennie Davis in the 1987 film Conspiracy: The Trial of the Chicago 8.
- Davis voices himself in the 2007 animated documentary Chicago 10.
- In the 2010 film The Chicago 8 Davis was played by Bret Harrison.
- Alex Sharp portrayed Davis in the 2020 drama film The Trial of the Chicago 7.

== See also ==
- New Left
- List of peace activists
- Yippies
