= Stephen J. Hunt =

British professor of sociology

- Born: Stephen John Hunt; United Kingdom
- Education: University of Reading
- Known for: Alternative Religions: A Sociological Introduction
- Scientific career
- Fields: Sociology, religion
- Workplaces: University of the West of England

Stephen John Hunt is a British professor of sociology at the University of the West of England. Prior to his appointment at the University of West England in 2001, Hunt had taught at the Sociology Department at the University of Reading for thirteen years, as well as in the Religious Studies Department at the University of Surrey, Roehampton.

Hunt's primary research interests include the Charismatic movement, the "New" Black Pentecostal Churches and the "gay debate" in the Christian Churches.

He is the author of Alternative Religions: A Sociological Introduction, (2003). He is also the author of The Life Course: A Sociological Introduction, (2005) Religion in Western Society, (2002) and The Alpha Enterprise,(2004). He also edited the work: Christian Millenarianism: From the Early Church to Waco.

Hunt is on the editorial board of Pentecostudies.

== Education ==
- PhD, University of Reading, 1995

== Professional associations ==
- Member, editorial board, Pentecostudies

== Published works ==
=== Books ===
- Alternative Religions: A Sociological Introduction, Farnham: Ashgate Publishing, October 2003, 268 pp, ISBN 978-0-7546-3410-2, ISBN 0-7546-3410-8
- The Life Course: A Sociological Introduction, 10 February 2005, Palgrave Macmillan, ISBN 1-4039-1470-2, ISBN 978-1-4039-1470-5
- Religion in Western Society: Sociology for a Changing World, Palgrave Macmillan, 20 March 2002, ISBN 0-333-94592-1, ISBN 978-0-333-94592-6
- The Alpha Enterprise: Evangelism in a Post-Christian Era, Ashgate Publishing, October 2004, ISBN 0-7546-5036-7, ISBN 978-0-7546-5036-2
- Christian Millenarianism: From the Early Church to Waco, Indiana University Press, 1 July 2001, ISBN 0-253-21491-2, ISBN 978-0-253-21491-1, Editor

=== Articles ===
- 'Acting the Part: Living History – Who Joins and Why?', Leisure Studies, 23: pp. 387–403, 2004.
- 'Saints and Sinners: The Role of Conservative Christian Pressure Groups in the Christian Gay Debate in the UK', Religion-on-Line, November 2003.
- 'The Alpha Programme: Some Tentative Observations', Journal of Contemporary Religion, 2003, 18 (1): 77–93.
- 'The Lesbian and Gay Christian Movement in Britain: Mobilization and Opposition', Journal of Religion and Society, 4, 2002: 1–18.
- 'Deprivation and Western Pentecostalism Revisited: The Case of "Classical" Pentecostalism', Pentecostudies, July 2002.
- 'Deprivation and Western Pentecostalism Revisited: The Case of Neo-Pentecostalism', Pentecostudies, July 2002.
- 'The "New" Black Pentecostal Churches: The Growth and Theology of the Redeemed Christian Church of God', Journal of the European Pentecostal Association, 2002.
- The Redeemed Christian Church of God. Black Church Revival in the UK, Pneuma: The Journal of the Society for Pentecostal Studies, 2002.
- 'The Jesus Fellowship as a Total Institution', Communal Studies, 2002, (14) (4): 94–107
- '"Neither Here Nor There": The Construction of Identities and Boundary Maintenance of West African Pentecostals', Sociology, 2002, 36 (1): 147–69.
- 'The "Health and Wealth" Gospel in the UK: Variations on a Theme', Culture and Religion, 3 (1), 2001: 89–104.
- 'The British Black Pentecostal "Revival": Identity and Belief in the "New" Nigerian Churches', Ethnic and Racial Studies, 24 (1) 2001: 104–24.
- 'Dramatising the "Health and Wealth Gospel": Belief and Practice of a Neo-Pentecostal "Faith" Ministry', The Journal of Beliefs and Values, 2000: .
- 'All Things Bright and Beautiful: The Rise of the Anglican Charismatic Church', Journal of Evangelical Theology, 13 (1) 2000: 16–34.
- 'The Neill Commission on Party Funding in Britain: Recommendations and Implications', Talking Politics, The Journal of the Politics Association 14 (2), January 2000.
- '"Winning Ways"': Globalisation and the Impact of the Health and Wealth Ministries', Journal of Contemporary Religion, 2000.

== See also ==
- Charismatic Christianity
- Neuro-linguistic programming
- New religious movements
- Pentecostalism
- Prem Rawat
- Religion and sexuality
- Sociological classifications of religious movements
- Sociology of religion
