= Hans Maharaj =

Indian religious leader

Hans Rām Singh Rawat
- Born: 8 November 1900; Garh Ki Serhia, British India (in present-day Uttarakhand, India)
- Died: 19 July 1966 (aged 65); Delhi, India
- Spouse(s): Sinduri Devi (1st); Rajeshwari Devi (2nd, concurrent)
- Children: With Sinduri Devi: Savitri; With Rajeshwari Devi: Satpal, Mahi Pal, Dharam Pal, Prem Pal
- Parent(s): Ranjit Singh Rawat and Kalindi Devi
- Relatives: Amrita Rawat (daughter-in-law); Navi Rawat (granddaughter)

Hans Rām Singh Rawat, called Shrī Hans Jī Mahārāj and by various other honorifics (8 November 1900 – 19 July 1966), was an Indian religious leader.

== Early life and background ==
He was born in Garh Ki Serhia, north-east of Haridwar in present-day Uttarakhand, India. His parents were Ranjit Singh Rawat and Kalindi Devi. He was considered a Satguru by his students who called him affectionately "Shri Maharaj ji" or just "Guru Maharaj ji."

He had a daughter from his first wife Sinduri Devi, and four sons from his second wife Rajeshwari Devi, later known among followers as "Mata Ji" and "Shri Mata Ji".

== Life and work ==
At the age of eight, not long after starting at the village school, Hans Rām's mother died. From that time he was raised by his aunt. As a young adult he visited many holy men in the nearby mountains and pilgrimage towns in the area now the Pakistani provinces of Sindh, Baluchistan and Punjab. He was reportedly disenchanted with these and turned to the Arya Samaj, a popular movement formed to remove caste prejudices and idolatry from Hinduism.

The search for work led Hans to Lahore, the capital of the former Sikh kingdom. During this time he made his first contact with Swami Swarupanand, a guru in the lineage of Advait Mat, from Guna. In 1923, Swami Swarupanand taught Hans the techniques of Knowledge or kriyas, an experience of which Hans later said: "I was given no mantra, but experienced Knowledge. I experienced the music and light of my heart. My mind was focused within". Three years later, in 1926, Swami Swarupanand asked him to start teaching others the techniques of Knowledge, and for the subsequent 10 years Hans traveled through what is today Pakistan and northern India. A strong bond of teacher/disciple was formed between them which Swami Swarupanand reportedly referred to as follows: "I am in Hans' heart and Hans is in my heart".

In 1936, Swami Swarupanand took mahasamadhi in Nangli Sahib, a village near the north town of Meerut. Reported indications from Swami Swarupanand about Hans' succession were later contested by a group of mahatmas who noted that Hans had married Sinduri Devi from a neighboring village in the district of Garwal, making him a "householder", a status that in their view as renunciates was not acceptable. After the rift, Hans was left with only a handful of people to help him continue his work. Hans branched out on his own with the understanding that he had his teacher's blessings, and continued teaching throughout the Indian sub-continent.

That same year, he started presenting his message and teaching in the small town of Najibabad, near Haridwar. His talks at the time were strongly influenced by the egalitarian and reformist philosophy of the Arya Samaj, and he reportedly accepted anyone as his student, irrespective of caste, religion or status. This was an unusual stance for an Indian teacher, and it drew its share of criticism from traditional Hindus. During this year he published a book Hans Yog Prakash as a first step to broadening the dissemination of his message.

During the next years, Hans traveled by foot and by train to towns and villages across north India, speaking at small, impromptu gatherings at train stations, or under a tree in the village grounds. By the late 1930s, Hans had begun visiting Delhi, teaching workers at the Delhi Cloth Mills. He traveled constantly between Haridwar and Delhi, often staying at followers' houses at Paharganj and Connaught Place, behind the new Delhi center.

In 1944, as the number of students grew, Hans purchased a small, two-floor house on the bank of the Ganges canal outside Haridwar, and named it "Prem Nagar" ("Town of Love"). The mahatmas who were helping him in a full-time capacity lived there with him in the tradition of the gurukul. Four years later, he reportedly purchased his first car, a green Austin Somerset, that assisted him in visiting nearby towns and villages in his effort to reach more people.

Hans and his first wife, Sinduri Devi, had a daughter, Savitri, but after that Sinduri Devi was unable to have more children. As a consequence of that, and based on an understanding that Swarupanand reportedly had told him that "one day he [Hans] will have a son who would play an important role", he took a second wife in Rajeshwari Devi in 1946. Unlike his first wife, Rajeshwari Devi would in time become known as Mata Ji and play a prominent role in her husband's work. In 1951, their first son was born (Satpāl), followed by three more in 1953 (Mahi Pāl), 1955 (Dharam Pāl), and 1957 (Prem Pāl), affectionately nicknamed "Sant Jī" by Hans.

As Hans Rām's message was spreading throughout northern India, several initiatives were taken to facilitate his work, including the publishing of a monthly magazine named Hansadesh in 1951, and the formation of the Divine Light Mission (DLM). For nearly 30 years Hans disseminated his message without any formal organisation. After resisting suggestions for such an organisation, he finally gave in to growing pressure, and the Divine Light Mission was registered in Patna in 1960, to develop and structure the growing activities across India. The mission aims discussed are that "in principle all religions are one" and that the understanding that "peace is indivisible" and achievable by individuals and that "disgruntled individuals and dissatisfied nations can never promote lasting peace in the world." It also discusses some humanitarian initiatives.

By the early 1960s there were students in most large cities, towns and villages in the states of Uttar Pradesh, Bihar, Haryana, Punjab, and Rajasthan, as well as within the Indian communities in South Africa. Meetings were still small, and Hans' close relationship with his students continued. In 1963, the first of many large public programs was held in the Ram Lila grounds in New Delhi, reportedly attended by 15,000. In 1964, an event took place on Gandhi Maidan in the heart of old Delhi that attracted even larger crowds. Several ashrams were opened during that time, including a small one in Rajasthan and another larger one called Satlok ("Place of Truth") located between Delhi and Haridwar.

In 1965, Hans attended a religious conference in New Delhi's Constitution Club that was chaired by the then Speaker of the India Parliament, Mr. Ayengar. That year Hans flew for the first time when he visited his students in Jammu, Kashmir.

On 18 July 1966, while visiting a small ashram in Alwar, Hans fell ill, and the same day returned to Delhi by car. It is reported that he died at 3 a.m. the following morning. Three days later, in a procession led by his family and many grieving mahatmas, his ashes were taken to his home in Haridwar.

== Succession ==
During the customary 13 days of mourning following Hans's death, the succession was discussed by DLM officials. The youngest son, 8-year-old Prem Rawat, addressed the crowd and was accepted by them, as well as by his mother and brothers, as the "Perfect Master". Though Prem Rawat was officially the leader of the DLM, because of his young age authority was shared by the whole family.

For the next eight years Hans's family supported Prem Rawat as his successor but the latter's decision to marry a Westerner in 1974 precipitated a struggle for control of DLM. Mata Ji returned to India and appointed her oldest son Satpal as the new head of DLM India claiming that Prem Rawat had broken his spiritual discipline by marrying and becoming a "playboy". The Western "premies" remained loyal to Prem Rawat but the marriage led to a permanent rift within the family and was also credited with causing a profound disruption in the movement.

Satpal became the new head of the organisation in India and later also became a prominent INC politician, being elected to the 11th and 15th Lok Sabha; he is considered a satguru by his followers.
