= James V. Downton =

American sociologist (born 1938)

James Victor Downton Jr. (born December 11, 1938, in Glendale, California, also known as Jim Downton) is a sociologist known for his research on charismatic leadership, activism, and new religious movements. He received his PhD from the University of California, Berkeley in 1968 with his thesis, Rebel leadership: revisiting the concept of charisma, a subject he developed more fully in his 1973 book, Rebel Leadership: Commitment and Charisma in the Revolutionary Process. He was the first to coin the term "transformational leadership", a concept further developed by James MacGregor Burns, and one of the key concepts in leadership research over the past 25 years.

In 1982 Downton was a panel member of the Institute of Behavioral Science (Theda Skocpol States and Social Revolutions). In 1997 Downton was a reviewer for the American Sociological Review.

He taught for many years at the College of Arts and Sciences of the University of Colorado at Boulder, where he is now professor emeritus of sociology. In 1996, Downton received the Boulder Faculty Assembly Teaching Excellence Award. He was also one of the founders and director of the university's International and National Voluntary Service Training program (INVST). Following his retirement in 2004, the university established the Jim Downton Scholarship, awarded to two students each year in the Community Leadership Program.

== Selected bibliography ==
Books

- Sacred journeys: The conversion of young Americans to Divine Light Mission (1979) Columbia University Press. ISBN 0-231-04198-5
- Perspectives on Political Philosophy with David K Hart (Eds.), Holt, Rinehart and Winston, Inc.; Volume II edition (1971), ISBN 0-03-081405-7
  - Perspectives on Political Philosophy Volume I: Thucydides through Machiavelli
  - Perspectives on Political Philosophy Volume II: Machiavelli to Marx
  - Perspectives on Political Philoshopy. Vol. III: Marx Through Marcuse ,
- Downton, James V. (1973). Rebel Leadership: Commitment and Charisma in the Revolutionary Process. New York, New York: Free Press. ISBN 9780029075609. OCLC 604976.
- The Persistent Activist: How Peace Commitment Develops and Survives, with Paul Ernest Wehr, Westview, (January 1997), ISBN 0-8133-8139-8
- The Woo Way: A New Way of Living and Being (2003), Green Dragon Books, ISBN 0-89334-349-8
- Playful Mind: Bringing Creativity to Life (2003), Green Dragon Books, ISBN 0-89334-358-7
- Awakening Minds: The Power of Creativity in Teaching (2003), Green Dragon Books, ISBN 0-89334-361-7
- Blooming: Teaching of a Woo Master(2005), Green Dragon Books, ISBN 0-89334-403-6
- Why Am I So DAMN Unhappy?: And What to Do About It (2008) Robert Reed Publisher, ISBN 1-934759-02-3
- Today, I will . . .Words to Inspire Life Changes, (2009) Blue Mountain Arts, ISBN 978-1-59842-424-9
- Screwing Up Love or How to Make Love Grow and Last (2013) Create Space, ISBN 9781482367966

Articles

- Individuation and Shamanism, The Journal of Analytical Psychology, 1989
- Peace Movements: The Role of Commitment and Community in Sustaining Member Participation, Journal of Peace Research, Vol. 35, No. 5, 531-550 (1998) DOI 10.1177/0022343398035005001
- An Evolutionary Theory of Spiritual Conversion and Commitment: The Case of Divine Light Mission, Journal for the Scientific Study of Religion, Vol. 19, No. 4 (Dec., 1980), pp. 381–396, Blackwell Publishing
- Determinants of Commitment, Humanitas, Vol 8 (Feb. 1972) pp. 57–78

== See also ==
- Charisma
- Leadership
