= Bibliography of Prem Rawat and related organizations =

Bibliography of Prem Rawat and related organizations lists bibliographical material regarding Prem Rawat and organizations like Divine Light Mission, Elan Vital and the Prem Rawat Foundation.

Legenda

- Except in verbatim quotations (of titles etc.) Prem Rawat is always listed under that name in the columns below, whatever the dominant alternative name (Guru Maharaj Ji, Maharaji,...) at the time of the publication.
- Click icon to sort table according to entries in the column under it.

Author(s)	Date	Type	Title	Published in/by	Place	Other specifics
Rawat, Prem	November 8, 1970	Public address	Peace Bomb satsang	And It Is Divine (transcript: 1972); The Golden Age (transcript: 1978)	India, Delhi (in Hindi); U.S. (1972); Australia (1978)	
	November 9, 1970	Article (newspaper)		Hindustan Times	India	
	November 10, 1970	Article (newspaper)		Navbharat Times	India (in Hindi)	
	1970	Book (part)	Guinness Book of World Records	Sterling Publishing	U.S.	
	June 17, 1971	Article (newspaper)	Hallelujah! The mini Guru, aged 13, cometh	Evening Standard	UK, London	
	June 18, 1971	Article (newspaper)	Worshippers greet the boy guru 'straight from Heaven'	Daily Mirror	UK, London	p. 12
Rawat, Prem	June 1971	Public address	Glastonbury Festival address	Glastonbury Fayre (footage: 1972)	UK, Glastonbury; UK (footage)	
	August 2, 1971	Article (magazine)	Boy Guru	Newsweek	U.S.	p. 72
Allen, Henry	September 14, 1971	Article (newspaper)	Pretty Far-Out Little Dude	The Washington Post	U.S., Washington, D.C.	p. B1
Rawat, Prem	September 17, 1971	Public address	Colorado Satsang	Who Is Guru Maharaj Ji? (transcript: 1973)	U.S., Colorado	
	1970s	Magazine	Divine Times	Divine Light Mission	U.S.	
	1970s	Periodical	The Divine Times	Divine Light Mission	UK	
Rawat, Prem	1972	Book	Reflections on an Indian Sunrise	Divine Light Mission		
Ashokanand (mahatma); Sandoz, Jaques (directors)	1972	Film (documentary)	Satguru Has Come	Shri Hans Films		
	October 23, 1972	Article (newspaper)	Pilgrims jet to see Divine Light	The Times	UK, London	p. 12
	November 9, 1972	Article (newspaper)	Guru's 'Bank' Seized	Los Angeles Times (Reuters)	U.S., Los Angeles	p. A15
	November 19, 1972	Article (newspaper)	India investigates guru's finances	The Times (AP)	UK, London	p. 8
	November 27, 1972	Article (magazine)	Junior Guru	Time	U.S.	
Daniel, Leon	December 10, 1972	Article (newspaper)	15-Year-Old Hottest Star of Guru Circuit	Los Angeles Times	U.S., Los Angeles	p. C8
	1970s	Magazine	And It Is Divine	Shri Hans Productions; Divine Light Mission	U.S.	
Blue Aquarius (Bhole Ji et al.)	1973	Album (music)	Blue Aquarius	Stax: Gospel Truth Series	U.S.	GTS-2725
	February 3, 1973	Article (newspaper)	Guru's Pupil Slates Talk	Syracuse Post-Standard	U.S.	p. 3
Rawat, Prem	April 1, 1973	Article (magazine); Film	DUO proclamation and satsang	Divine Times Vol. II No. 6 by Shri Hans Productions (DLM) (film:) Shri Hans Films	U.S., Denver, Colorado	
	August 1973– September 1973	Magazine	Divine Light News	Divine Light Mission	Australia	Vol. I, Nos. 1-3
	August 8, 1973	Article (newspaper)	Guru Gets Testimonial And Some Pie in Face	The New York Times	U.S., New York	p. 43
	August 8, 1973	Article (newspaper)	15-Year Old Guru Slapped in Face by Shaving Cream Pie	Los Angeles Times (UPI)	U.S., Los Angeles	p. 2
	August 8, 1973	Article (newspaper)	Guru Set For Honor, Gets Pie In Face	Independent; Press-Telegram (UPI)	U.S., Long Beach, California	p. A-6
	September 3, 1973	Article (newspaper)	Guru Maharaj Ji: Ulcer	The Washington Post	U.S., Washington, D.C.	p. B7
	September 4, 1973	Article (newspaper)	The 'Perfect Master' from India has an ulcer	Stars and Stripes (AP)	U.S.	p. 6
Carter, Malcolm N.	September 23, 1973	Article (newspaper)	Guru Keeps Track Of Subjects With Computer	Great Bend Tribune (AP)	U.S., Kansas	p. 11
Milner, Bart	September 23, 1973	Article (newspaper)	Casting some shadows on the movement of Divine Light	The Times	UK, London	
	1973	Film	Who Is Guru Maharaj Ji	Shri Hans Productions	U.S.	
Cameron, Charles; Davis, Rennie; Rawat, Prem et al.	November 1973	Book	Who Is Guru Maharaj Ji?	Bantam Books	U.S.	
Rawat, Prem; Griffin, Merv	November 28, 1973	TV show (interview)	The Merv Griffin Show		U.S.	
Morgan, Ted	December 9, 1973	Article	Oz in the Astrodome: Middle-class premies find Guru	The New York Times Magazine	U.S., New York	Section 6, pp. 37–39, 84, 86, 88, 90, 92, 94, 96, 104
Du Plessix Gray, Francine; Kelley, Ken	December 13, 1973	Article (magazine)	Blissing out in Houston (du Plessix Gray); Blackjack Love (Kelley)	The New York Review of Books Vol. 20 No. 20	U.S., New York	pp. 36–43
Winder, Gail; Horowitz, Carol	December 1973	Article (magazine)	What's Behind the 15-Year-Old Guru Maharaj Ji?	The Realist No. 97-C	U.S., San Francisco, California	pp. 1–5
Latimer, Dean	January 1974	Article (magazine)	Who is Guru Maharaj Ji and why is he saying all these terrible things about God?	Penthouse Vol. 5 No. 5	U.S.	pp. 65–66
Kelley, Ken	January 19, 1974	Article (newspaper)	Get Your Red-Hot Panaceas!	The New York Times	U.S., New York	p. 31
Du Plessix Gray, Francine; Kelley, Ken; Apter, Joan et al.	January 24, 1974	Article (magazine)	Knowledge of the Guru, replies to Joan Apter and to Nicholas B. Dirks, Charles R. D. Lindley, Leela A. Wood	The New York Review of Books Vol. 20 Nos. 21 & 22	U.S., New York	
Kelley, Ken	February 1974	Article (magazine)	Over the hill at 16	Ramparts No. 12	U.S.	pp. 40–44
Goldsmith, Paul; Traum, Artie	February 1974	Article (magazine)	Bliss and Bones in the Astrodome	Crawdaddy	U.S.	pp. 62–65
Adler, Dick	February 23, 1974	Article (newspaper)	TV Review: Videotape Explorers on Trail of a Guru	Los Angeles Times	U.S., Los Angeles	p. B2
Shamberg, Michael (dir.); Rawat, Prem; Davis, Rennie et al.	February 24, 1974	Film (documentary)	Lord of the Universe	Top Value Television	U.S.	
O'Connor, John J.	February 25, 1974	Article (newspaper)	TV: Meditating on Young Guru and His Followers: Maharaj Ji Is Focus of P.B.S. Documentary: Astrodome Gathering Yields Splendid Show	The New York Times	U.S., New York	p. 53
Kelley, Ken	March 1974	Article (magazine)	An East Indian Teen-Ager Says He Is God	Vogue	U.S.	
Elman, Richard	March 1974	Article (magazine)	Godhead Hi-Jinx: Starring the Guru Maharaj Ji	Creem	U.S.	p. 37-39
	March 1974– October 1979	Magazine	The Golden Age	Divine Light Mission; Duo Productions	Australia	Vol. 1-55
Levine, Richard	March 14, 1974	Article (magazine)	When The Lord of All The Universe Played Houston: Many are called but few show up	Rolling Stone No. 156	U.S.	pp. 36–50
Gortner, Marjoe	May 1974	Article (magazine)	Who Was Guru Maharaj Ji? Just think of him as a spare tire	Oui	U.S.	pp. 90–133
Scheer, Robert	June 1974	Article (magazine)	Death of the Salesman: for rennie davis (model high school student, antiwar spokesman and chief proselytizer for guru maharaj ji) the media always meant the message	Playboy	U.S.	pp. 107–108, 112, 236, 238-240
Kelley, Ken	July 1974	Article (magazine)	I See The Light: In which a young journalist pushes a cream pie into the face of His Divine Fatness and gets his skull cracked open by two disciples	Penthouse	U.S.	pp. 98–100, 137-138, 146, 148, 150-151
Baxter, Ernie	August 1974	Article (magazine)	The multi-million dollar religion ripoff	Argosy No. 380	U.S.	pp. 72, 77-81
Dart, John	November 27, 1974	Article (newspaper)	Maharaj Ji Buys $400,000 Home Base in Malibu Area	Los Angeles Times	U.S., Los Angeles	p. B2
	1974	Entry in encyclopedic resource	Current Biography Yearbook: 1974, entry: "Maharaj Ji, Guru"	H. W. Wilson Company	U.S.	p. 254 ff.
Frazier, Deborah	March 23, 1975	Article (newspaper)	Growing Pile of Unpaid Bills Beneath Guru's Spiritual Bliss	Sunday Journal and Star (UPI)	U.S., Lincoln, Nebraska	p. 11A
	March 24, 1975	Article (newspaper)	Riches Called Goal of Divine Light	Winnipeg Free Press (CP)	U.S.	
	April 1, 1975	Article (newspaper)	Mother Ousts Young Guru as Playboy	Los Angeles Times	U.S., Los Angeles	p. 2
Belkind, Myron L.	April 2, 1975	Article (newspaper)	Guru's mother rejects him as religion chief	Independent; Press-Telegram (AP)	U.S., Long Beach	p. 9
	April 9, 1975	Article (newspaper)	Guru Tries to Take Control of Mission	Ruston Daily Leader	U.S.	
	April 18, 1975	Article (newspaper)	Court Halts Heiress' Money Gift To Guru	Charleston Daily Mail (API)	U.S.	
Frazier, Deborah	July 14, 1975	Article (newspaper)	Guru Maharaj Ji: Pizza, Sports Cars and Millions of Followers	Mansfield News Journal (UPI)	U.S.	
Rawat, Prem et al.	1975	Book	The Sayings of Guru Maharaj Ji	Divine United Organization; Shri Sant Yogashram, Hans Marg	India, New Delhi	Several volumes
	February 20, 1976	Article (newspaper)	Maharaj Ji Wins Fight For Mission	The Washington Post	U.S., Washington, D.C.	p. C7
Cornell, George W.	March 5, 1976	Article (newspaper)	Group Led by Teen Guru Toning Down Eastern Style	Albuquerque Journal	U.S.	
	March 6, 1976	Article (newspaper)	Spiritual group's claims, practices are changing	Evening Capital (AP)	U.S.	
Brown, Mick	April 17, 1976	Article (magazine)	Perfect Master and unholy squabbles: The Guru comes of age	Street Life	UK	pp. 18–19
Mishler, Bob; Frazier, Deborah (UPI: interviewer)	May 1976	Interview (magazine)	Part of the mainstream	The Golden Age No. 29	Australia	p. 8 ff.
Thurmond, Strom (U.S. Congress senator)	July 20, 1976	US Congressional Record	Prem Rawat's Inspirational Message to the United States Citizen's Congress	US Congress	U.S., Washington, D.C.	
Messer, Jeanne	1976	Essay in book	Guru Maharaj Ji and the Divine Light Mission	The New Religious Consciousness by Charles Y. Glock and Robert N. Bellah (eds.), University of California Press	U.S., Berkeley, California	pp. 52–72
	1977–1980s	Magazine (quarterly)	Élan Vital	Divine Light Mission	U.S.	ISSN 0195-2145
	October 19, 1977	Article (newspaper)	Guru Maharaj Ji becomes a citizen of the U.S.	Rocky Mountain News	U.S., Denver, Colorado	
Como, Don (dir.); Donovan (music); Davis, Rennie; Rawat, Prem et al.	1977	Film (part)	Aliens from Spaceship Earth		U.S.	
Stoner, Carroll; Parke, Jo Anne	1977	Book (part)	All Gods Children: The Cult Experience - Salvation Or Slavery?	Chilton	U.S.	ISBN 0-8019-6620-5
Foss, Daniel A. Larkin, Ralph W.	1978	Essay in periodical	Worshiping the Absurd: The Negation of Social Causality among the Followers of Guru Maharaj Ji	Sociological Analysis Vol. 39 No. 2 by Association for the Sociology of Religion	U.S.	doi:10.2307/3710215, pp. 157-164
Rawat, Prem	1978	Book	The Living Master: quotes from Guru Maharaj Ji	Divine Light Mission	U.S., Denver	
Collier, Sophia	1978	Book (autobiography)	Soul Rush: The Odyssey of a Young Woman of the '70s	William Morrow & Co.	U.S., New York	ISBN 0-688-03276-1
Pilarzyk, Thomas	1978	Essay in periodical	The Origin, Development, and Decline of a Youth Culture Religion: An Application of Sectarianization Theory	Review of Religious Research Vol. 20 No. 1 by Religious Research Association	U.S.	pp. 23–43
	1978; 2001	Book (part)	Religious Requirements and Practices of Certain Selected Groups: A Handbook for Chaplains; Army Pamphlet 165-13	U.S. Department of the Army; Kirchner Associates (2001:) The Minerva Group	U.S.	(2001:) ISBN 0-89875-607-3 p. II-5 ff.
Forster, Mark	January 12, 1979	Article (newspaper)	Firm Loyalty: Guru's Sect: Misgivings in Malibu; Malibu Guru Maintains Following Despite Rising Mistrust of Cults	Los Angeles Times	U.S., Los Angeles	p. A1, 3,...
Mishler, Bob; Tesler, Gary et al.	February 12, 1979	Interview (radio)	Bob Mishler Radio Interview	KOA radio station	U.S., Denver, Colorado	
Downton, James V., Jr.	July 1979	Book (monography)	Sacred journeys: The conversion of young Americans to Divine Light Mission	Columbia University Press	U.S., Columbia	ISBN 0-231-04198-5
Kemeny, Jim	1979	Essay in periodical	Comment: On Foss, Daniel A. and Ralph W. Larkin. 1978. "Worshiping the Absurd: The Negation of Social Causality among the Followers of Guru Maharaj Ji." Sociological Analysis 39, 2: 157-164	Sociological Analysis Vol. 40 No. 3 by Association for the Sociology of Religion	U.S.	pp. 262–264
Nelson, G. K.	1979	Essay in periodical	A Comment on Pilarzyk's Article "The Origin, Development and Decline of a Youth Culture Religion" (RRR, Fall, 1978)	Review of Religious Research Vol. 21 No. 1	U.S.	pp. 108–109
Pilarzyk, Thomas	1979	Essay in periodical	The Cultic Resilience of the Divine Light Mission: A Reply to Nelson	Review of Religious Research Vol. 21 No. 1	U.S.	pp. 109–112
Price, Maeve	1979	Essay in periodical	The Divine Light Mission as a social organization	The Sociological Review Vol. 27	UK, Keele, Staffordshire	pp. 279–296
Galanter, Marc; Buckley, P.	1979	Essay in periodical	Mystical Experience, spiritual knowledge, and a contemporary ecstatic religion	British Journal of Medical Psychology No. 52	UK	pp. 281–289
Davis, Ivor	December 19, 1979	Article (newspaper)	Malibu opposes plan to build heliport for Divine Light guru	The Times	UK, London	p. 12
Rawat, Prem	1980	Book	Light Reading	Divine Light Mission	U.S., Miami Beach	
Rudin, James A. Rudin, Marcia R.	June 1980	Book (part)	Prison or Paradise?: The New Religious Cults	Fortress Press	U.S., Philadelphia	ISBN 0-8006-0637-X p.63-65
Robbins, Thomas; Anthony, Dick	1980	Essay in periodical	The Limits of 'Coercive Persuasion' as an Explanation for Conversion to Authoritarian Sects	Political Psychology Vol. 2 No. 2 by International Society of Political Psychology	U.S., New York	pp. 22–37
Stones, C. R. Philbrick, J. I.	1980	Essay in periodical	Purpose in Life in South Africa: A Comparison of American and South African Beliefs	Psychological Reports Vol. 47	South Africa	pp. 739–742
Aagaard, Johannes	1980	Article (periodical)	Who Is Who In Guruism?	Update: A Quarterly Journal on New Religious Movements Vol. IV No. 3 by Dialogcentret	Denmark	
Kriegman, Daniel	1980	Book (part)	A Psycho-social Study of Religious Cults From the Perspective of Self Psychology, Appendix A: "The Guru Mahara Ji Group: An experiential description: the journey to God"	Boston University	U.S.	Doctoral dissertation pp. 164–188 references: pp. 218–220
Downton, James V., Jr.	December 1980	Essay in periodical	An Evolutionary Theory of Spiritual Conversion and Commitment: The Case of Divine Light Mission	Journal for the Scientific Study of Religion Vol. 19 No. 4	U.S. UK	ISSN 0021-8294 pp. 381–396
Lammers, Jos	February 14, 1981	Article (magazine)	Het concern van Guru Maharaj ji: Vijf jaar zakenman in dienst van de verlichting	Haagse Post Vol. 68 No. 7 (in Dutch)	Netherlands, The Hague	pp. 48–53
	May 22, 1981	Article (newspaper)	1-Year Trial OKd for Sect's Helipad	Los Angeles Times	U.S., Los Angeles	p. F6
Godfrey (justice)	October 19, 1981	Court decision	Dotter v. Maine Employment Sec. Commission	Supreme Judicial Court of Maine	U.S., Maine	Case 435 A.2d 1368
McGuire, Meredith B.	1981; 2002^{5}	Book (part)	Religion: the Social Context Ch. 5 "The Dynamics of Religious Collectivities", section "How Religious Collectivities Develop and Change", sub-section "Organizational Transformations"	Wadsworth	U.S.	ISBN 0-534-00951-4^{5}ISBN 0-534-54126-7 p. 175
Robbins, Thomas; Anthony, Dick	February 1982	Essay in periodical	Deprogramming, Brainwashing and the Medicalization of Deviant Religious Groups	Social Problems Vol. 29 No. 3. by Society for the Study of Social Problems; University of California Press	U.S.	pp. 283-297
Brown, Chip	February 15, 1982	Article (newspaper)	Parents Versus Cult: Frustration, Kidnaping, Tears; A Question of Will: Law-Abiding Couple ... Who Became Kidnapers to Rescue Daughter from Her Guru	The Washington Post	U.S., Washington, D.C.	p. A1
Schwartz, Lita Linzer; Kaslow, Florence W.	June 7, 1982	Essay in periodical	The Cult Phenomenon: Historical, Sociological, and Familial Factors Contributing to Their Development and Appeal	Marriage & Family Review Volume 4 Issue 3-4; Haworth Press	U.S.	ISSN 0149-4929 pp. 3–30
Robbins, Thomas; Anthony, Dick	June 7, 1982	Essay in periodical	Cults, Culture, and Community	Marriage & Family Review Volume 4 Issue 3-4; Haworth Press	U.S.	ISSN 0149-4929 pp. 57–79
Ottenberg, Donald J.	June 7, 1982	Essay in periodical	Therapeutic Community and the Danger of the Cult Phenomenon	Marriage & Family Review Volume 4 Issue 3-4; Haworth Press	U.S.	ISSN 0149-4929 pp. 151–173
Kranenborg, Reender	1982	Book (part)	Oosterse Geloofsbewegingen in het Westen		Netherlands (in Dutch)	ISBN 90-210-4965-1
Schnabel, Paul	1982 (2007)	Book (part)	Tussen stigma en charisma: nieuwe religieuze bewegingen en geestelijke volksgezondheid	Van Loghum Slaterus; Digital library for Dutch literature	Netherlands (in Dutch)	ISBN 90-6001-746-3, p. 32, p. 53, p. 99, 101-102, p. 142
	October 6, 1983	Article (periodical)	Whatever Happened to Guru Maharaj Ji?	Hinduism Today by Himalayan Academy	U.S.	ISSN 0896-0801
Lans, Jan M. van der Derks, Frans	1984	Essay in book	Subgroups in Divine Light Mission Membership: A Comment on Downton	Of Gods and Men: New Religious Movements in the West by Eileen Barker, ed. Mercer University Press	U.S., Macon, GA	ISBN 0-86554-095-0 pp. 303-308
Chagnon, Roland	January 1985	Book (part)	Trois nouvelles religions de la lumière et du son: la Science de la spiritualité, Eckankar, la Mission de la lumière divine	Paulines; Médiaspaul (in French)	Canada, Montréal; France, Paris	ISBN 2-89039-985-0
Kriegman, Daniel; Solomon, L.	April 1985	Essay in periodical	Cult groups and the narcissistic personality: The offer to heal defects in the self	International Journal of Group Psychotherapy Vol. 35 No. 2	U.S.	pp. 239–261
Pasternak, Judy	July 7, 1985	Article (newspaper)	Maharaji Denied in Bid to Triple Copter Use	Los Angeles Times	U.S., Los Angeles	p. 1
Melton, J. Gordon	1986^{rev}	Entry in encyclopedic resource	Encyclopedic Handbook of Cults in America, entry: "Divine Light Mission"	Garland	U.S., New York; UK, London	ISBN 0-8240-9036-5, pp. 141–145
Lans, Jan M. van der Derks, Frans	June 14, 1986	Essay in periodical	Premies Versus Sannyasins	Update: A Quarterly Journal on New Religious Movements Vol. X No. 2 by Dialogcentret	Denmark	
DuPertuis, Lucy	1986	Essay in periodical	How People Recognize Charisma: The Case of Darshan in Radhasoami and Divine Light Mission	Sociological Analysis: A Journal in the Sociology of Religion Vol. 47 No. 2 by Association for the Sociology of Religion	U.S., Chicago	ISSN 0038-0210 pp. 111-124
Sharma, Arvind	1986	Essay in book	New Hindu Religious Movements in India	New Religious Movements and Rapid Social Change by James A. Beckford; Unesco/Sage Publications	UK, London	ISBN 0-8039-8003-5, p. 224
Galanter, Marc	May 4, 1989; 1999^{2}	Book (part)	Cults: Faith, Healing and Coercion	Oxford University Press	U.S.	ISBN 0-19-505631-0^{2}ISBN 0-19-512369-7^{2}ISBN 0-19-512370-0
Tucker, Ruth A.	1989; 1991; 2004	Book (part)	Another Gospel: alternative religions and the new age movement (1989); Strange Gospels: a comprehensive survey of cults, alternative religions and the New Age movement (1991); Another Gospel: Cults, Alternative Religions, and the New Age Movement (2004)	Academie Books (1989); Zondervan (1989, 2004); Marshall Pickering, Harpercollins (1991)	U.S. (1989, 2004); UK (1991)	ISBN 0-310-40440-1 (1989); ISBN 0-551-02277-9 (1991); ISBN 0-310-25937-1 (2004) p. 320, p. 364-365
Björkqvist, Kaj	1990	Essay	World-rejection, world-affirmation, and goal displacement: some aspects of change in three new religious movements of Hindu origin	Encounter with India: Studies in Neohinduism (Nils G. Holm, ed.); Åbo Akademi	Finland	ISBN 951-649-731-4, pp. 79-99
McIlwain, Doris J. F.	1990; June 2006	Book (part)	Impatient for paradise: a rites of passage model of the role of the psychological predispositions in determining differential openness to involvement in new religious movements	University of Sydney; Sydney eScholarship Repository	Australia, Sydney	PhD Doctorate
Melton, J. Gordon	1991 (March 1999^{2}) (2008)	Entry in encyclopedic resource	Religious Leaders of America, entry: "Guru Maharaj Ji"	Gale; ^{2}Gale Group (2008:) Biography Resource Center	U.S., Michigan	pp. 285–286.^{2}ISBN 0-8103-8878-2
Juergensmeyer, Mark	1991; 1996	Book (part)	Radhasoami Reality: The Logic of a Modern Faith	Princeton University Press	U.S.	ISBN 0-691-07378-3; ISBN 0-691-01092-7 pp. 206–207
Mangalwadi, Vishal; Hoeksema, Kurt	1992^{2}	Book (part)	The world of gurus: a critical look at the philosophies of India’s influential gurus and mystics.	Cornerstone Press	U.S., Chicago	ISBN 0-940895-03-X (revised edition), pp. 137–138
Melton, J. Gordon (Project Director); Lewis, James R. et al.	1993	Book (part)	Religious Requirements and Practices of Certain Selected Groups: A Handbook for Chaplains	The Institute for the Study of American Religion	U.S.	chapter on Sikh/Sant Mat Groups, section: Elan Vital
Barbour, John D.	1994	Book (part)	Versions of Deconversion: Autobiography and the Loss of Faith	University of Virginia Press	U.S.	ISBN 0-8139-1546-5 p. 170 ff.
Gest, Alain et al.	December 22, 1995	Report (government)	N° 2468: Rapport Fait au nom de la commission d'enquête sur les sectes, Ch. I.B: "Un phénomène difficile à mesurer"	National Assembly, Parliamentary Commission on Cults (1995) (in French)	France	p. 14 ff.
Melton, J. Gordon (ed.)^{5}Shepard, Leslie (ed.)	1996^{4} (November 2000^{5}) (2008)	Entry in encyclopedic resource	Encyclopedia of Occultism and Parapsychology, entry: "Maharaj Ji, Guru"	Gale; ^{5}Thomson Gale (2008:) Biography Resource Center	U.S.	^{4}p. 803^{5}ISBN 0-8103-8570-8
Winter, Mark et al	July 17, 1996	Magazine (special edition)	The Divine Times: Special Edition July 17, 1996			
Scheer, Robert	April 1, 1997	Article (newspaper)	How I Was Stood Up by the Venusians: Even a brief encounter with a cult's absurdity reveals its power to attract	Los Angeles Times	U.S., Los Angeles	p. 7
Brauns, John et al.	1997–	Web site	Ex-Premie.org			
Jones, Rebecca	January 30, 1998	Article (newspaper)	Former Guru on a Different Mission	Rocky Mountain News	U.S., Denver, Colorado	
Lewis, James R.	November 1, 1998^{2}2005	Entry in encyclopedic resource	Cults ^{1}[in America]: A Reference Handbook, entries "Elan Vital (Divine Light Mission)" and "Maharaji (b. 1957)"	ABC-Clio, Contemporary World Issues series	U.S.	ISBN 1-57607-031-X^{2}ISBN 1-85109-618-3 pp. 84-85, 121-122, 286-287, 307-308
Richardson, James T.	1998	Entry in encyclopedic resource	Encyclopedia of Religion and Society (William H. Swatos, Jr., ed.), entry: "Divine Light Mission"	AltaMira Press; Sage publications	U.S. UK; India	ISBN 0-7619-8956-0, p. 141
Melton, J. Gordon	1999	Essay	Brainwashing and the Cults: The Rise and Fall of a Theory in forthcoming The Brainwashing Controversy: An Anthology of Essential Documents	CESNUR	Italy	
Abgrall, Jean-Marie	2000	Book (part)	Soul Snatchers: The Mechanics of Cults	U.S., New York	Algora Publishing	ISBN 1-892941-04-X p. 285
Rhodes, Ron	2001	Book (part)	The Challenge of the Cults and New Religions: The Essential Guide to Their History, Their Doctrine, and Our Response	Zondervan	U.S.	ISBN 0-310-23217-1 pp. 32, 170
Barrett, David V.	2001; May 2003	Book (part)	The New Believers: Sects, 'Cults' and Alternative Religions	Cassell	UK	ISBN 0-304-35592-5; ISBN 1-84403-040-7 p. 65; Part Two: Alternative Religions & Other Groups, Ch. 14: Eastern Movements in the West, Elan Vital, p. 325-329
Kent, Stephen A.	October 2001	Book (part)	From Slogans to Mantras: Social Protest and Religious Conversion in the Late Vietnam War Era	Syracuse University Press	U.S.	ISBN 0-8156-2923-0; ISBN 0-8156-2948-6
Hassan, Steve et al.	2001–	Web page	Elan Vital	Steven Alan Hassan's Freedom of Mind Center	U.S.	
Macgregor, John	August 31, 2002	Article (magazine)	Blinded by the Light	Good Weekend	Australia, Sydney	pp. 38–42
Geaves, Ron	2002; March 2004	Essay	From Divine Light Mission to Elan Vital and Beyond: an Exploration of Change and Adaptation	2002 International Conference on Minority Religions, Social Change and Freedom of Conscience at University of Utah (2004:) Nova Religio: The Journal of Alternative and Emergent Religions Vol. 7 No. 3	U.S., Salt Lake City (2004:) U.S.	(2004:) pp. 45–62
Rawat, Prem et al.	2003–	TV series	Words of Peace		South America; North America; Europe; Satellite	
Rawat, Prem	2003	Book	Clarity	The Prem Rawat Foundation	U.S.	ISBN 0-9740627-1-5
	2003	Essay	"Premies" Complain to Google of "Ex-Premie.org" site	Chilling Effects	U.S.	
	2003-07	Entry in encyclopedic resource	The Houghton Mifflin Dictionary of Biography, entry: "Maharaj Ji"	Houghton Mifflin	U.S.	ISBN 0-618-25210-X p. 994
Jackson, Sally	March 11, 2004	Article (newspaper)	Court lets 'cult' gag journalist	The Australian	Australia	p. 21
O’Regan, Mick (host); Macgregor, John et al.	March 18, 2004	Interview (radio)	Suppression Orders & the Media	The Media Report on ABC Radio National	Australia	
Thomas, Hedley	April 24, 2004	Article (newspaper)	Peace at a price	The Courier-Mail	Australia, Brisbane	p. 35
	November 29, 2004	Press release	Words of Peace by Prem Rawat receives TV Award in Brazil	tprf.net Press Room by The Prem Rawat Foundation	U.S.	
Rawat, Prem; Wolf, Burt (interviewer)	2005	Interview (DVD)	Inner Journey: A Spirited Conversation About Self-discovery	The Prem Rawat Foundation	U.S.	OCLC 85767576; ASIN B000EDUGI4
Rawat, Prem	May 17, 2005	Public Address	Maharaji at Thamamssat University	Wikisource (transcript: 2006)	Thailand, Bangkok	
	June 30, 2005	Article (newspaper)	US names June 16 after Indian.	Times of India	India	
	2006	Web page	About Us	Raj Vidya Kender	India	
Geaves, Ron	2006	Essay in periodical	Globalization, charisma, innovation, and tradition: An exploration of the transformations in the organisational vehicles for the transmission of the teachings of Prem Rawat (Maharaji)	Journal of Alternative Spiritualities and New Age Studies Vol. 2 by Alternative Spiritualities and New Age Studies Association	UK	ISBN 978-1-4196-2696-8 pp. 44–62
Mather, George; Nichols, Larry A. Schmidt, Alvin J.	August 1, 2006	Entry in encyclopedic resource	Encyclopedic Dictionary of Cults, Sects, and World Religions: Revised and Updated Edition, entry "Elan Vital / Divine Light Mission"	Zondervan	U.S.	ISBN 0-310-23954-0
Geaves, Ron	October 30, 2006	Essay in book	From Guru Maharaj Ji to Prem Rawat: Paradigm Shifts over the Period of Forty Years as a "Master" (1966-2006)	Introduction to New and Alternative Religions in America by Eugene V. Gallagher and W. Michael Ashcraft (eds.), Vol. IV: Asian Traditions, Greenwood Publishing Group	US	ISBN 0-275-98712-4 pp. 63–84
	December 20, 2006	Newsletter (digital)	Prem Rawat’s “Words of Peace” Receives Brazilian TV Award	Inspire by The Prem Rawat Foundation	U.S.	
Cagan, Andrea	January 16, 2007	Book (biography)	Peace is Possible: The Life and Message of Prem Rawat	Mighty River Press	U.S.	ISBN 0-9788694-9-4; OCLC 123014238
Mendick, Robert	May 31, 2007	Article (newspaper)	Cult leader gives cash to Lord Mayor appeal	Evening Standard	UK, London	p. 4
Rawat, Prem et al.	June 1, 2007	Public address	Prem Rawat at Guildhall, London	The Prem Rawat Foundation (DVD release)	UK, London	
Rossiter, Joe	November 25, 2007	Article (newspaper)	Patrick Halley: Outgoing reporter lived colorful life	Detroit Free Press	U.S., Detroit	
Mendick, Robert	November 30, 2007; December 2, 2007	Article (newspaper)	Guru followers asked to target Gandhi party	Evening Standard; Gulf Times	UK, London; Qatar, Doha	
Rawat, Prem; Robles, Marta (interviewer)	2007	Interview (DVD)	Journey Within: a conversation between journalist Marta Robles and Prem Rawat, Barcelona, Spain	The Prem Rawat Foundation		
Bromley, David G.	2007	Book (part)	Teaching New Religious Movements	Aar Teaching Religious Studies Series by American Academy of Religion	U.S.	ISBN 0-19-517729-0
Metz, Cade	February 6, 2008	Article (magazine)	Wikipedia ruled by 'Lord of the Universe'	The Register	UK	
Finch, Michael	2009	Book	Without the Guru: How I Took My Life Back After Thirty Years	BookSurge Publishing	U.S.	ISBN 1-4392-4504-5 ISBN 978-1-4392-4504-0
