= Outline of Prem Rawat =

This list is of topics related to Prem Rawat (Maharaji).

Prem Pal Singh Rawat (born 10 December 1957), formerly known as Maharaji, is an Indian international speaker and author. His teachings include a meditation practice he calls "Knowledge", and peace education based on the discovery of personal resources such as inner strength, choice, appreciation and hope.

== Organizations ==
- Elan Vital
- Divine Light Mission
- Divine United Organization/Raj Vidya Kender
- HDSK
- Words of Peace Global
- The Prem Rawat Foundation

== Practices ==
- Teachings of Prem Rawat

== Family ==
- Hans Ram Singh Rawat, known as Hans Ji Maharaj, father
- Satpal Singh Rawat, known as Satpal Maharaj, brother
- Amrita Rawat, sister-in-law, wife of Satpal
- Actress Navi Rawat, niece, daughter of brother Rajaji Rawat

== Notable students, past and present ==
- Jonathan Cainer, astrologer
- Sophia Collier, author of the 1978 book Soul Rush: The Odyssey of a Young Woman of the '70s
- Rennie Davis, prominent American anti-Vietnam War protest leader of the 1960s, one of the Chicago Seven defendants
- Timothy Gallwey, author of the series of books The Inner Game
- Ron Geaves, scholar
- Jimmie Dale Gilmore, singer, songwriter
- John Grefe, chess master
- Jenny McLeod, composer

== Books ==
- Sacred Journeys
- Soul Rush
- Who Is Guru Maharaj Ji?

== Scholarly analysts ==
Students of Prem Rawat

- Lucy DuPertuis
- Ron Geaves, senior lecturer, Programme Leader and chair in religious studies at the University of Chester in England
- Jeanne Messer

Others

- David V. Barrett, American author who has written on religious and esoteric topics
- James V. Downton, professor at Sacramento State College and professor emeritus of Sociology at the College of Arts and Sciences of the University of Colorado at Boulder
- George D. Chryssides, senior lecturer and Head of Religious Studies at the School of Humanities, Languages and Social Sciences of the University of Wolverhampton
- Daniel A. Foss
- Marc Galanter
- Jeffrey K. Hadden, professor of sociology at the University of Virginia
- Stephen J. Hunt, British professor of sociology at the University of the West of England
- Andrew Kopkind, radical American journalist
- Stephen A. Kent, professor in the Department of Sociology at the University of Alberta
- Reender Kranenborg, Dutch theologian specialized in sociology of religion and Hinduism
- Jan van der Lans, Dutch professor in the psychology of religion at the Catholic University of Nijmegen
- Ralph Larkin
- Saul V. Levine, professor of psychiatry at the University of Toronto; author
- J. Gordon Melton, American religious scholar and research specialist in religion and new religious movements at the University of California, Santa Barbara
- Paul Schnabel, Dutch sociologist and director of Sociaal en Cultureel Planbureau of the Dutch government
- Margaret Singer, clinical psychologist and adjunct professor emeritus of psychology at the University of California, Berkeley, US
- Bryan R. Wilson, Reader Emeritus in Sociology at the University of Oxford and President of the International Society for the Sociology of Religion

== Media ==
- Lord of the Universe, documentary, 1974, won a DuPont-Columbia Award
- Words of Peace TV series

== Interviewers ==
- Marta Robles (2006)
- Rajiv Mehrotra, Doordarshan TV, (2006)
- Carmen Posadas, writer, (2004)
- Burt Wolf (2000)
- Tom Snyder, The Tomorrow Show, (1973)
- John Wood, the Boston Globe (1973)

== Biographers ==
- Andrea Cagan, best-selling American writer and biographer

== Multimedia ==
=== Photographs ===
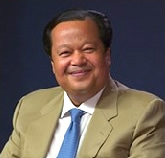
Prem Rawat, present

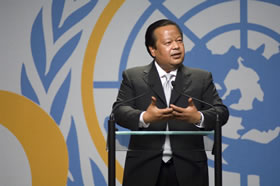
Speaking at U.N. anniversary event, San Francisco, 2005

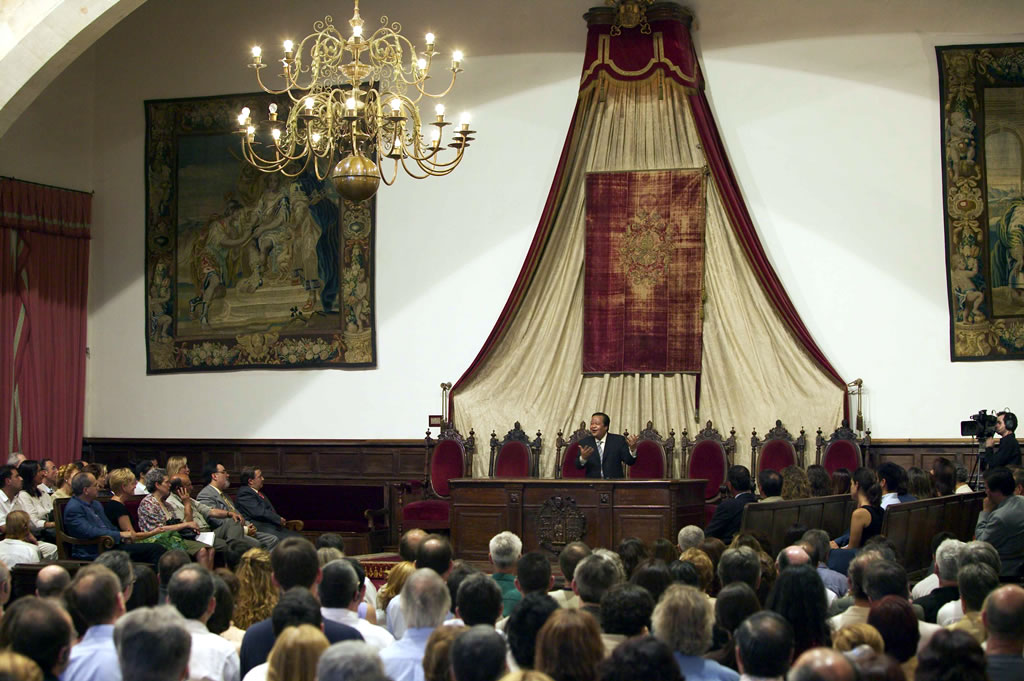
Public address, University of Salamanca, 2003

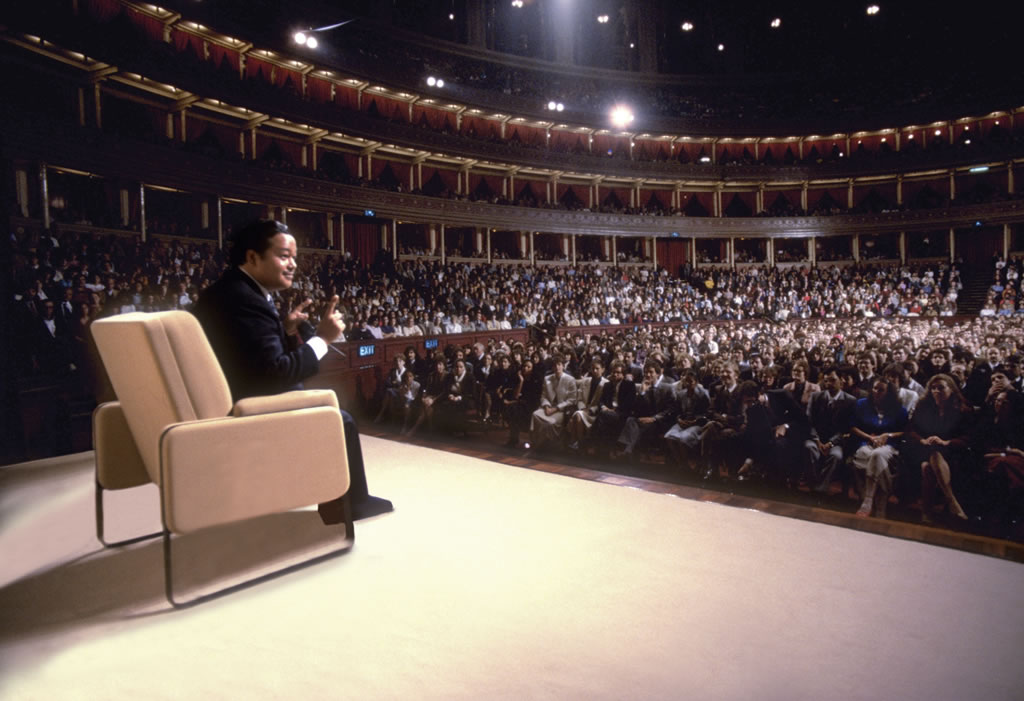
Public address, Royal Albert Hall, 1981

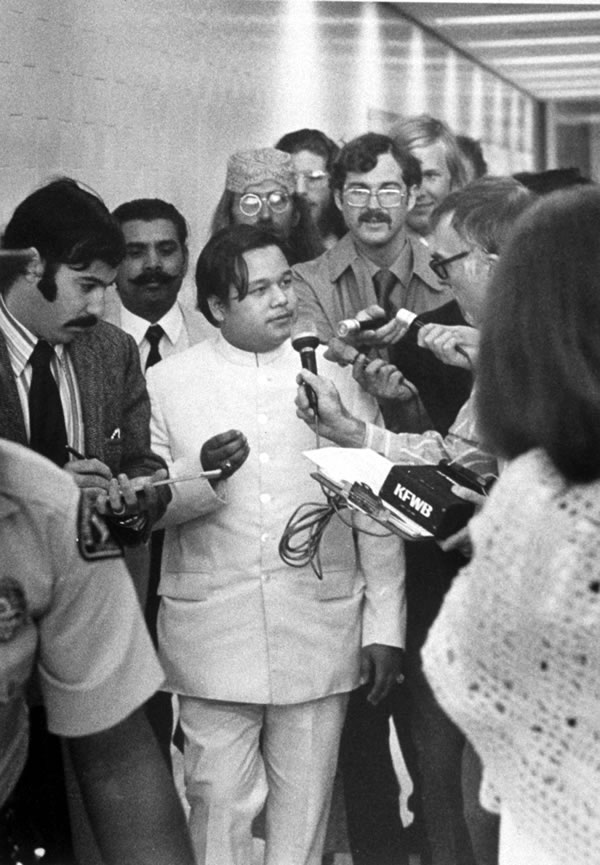
Arriving in United States, 1971

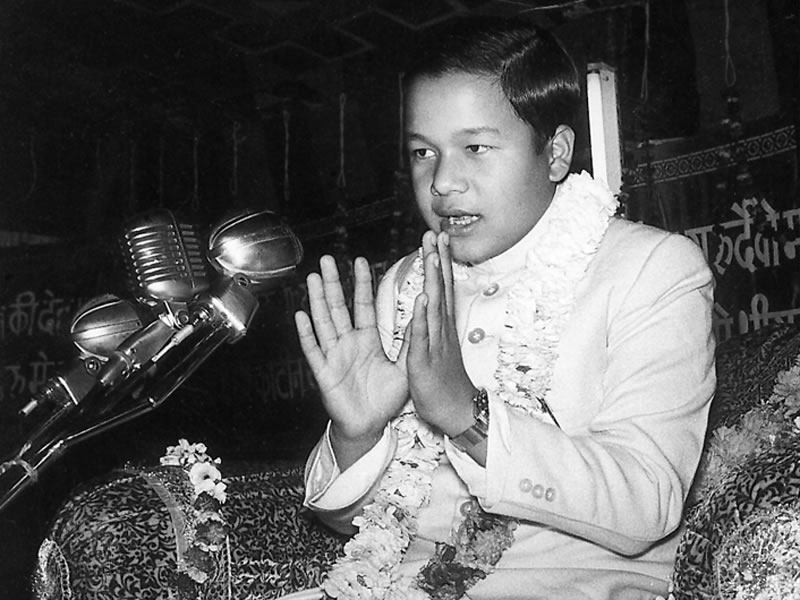
Maharaji, circa 1967

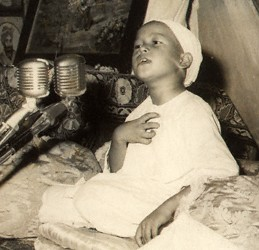
Prem Rawat in 1966

=== Audio ===
Prem Rawat at the United Nations' 60th anniversary.
Excerpt of Maharaji's address.

== Other articles of interest ==
- Advait Mat
- Charismatic authority
- Guru
- Kriya
- Sant Mat
- Satguru
- Shabd
- Surat Shabda Yoga
