= Teachings of Prem Rawat =

The core of Prem Rawat's teaching is that the individual’s need for fulfillment can be satisfied by turning within to contact a constant source of peace and joy. Rather than a body of dogma, he emphasizes a direct experience of transcendence, which he claims is accessible through the four techniques of meditation which he teaches. He calls these techniques "Knowledge" and says that Knowledge will take "all your senses that have been going outside all your life, turn them around and put them inside to feel and to actually experience you."

In his public speeches he quotes from Hindu, Muslim and Christian sources, but he relies on the experience provided by the four meditation techniques for his inspiration and guidance. According to scholar and follower Ron Geaves, this lack of professed concepts allows his followers a freedom of expression which is spontaneous and personal. Rawat places no outer requirements or prohibitions on those taught the techniques, nor does he regard himself as an exemplary leader. Practitioners are asked not to reveal these techniques to anyone else, but to allow others to prepare to receive the experience for themselves. Rawat has been criticized for a lack of intellectual content in his public discourses.

== History ==
Scholars have asserted that Prem Rawat's teachings originate in the traditions of the North Indian Sants, who dismiss all religious ritual and dogma and emphasize the possibility of a direct experience of God, who, they claim, "dwells in the heart". Theologically, their teachings are distinguished by an inward, loving devotion to a divine principle, and socially by an egalitarianism that is opposed to the qualitative distinctions of the Hindu caste system. Sants believe that the Guru or Perfect Master is an embodiment of God and a fitting object of worship. Some of the more notable Sant gurus include Namdev (d.1350), Kabir (d.1518), Nanak (d.1539), Mirabai (d.1545), Surdas (d.1573), Tulsidas (d.1623), and Tukaram (d. 1650). Other scholars refer to affinities with medieval traditions of Nirguna Bhakti (Sanskrit = "formless devotion"), with a similar emphasis on universalism, equality and direct experience, and criticism of blind allegiance to religious ritual and dogma. Hans Ji Maharaj, Rawat's father and guru, was a devotee of Swarupanand, and became a guru in 1936 on Swarupanand's death. He began presenting his message and teaching the techniques of Knowledge in the small town of Najibabad, near Haridwar. His talks were strongly influenced by the reformist philosophy of the Arya Samaj, and he viewed himself primarily as the "Guru of the Poor". His teachings were rich in metaphor and more concerned with practical applications than theory. Unusually for an Indian teacher, he accepted students irrespective of caste, religion or status, and drew his share of criticism from traditional Hindus. In 1936 he published a book Hans Yog Prakash as a first step to broadening the dissemination of his message.

== Teachings ==
Prem Rawat did not inherit a formal set of teachings nor did he develop one, as he sees conceptual thinking as the main enemy of the direct religious experience which he claims can be obtained through the techniques of Knowledge. His central claim is that God resides in every human being and the human quest for fulfillment can be resolved by turning inward to discover a constant source of contentment and joy. He gives equal billing to all religions, quoting from Hindu, Muslim and Christian sources, but rather than rely on scriptures for inspiration and guidance, Rawat relies on the experience provided by the four techniques of Knowledge. This lack of professed concepts allow his followers a freedom of expression which is spontaneous and personal. Neither in the time of the father, Shri Hans, nor in that of the son, did the Divine Light Mission possess a systematically developed set of teachings. Both saw [doctrines] as presenting more problems than advantages ... The young Guru explains that conceptual thinking, translated with the English word “mind” in German translations also, is the main enemy of direct religious experience. It is therefore hardly surprising that little firm information about DLM teachings can be obtained from his followers. On the other hand, the lack of professed concepts allows them a freedom of expression which is spontaneous and personal, and which makes an agreeable contrast with the unexamined reproduction of received teachings [such as are found in other Indian-inspired groups.]</ref>

In 1972 Rawat relocated to the U.S. and while his teachings remained essentially Hindu in origin and he continued with many Indian traditions, he managed with the minimum of Hindu terms and concepts, keeping his main emphasis on an individual, subjective experience. His first western discourses were criticized by some religious scholars as evangelical and lacking in substance and for stressing direct experience over intellect or religious conceptual thinking.

A reporter at an appearance in Boston described Rawat as "...a real human being. He spoke humbly, conversationally, and without any apparent notion that he was God. In fact he seemed to consciously undercut the divine stage show and the passionate words said in his honor. Devotees and mahatmas speak of him as the guy who will out-Christ Christ, yet the guru himself claims, not that he is divine, but that his Knowledge is". Sociologist James Downton observed that from his early beginnings Rawat appealed to his followers to give up the concepts and beliefs that might impede them from fully experiencing the "Knowledge" or life force, but this did not prevent them from adopting a fairly rigid set of ideas about his divinity, and to project millennial preconceptions onto him and the movement. Stephen A. Kent, in the preface of his book From Slogans to Mantras, described his disappointment at hearing what he considered to be a poorly delivered and banal message by Rawat in 1974, and was surprised that his companions spoke glowingly about the same message.

Prem Rawat has never asked for payment for teaching Knowledge but it was reported that in the 1970s, some Indian mahatmas asked would-be initiates to empty their pockets and give what they had prior to receiving Knowledge. In 1974, Rawat began using Western initiators to teach the techniques of Knowledge and continued to transform his teachings in order to appeal to a Western context.

By the early 1980s Prem Rawat had dropped the title "Guru" and eliminated the last of the Indian aspects. Rawat does not see himself as bound by conventional beliefs or practices of any institutionalized religion or tradition-honored world view. He is essentially an iconoclast who plots his route by pragmatic decisions to meet the demands and challenges that occur in his public career as a teacher striving to convince people of the value of self-knowledge. Rawat claims that practicing Knowledge will allow the practitioner to experience joy, self-understanding, calmness, peace and contentment. Practitioners describe Knowledge as internal and highly individual, with no associated social structure, liturgy, ethical practices or articles of faith. According to Ron Geaves, Rawat speaks spontaneously, with an emphasis on an individual's subjective experience rather than on a body of theoretical knowledge, and he draws upon real life experiences, including his own, rather than on interpretations of the scriptures. He is uncluttered by tradition in the manner of a contemporary Kabir or Nanak. Rawat advises students that for maximum benefit the techniques should be practised daily for at least one hour. He does not demand obedience, in that no outer requirements or prohibitions are placed on those taught the techniques. The axiom, 'If you like it, practice it; if you don’t, try something else,' is frequently given in his public discourses. Neither does Prem Rawat regard himself as an exemplary leader, a role often ascribed to religious founders.

The experience of Knowledge is described by practitioners as internal and highly individual. The techniques are to be practised privately, and have no related social structure or hierarchy. According to students, there is no liturgy or social obligation involved. They also say that the techniques are universally applicable and their practice has no impact on, or relationship to, a student's gender, race, sexual orientation, economic status, religion, or national origin.

=== Techniques of Knowledge ===
According to the Dutch religious scholar and Christian minister Reender Kranenborg and the American religious scholar J. Gordon Melton, the techniques of Knowledge are secret and were originally called "Light", "Sound", "Name" (or "Word") and "Nectar", but Maharaji now refers to them as the 1st, 2nd, 3rd and 4th techniques. Rawat asks practitioners to promise "not to reveal these techniques to anyone", but says to "let other people go through their own journey ... [so] they, too, can have the techniques when they are ready."

Kranenborg and Melton provide differing details of them in their writings but agree on a general description of the practices. "Light" involves careful pressure on the eyes, seeking to open the "third eye" after a long period of training and practice. This is comparable to similar Tantric practices. "Sound" involves positioning the hands over the ears and temples, with the goal of hearing the "heavenly music". This is reported to be related to sabda-brahman meditation. "Name" or "Word" is a meditation concentrating on breath. "Nectar" involves tongue positioning, eventually leading the student to taste the "nectar of life". Michael Drury describes these techniques as helping the practitioner to develop "a deep and spiritual self-knowledge."

=== Teaching Knowledge / The Keys ===
In his early days in the West, Prem Rawat or his Mahatmas (renamed to "Initiators" in 1974) conducted "Knowledge Sessions" face-to-face in small groups. From 2001 the techniques were taught via a multimedia presentation made by Rawat. In 2005, Prem Rawat introduced "The Keys", a program of five DVD's which prepare the student for receiving Knowledge. The techniques are taught in Key Six. A request from a practitioner who feels they are ready to view Key Six will result in an invitation to a Knowledge Session. It is available in more than 50 languages (of which he speaks five himself: English, Hindi, Nepali, Spanish and Italian; the other languages are dubbed). In this presentation, Maharaji explains the techniques step-by-step, to ensure that they are understood and practiced correctly. This process takes 2½ hours, of which one hour is dedicated to practicing the techniques, 15 minutes each. Before the presentation starts, people are asked to keep three promises: a) to keep in touch, b) to give Knowledge a fair chance, and c) to not share these techniques with anyone. If attendees agree with these three promises they are invited to stay and receive "the gift of Knowledge."

The Knowledge Sessions are facilitated by volunteers who operate the video equipment and ensure the comfort of the attendees. Knowledge Sessions are available throughout the year in most Western countries. In special cases, such as people who are in hospitals etc., or are otherwise bed-ridden, the volunteers go to them to conduct the Session.

== Reception ==
=== Scholars ===
George D. Chryssides writes that the Knowledge according to Prem Rawat was based on self-understanding, providing the practitioner with calmness, peace, and contentment, as the inner-self is identical with the divine. Rawat emphasizes that this Knowledge is universal, not Indian, in nature.

Ron Geaves, who specializes in studies in comparative religion at Liverpool Hope University in England and who is one of the Western students of Prem Rawat, writes that Prem Rawat himself has stated that he does not consider himself to be a charismatic figure, preferring to refer to his teachings and the efficacy of the practice of the four techniques on the individual as the basis of his authority. The showing of the four techniques replaces the traditional diksha, and although it marks the sealing of master/disciple relationship, that is not emphasized in the session itself. Rather, the focus is on correct practice and staying in touch through participation or listening. Prem Rawat’s teachings make no reference to any traditional authority, neither person nor text.

Stephen J. Hunt describes Rawat's major focus as being on stillness, peace and contentment within the individual, and his 'Knowledge' consists of the techniques to obtain them. Knowledge, roughly translated, means the happiness of the true self-understanding. Each individual should seek to comprehend his or her true self. In turn, this brings a sense of well-being, joy, and harmony as one comes in contact with one's "own nature." The Knowledge includes four secret meditation procedures and the process of reaching the true self within can only be achieved by the individual, but with the guidance and help of a teacher. Hence, the movement seems to embrace aspects of world-rejection and world-affirmation. The tens of thousands of followers in the West do not see themselves as members of a religion, but the adherents of a system of teachings that extol the goal of enjoying life to the full. They claim that Rawat's authority comes from the nature of his teachings and their benefit to the individual.

In Sacred Journeys sociologist James V. Downton writes

Aside from all the psychological and social explanations one could offer to explain their conversions, the fact is that, during the Knowledge session or afterward in meditation, these young people had a spiritual experience which deeply affected them and changed the course of their lives. It was an experience which moved many to tears and joy, for they had found the answer they had been seeking. It was an experience which gave their lives more positive direction, meaning, and purpose. It was an experience which brought them into a new relationship to life and removed many blocks to growth. It was an experience-which sages have spoken about throughout history-of the oneness of life.

Marc Galanter (MD), professor of Psychiatry and Director of the Division of Alcoholism and Drug Abuse at the New York University Medical Center, writes that "over the long term of membership, meditation also played an important role in supporting a convert's continuing involvement. An analysis of the relationship between the time members spent in meditation and the decline in their level of neurotic distress revealed that greater meditation time was associated with diminished neurotic distress. This association suggests that the emotional response to meditation acts as a reinforcement for its continued practice." That is, the more a member meditated, in general, the better the person was likely to feel. Members apparently used meditation to relieve distress, both at scheduled times and on an ad hoc basis.

Paul Schnabel a sociologist, references Van der Lans, a religious psychologist employed at the Catholic University of Nijmegen. Van der Lans says that among his Western students, Rawat appeared to stimulate an uncritical attitude, giving them an opportunity to project their fantasies of divinity onto his person. According to these authors, the divine nature of the guru is a standard element of Eastern religion, but removed from its cultural context, and confounded with the Western understanding of God as a father, what is lost is the difference between the guru's person and that which the guru symbolizes—resulting in what they refer to as limitless personality worship. Schnabel writes that this kind of understanding of the master-disciple relationship, alien to the original Eastern guru-disciple context, often ends in disillusionment for the disciple, who finds that the teacher in the end fails to live up to his or her expectations.

=== Former followers ===
Reports obtained by Ted Patrick and several scholars after deprogramming of several of Rawat's former worshippers refer to the experience of Rawat's "meditation" techniques as self-hypnosis, and as diminishing the ability to think both during the practice and for an extended period of time after cessation.

=== Others ===
Rawat has been criticized for a lack of intellectual content in his public discourses According to David V. Barrett, at the heart of Prem Rawat's teaching is the Knowledge, and the experience is an individual, subjective experience rather than a body of dogma. In its Divine Light days the movement was sometimes criticized for this stressing of emotional experience over intellect. The teaching could perhaps best be described as practical mysticism.
