= Cagan =

Cagan may refer to:

- Andrea Cagan — American writer.
- Phillip D. Cagan, American economist.
- Khagan, Mongolian title of imperial rank.
