= Another Gospel =

1989 book by Ruth A. Tucker

- Book cover, 2004 ed.
- Author: Ruth A. Tucker
- Language: English
- Subject: New religious movements, New Age
- Genre: Non-fiction
- Publisher: Zondervan
- Publication date: 1989
- Publication place: United States
- Pages: 464
- ISBN: 0-310-25937-1
- OCLC: 19354219
- LC Class: 89005628

Another Gospel: Cults, Alternative Religions, and the New Age Movement is a non-fiction book discussing new religious movements and the New Age movement, written by Ruth A. Tucker. The book was published in 1989 by Zondervan, a Christian publishing house. Another edition was released by the same publisher in 2004.

== Author ==
Ruth A. Tucker is a former professor of missiology with a PhD from Northern Illinois University. Tucker has taught alternative religions at both the graduate and undergraduate levels. Her book Daughters of the Church was published in 1987. In 2000, Tucker was a professor at Calvin Theological Seminary. Tucker authored the book Walking Away from Faith in 2002.

== Title ==
The title "Another Gospel" is taken from Paul's Epistle to the Galatians in the New Testament verses 1:6-8: "I marvel that ye are so soon removed from him that called you into the grace of Christ unto another gospel: Which is not another; but there be some that trouble you, and would pervert the gospel of Christ. But though we, or an angel from heaven, preach any other gospel unto you than that which we have preached unto you, let him be accursed."

== Contents ==
Another Gospel discusses a wide range of groups, including Latter-day Saints, Seventh-day Adventism, Jehovah's Witnesses, Christian Science, New Thought and Unity, the Worldwide Church of God, the Way International, the Children of God, the Unification Church, Hare Krishnas, Baháʼís, and Scientology. Other groups, including Rosicrucianism and Swedenborgianism, are described in the appendices. Tucker discusses some of the controversies related to these groups while adding that new religions frequently maintain an "ability to reach out and meet the needs of people who are suffering and dejected."

Tucker writes about the New Age movement, "The most popular and widely publicized new religion in recent years has been the New Age movement, a difficult-to-define variety of mystical, spiritualistic, and occultic groups that above all else are not new. From channeling crystals to harmonic convergence, celebrities and ordinary citizens have been captivated by this increasingly popular religious trend." Tucker asks: "Is New Age merely an age-old form of the occult that will taper off in popularity as the fad loses its luster, or is it truly a movement that has only barely begun to make its all-encompassing mark on the world?" and warns that "every individual concerned about maintaining traditional Christian values should be apprehensive about the potential negative effect the New Age may have on the coming generations."

In the discussion of the Unification Church, Tucker writes that the organization has employed controversial recruitment tactics, which subsequently led to college students dropping out of universities to join it. "The recruitment strategy of the Unification Church was widely criticized for utilizing tactics that sometimes were compared to brainwashing techniques," writes Tucker. Another Gospel describes how Unification Church founder Sun Myung Moon stated that he was told by Jesus Christ to complete a task which Jesus had not succeeded in, and to carry out God's desires on earth.

Tucker notes a disparity between approaches to religious movements abroad compared to within a person's cultural milieu. "In cross-cultural evangelism overseas, missionaries are admonished not to ridicule other religious beliefs or practices... Yet, these 'cross-cultural' courtesies are often blatantly ignored when they pertain to situations within our own culture. We often ridicule or mock the unorthodox religious beliefs of people in our communities, because cultists do not deserve respect," writes Tucker.

Another Gospel delves into the difficulty of defining cults. Tucker says that a cult is "a religious group that has a 'prophet'-founder called of God to give a special message not found in the Bible itself." She comments on the defining characteristics utilized by sociologists, who "have tended to define cults more in terms of lifestyle, proselytizing practices, and authoritarian leadership, rather than in terms of belief or by any standard of orthodoxy". According to Tucker, cults often have a "prophet-founder" who serves as a "legalistic, authoritarian leader". In her given definition of a cult, Tucker writes, "In deference to this charismatic leader... the style of leadership is authoritarian and there is frequently an exclusivistic outlook supported by a legalistic lifestyle and persecution mentality... It is the attribute of a prophet-founder that very distinctly separates cults from denominations."

According to the description of the book from the publisher, Tucker "explains how... alternative religious movements appear to meet people's needs." Tucker concludes that "the increase in cult membership is a direct result of a failure on the part of the church."

== Reception ==
Charles H. Lippy, writing in Modern American Popular Religion: A Critical Assessment and Annotated Bibliography, stated that Another Gospel is written "from a decidedly conservative Christian perspective", and although Tucker "does not ridicule the groups she seeks to expose... it is clear that [she] does not see the groups she studies as legitimate religious alternatives."

Robert M. Bowman, Jr., reviewing Another Gospel for the Christian Research Journal, commented: "Although Tucker is at her best in recounting the histories of the religions she surveys, at places she is not critical enough of the historical accounts that the cults themselves have published." Bowman's review concluded that "Ruth Tucker's Another Gospel is, in several respects, the best general textbook on the cults. It is more up-to-date, more readable, and more respectful of the cults than any other such textbook. But, because it is lacking in biblical critiques of the cults (which is understandable, given the author's areas of expertise), it cannot replace those books which do provide such critiques, however much fresh treatments are needed."

Gordon R. Lewis, a professor of philosophy and theology at Denver Conservative Baptist Theological Seminary, wrote for the International Bulletin of Missionary Research that the book "achieves a high degree of historical objectivity", but criticizes it for lacking "more epistemological, theological, and ethical thought about what is essential to authentic Christianity" as opposed to the alternative forms of Christianity studied in the work.

A review of the book for the Journal of Christian Nursing stated that the book provides information about "what people in various cults and religious groups believe" and called it "outstanding," recommending it for both personal libraries and church libraries. The reviewer commented: "Although designed as a reference book, it is hard to put down. I started dipping into sections that interested me, then sat down and read the whole book. In the process, I felt as if I'd taken a semester course in alternative religions."

Author M. James Penton wrote positively of the book in his book Apocalypse Delayed, published by the University of Toronto Press. He wrote that Tucker's chapter on Jehovah's Witnesses "is far superior to most older books and articles produced by Catholic and Protestant critics of the Watch Tower movement."

In a discussion of the prevalence of belief in reincarnation among adherents of various belief systems, Theology for the Community of God author Stanley J. Grenz recommended Tucker's book "for references to the presence of this doctrine in the New Age movement".

== See also ==
- Christian countercult movement
- New religious movements
