= Jean-François Mayer =

Swiss religious historian (born 1957)

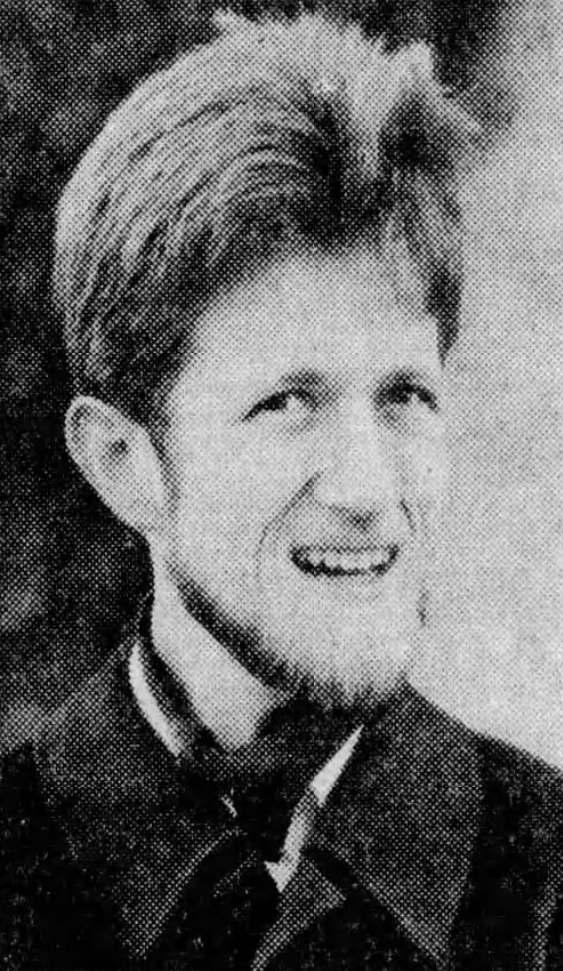
- Mayer, pictured 1985
- Born: 25 April 1957 (age 69); Fribourg, Switzerland
- Occupations: Historian, author, translator

Academic background
- Education: Jean Moulin University Lyon 3 (MA, PhD)

Academic work
- Discipline: Religious historian
- Sub-discipline: Academic study of new religious movements
- Institutions: University of Fribourg
- Notable works: Les Mythes du Temple Solaire
- Website: mayer.info

Jean-François Mayer (born 25 April 1957) is a Swiss religious historian, author, and translator. He is also Director of the Religioscope Institute, which he founded. His writing focuses on religion, with a particular focus on new religious movements and cults, including the Unification Church, the Church of Scientology and the Pilgrims of Arès.

He received his master's degree, and then his doctorate, from the Jean Moulin University Lyon 3 in 1979 and 1984. Following a brief career in radio, he undertook an analysis of new religions in Switzerland for the Swiss National Science Foundation, funded by a grant; the results of this work were published in a 1993 book, Les nouvelles voies spirituelles. In the 1990s, he was an analyst for the Swiss federal government on international affairs and policy. Following this, he became a lecturer and research associate at the University of Fribourg, and founded the Religioscope Institute and website, which supplies information on religion.

Mayer is most well known for his work covering the Order of the Solar Temple, a group notorious for committing several acts of mass murder-suicide in the 1990s, which resulted in a media frenzy. Having been the only person to study the group prior to their deaths, he was personally consulted by the Swiss police in their investigation of the organization, and was appointed as an expert in the case.

== Early life ==
Jean-Francois Mayer was born 25 April 1957 in Fribourg, Switzerland, to a Catholic family. He has a sister. At the age of 16, he was a member of the Opus Dei, then popular among students in Fribourg; soon after, he became involved in the Latin Catholic Church, various other "dead traditions", Quakers, as well as several other churches, then converted to the Orthodox Catholic Church, receiving an Orthodox baptism. He later became interested in Lutheranism, then returned to Orthodoxy. Describing his life, the Swiss magazine L'Hebdo said he seemed to have been wandering "in a frantic search for spiritual roots". He later credited his interest in cults as stemming from his teenage interest in a book on the topic, L'Offensive des Sectes.

=== Far-right activism ===
In his youth, he was active in far-right politics in Switzerland. As a teenager, he organized an anniversary party of the Hungarian Uprising, inviting several far-right movements. According to French journalist Serge Faubert, at this time, he locally distributed the neo-fascist magazine Défense de l'Occident. In a book in 1992, writer René Monzat accused him of having then been the distributor of another similar publication, Horizons européens. Another book the same year accused him of having been a member of the Nouvel ordre social, a movement in Geneva. In this period, according to Damir Skenderovic, he was the operator of an Odinist Lyon-based publication called Skuld.

According to the Swiss newspaper La Liberté, Mayer abandoned any political affiliation after returning to Switzerland, and former friends who were members of the Nouvel ordre social stated they no longer had contact with him. Faubert however claimed had written a book review for a publication of GRECE in 1986, which is right-wing. When asked about this in 1994, he admitted he was far-right in his youth, and stated: "I wouldn't say, as some do, that it was a youthful error. That would be a lack of courage and dignity, it seems to me. There are things I wouldn't do again, that's for sure, but it was an experience, among others." He stated in an interview with L'Hebdo in 1993 that while he did not regret his past experiences, his "approach has changed quite a bit" and he no longer subscribed to any political ideology, and that as to the magazines he had published in, "I'm a free man, I write what I want where I want [...] I don't have to answer to anyone."

== Education and career ==
Mayer received his master's degree from the Jean Moulin University Lyon 3 in 1979, and his doctorate degree in history at the same institution in 1984. His doctoral thesis was written on Emanuel Swedenborg. In 1986, he launched the environmentalist Parti écologique fribourgeois (transl. Fribourg Ecologist Party, PEF), which he was the president of for two years. He was on the party's submitted list of five electoral candidates in the 1987 Swiss federal election; at that time he was also vice president of the Association des non-fumeurs (transl. Association of Non-Smokers). For some years he contributed to Swiss newspapers. According to Mayer, he began to focus more on cults following a lecture he gave on the subject in 1982. Mayer was the Swiss correspondent of the journal Politica Hermetica, established in 1987, which focused on the relationship between esotericism and politics. Mayer worked with the Swiss Radio International for a brief time, and was a researcher in the Swiss National Science Foundation (SNSF).

Mayer was a scientific associate of the Bureau d'aide et d'information sur les mouvements religieux (BAIMR), a French-speaking anti-cult organization in Switzerland, founded in 1989. BAIMR distributed Mayer's "instruction manual" for dealing with cults in 1991, Les Sectes et vous, which warns those "in search of spirituality" against cults, but also advises families of cult members on how to deal with the situation, recommending against deprogramming practices. During the 1980s he operated the Fribourg-based publisher Les Trois Nornes. In the mid 1980s, while researching the Unification Church, his travel expenses to study the group were paid by the group itself. He was previously secretary of the International Committee of CESNUR, from which he resigned in 1991.

He was, as of 1997, the only full time Swiss cult researcher, and further one of only a few Francophone ones. He was referred to by several Swiss newspapers as the country's "Mr. Cults". For three years from the late 1980s to the early 1990s, he took part in a program of new religious movement research operated by the SNSF, funded by a national grant of nearly 200,000 Swiss francs. He researched many groups, developing "a network of informers" and contacts with other specialists. As a result of this program, he wrote the book Les nouvelles voies spirituelles, described by 24 heures as a "veritable bible" for those wishing to look into cults. This program was completed in 1990: he had expected there to be a follow up to it, however it was not continued and he was then unemployed.

Following this, he could no longer afford to research; he then accepted a position at the Swiss Ministry of Defence. From 1991 to 1998, he worked as an analyst there on international affairs and policy. He was one of 25 civil servants in that position, who came from various specialties; workers at this job have access to state secrets. He was the secretary of the Central Office of Defense's (OCD) Conférence de situation, which brought together several heads of Swiss intelligence agencies and which provided the Federal Council of Switzerland with updates on the strategic situation. In 1995 he wrote a report published by the OCD focusing on the impact of religious aspects on security policy, which he called "theopolitics" and "theostrategy".

He wrote the Swiss report on the Church of Scientology. In the early 1990s, the Church of Scientology's Office of Special Affairs listed Mayer as someone who could be a "potential supporter" of the organization, along with other religious specialists like Émile Poulat. Mayer, responding to his inclusion in the list, said that he was not a sympathizer, and that while he favored neutrality from an academic perspective, in more personally involved articles he was more critical. Interviewed about the Church of Scientology in 1996, he said he disagreed with their worldview but disagreed with the group being banned. He argued that banning the organization would make its members see themselves as martyrs, and argued there was no legal basis for defining a cult; he said that while he believed that Scientology's worldview was wrong, it had a limited ability to impose its ideology on others and therefore posed a limited risk to democracy. He criticized the group for treating its critics as criminals; he said that to avoid cult-related tragedies outside pressure and an internal "critical spirit" was often helpful, but that while Scientologists could admit they made mistakes, "these mistakes are repeated, regularly".

French journalist Serge Faubert, in his 1993 book Une secte au cœur de la République, an investigation of Scientology, discussed Mayer's far-right past. Faubert said he did not expect Mayer to lead "a crusade against gurus", but criticized his tone and was concerned by his past in the far right. Following Mayer's appointment as an expert to the OTS case, he expressed his surprise. This accusation was brought up by L'Hebdo the same year, which was surprised at his very high position in the government given his past political views. At the same time, La Liberté doubted he was still far-right, saying that not even "the best magnifying glass" could detect any right-wing political sympathies in the many articles he had written, and that he had not been associated with the far right in several years.

=== Solar Temple ===
Mayer became much more well known following his investigation into the Order of the Solar Temple, a group notorious for committing several mass murder-suicides; the case resulted in a media frenzy. He was personally involved in the investigation and was consulted by the Swiss police, after he was mailed the group's suicide note by its leaders. He was the only civilian involved in the investigation, as well as the only academic to have had prior personal interactions with the group, and was cited as an expert by the judge investigating the case. Mayer had studied the organization prior as part of his grant funded study into new religions in Switzerland, and published the only academic writing on the OTS before the violence occurred, Templars for the Age of Aquarius: The Archedia Clubs (1984–1991) and the International Chivalric Order of the Solar Tradition, published in the French newsletter Mouvements Religieux in January 1993. Mayer had personally attended OTS meetings as far back as 1987, meeting leader Luc Jouret. Prior to the organization's demise he had collected about 100 manuscript pages of content on them.

As part of his investigation, he had attended one Jouret's conferences. There were about 500 or 700 people at the conference he first attended, which he found surprising. After the lecture, pamphlets were distributed and attendees were told that if they wished to know more they could file an application, where they were then invited to another lecture to learn more about the group. At this lecture, less than 10 people expressed interest and by several months later only one person out of the group had joined the OTS. Mayer asked Jouret for a personal interview; he agreed, and they met for lunch at a hotel. At the time, Mayer noted having what he viewed as a surprisingly positive opinion of Jouret following this meeting, and viewed him as having sincere character and belief, someone who was very certain they had a mission in life.

During the conversation, Jouret revealed several personal details to Mayer, discussing with him his separation from his wife and the death of his child. During a meeting at a restaurant December 1987, which lasted for about three hours, Mayer mentioned an anti-cult publication that briefly discussed Jouret – not the Solar Temple, but in the context of a prior group he was a member of – to which Jouret expressed his dislike. Jouret then told Mayer that he had called the person who wrote the publication, asking for a correction, and told him that when this person refused, the author had turned up dead a week later. Mayer interpreted this as an indication that Jouret could not easily handle opposition, and that this was also possibly a warning to him personally as he was then the only person looking into the group. According to Mayer, this did not work, as according to him, "usually if people warn me this way it makes me only more curious".

Following the story breaking, he received many calls from journalists and requests for interviews, until he was requisitioned by a judge for the investigation. Following this he was advised not to speak to the media. While the investigation was ongoing, his far-right past attracted media controversy and criticism; he was particularly criticized by Blick and 24 Heures, while the newspaper Le Nouveau Quotidien fiercely defended him. Blick falsely accused Mayer of having been summoned to court due to a personal connection to the group, which was repeated by the ATS: this was incorrect, and he had actually been invited to assist with the investigation as an expert. During the investigation he was temporarily let go from the defense ministry on the grounds of force majeure.

He said that the Swiss state could not have monitored the Solar Temple as it was barely known prior to the tragedies, saying there were difficulties in deciding what groups should or should not be monitored. He criticized those who fell for conspiracy theories and lies by the leaders of the OTS, as well as members of related religious movements who did not reflect on their beliefs after the deaths. In his view the deaths were motivated by the paranoid personality of the leader and his desire for media speculation and attention. In his view, the media, by feeding conspiracies and narratives that the group had promoted, only fell into their "trap" and became the "executor's of Di Mambro's will". Mayer was described by fellow scholar of religion George D. Chryssides as "probably the world's leading authority on the Solar Temple". Mike Kropveld of the cult watching organization Info-Secte, writing for Cultic Studies Review, said Mayer was "considered to be the foremost expert on the Solar Temple".

== Later career ==
He left the OCD in 1998. Following this, he resumed his studies of NRMs and taught at the University of Fribourg from 1999 to 2007, where he was a lecturer and research associate in their comparative science of religions unit. In 1999, he founded a firm of strategic research consultancy called the JFM Recherches et Analyses.

He is also known for his research into the Movement for the Restoration of the Ten Commandments of God, a Ugandan new religious movement notorious for committing mass murder-suicide in the year 2000. He personally traveled to Uganda twice to investigate the group following the deaths, one of only a few western researchers to do so. He wrote a chapter in James R. Lewis's anthology Violence and New Religious Movements discussing the group; Mayer's chapter was described by one reviewers as a "welcome addition" to what limited scholarship on the group there was. Another reviewer praised what he viewed as "good scholarship" on the part of Mayer in weighing the different arguments as to what occurred with the group, though he said this did not lead Mayer to "any firm conclusion".

In 2007, Mayer founded the Religioscope Institute and became the director; this organization aims to study religion's influence on the modern world, as well as to disseminate information on the topic, with a "Media and Religion" project focusing on informing the press. Religioscope is not particularly focused on cults/NRMs, instead religion more broadly. He is also the writer of the Religioscope website, a separate bilingual project run by Mayer, started in 2002. In an encyclopedia entry from 2004, Daren Kemp described the site as being then the "foremost Internet source in French for scholarly information on religion, including NRMs." He is associate editor of the periodical Religion Watch, published out of New York, which focuses on religious trends. In 2012, he was appointed by the Canton of Fribourg to prepare a report on the situation of religious communities there.

== Works ==
Mayer's writing focuses on religion and new religious movements, including Islam, the Unification Church, the Church of Scientology. He was an early researcher of the Pilgrims of Arès. He has also published works about the link between religion and aliens, the apocalypse, and the Internet. Mayer has described his own approach as arising from "a mixture of sympathy and critical distance". Mayer has argued that the increased freedom of speech and criticism that the Internet allows for creates pressure on religious movements for transparency and accountability, particularly with Scientology. He has been critical of theories of brainwashing. L'Hebdo described his works as, being on highly controversial topics, notable for their restraint and uncritical tone.

Mayer is the author of several books on new religious movements. In 1987 he published Les sectes, which discusses cults and their position in society. Three years later he authored Confessions d'un chasseur de sectes, which covers his opinions on his line of work and personal background, as well as how it related to his own religious beliefs. The book received positive reviews. In 1996, Mayer published a book on his research into the Solar Temple in 1996, Les Mythes du Temple Solaire, praised by reviewers as the "most significant work" on the group. In 2002 he authored Les Fondamentalismes, a book about religious fundamentalism. Alongside Reender Kranenborg, he was editor of La naissance des nouvelles religions.

== Publications ==
- —— (1984). La Nouvelle Eglise de Lausanne et le mouvement swedenborgien en Suisse romande, des origines à 1948 (in French). Swedenborg Verlag. ISBN 3-85927-402-3.
- —— (1985). Sectes nouvelles: un regard neuf (in French). Éditions du Cerf. ISBN 2-204-02458-9.
- —— (1985). Une honteuse exploitation des esprits et des porte‑monnaie? Les polémiques contre l'Armée du Salut en Suisse en 1883 et leurs étranges similitudes avec les arguments utilisés aujourd'hui contre les "nouvelles sectes" (in French). Fribourg: Les Trois Nornes. ISBN 2-88210-000-0.
- —— (1986). Les Mormons et la Polygamie: Trois textes mormons du XIXe siècle en langue française, précédés d'une introduction à l'histoire et la pratique du mariage plural chez les saints des derniers jours, (in French). Fribourg: Les Trois Nornes. ISBN 2-88210-002-7.
- —— (1987). Les sectes: Non-conformismes chrétiens et nouvelles religions (in French). Éditions du Cerf. ISBN 2-204-02811-8.
- —— (1989). L'Évêque Bugnion ou les Voyages extraordinaires d'un aventurier ecclésiastique vaudois (in French). Éditions 24 heures. ISBN 2-8265-1063-0.
- —— (1989). Les Sectes et vous: Petit manuel d'information pratique (in French). Paris / Fribourg: Editions Saint-Paul. ISBN 2-85049-444-5.
- Introvigne, Massimo; ——; Zucchini, Ernesto (1990). I nuovi movimenti religiosi: Sette cristiane e nuovi culti (in Italian). Leumann: Editrice Elle Di Ci. ISBN 88-0114-260-9.
- —— (1990). Confessions d'un chasseur de sectes (in French). Éditions du Cerf. ISBN 2-204-04060-6.
- —— (1993). Les nouvelles voies spirituelles: Enquête sur la religiosité parallèle en Suisse (in French). Lausanne: Éditions L'Âge d'Homme. ISBN 2-8251-0412-4.
- —— (1995). Mit Sekten konfrontiert (in German). Translated by Lauble, Michael. Freiburg: Paulus Verlag. ISBN 3-7228-0362-4.
- —— (1996). Les Mythes du Temple Solaire (in French). Georg. ISBN 2-8257-0554-3.
- —— (2001). Les Fondamentalismes (in French). Georg. ISBN 2-8257-0767-8.
- ——; Kranenborg, Reender, eds. (2004). La naissance des nouvelles religions (in French). Georg. ISBN 2-8257-0877-1.
- —— (2008). Internet et religion (in French). Infolio. ISBN 978-2-88474-096-8.
- Hämmerli, Maria; ——, eds. (2014). Orthodox Identities in Western Europe: Migration, Settlement and Innovation. Ashgate Publishing. ISBN 978-1-4094-6754-0.
- —— (2016). L'évolution des chrétiens évangéliques et leur perception en Suisse romande (in French). Réseau Évangélique Suisse. ISBN 978-2-8260-1002-9.
