= Mikael Rothstein =

Danish historian of religions (born 1961)

- Born: 8 May 1961 (age 65)
- Occupation: Associate professor
- Relatives: Klaus Rothstein

Academic background
- Education: University of Copenhagen

Academic work
- Discipline: Historian
- Sub-discipline: Religious studies
- Institutions: University of Copenhagen

Mikael Rothstein (born 8 May 1961) is an associate professor of religious history at the University of Copenhagen in Copenhagen, Denmark. He has authored several books on the topic of religion and new religious movements.

== Early life and education ==
Rothstein was born 8 May 1961 in Denmark. He earned his PhD in 1993 and became a Lector at the University of Copenhagen in 2001. He has been on the board of the Danish Association for the History of Religions (DAHR) and the editorial boards of the publications Renner Studies on New Religions (Aarhus University Press) and Nye Religioner (Gyldendal).

== Career ==
Rothstein has been called one of Denmark's top researchers in new religious movements, and has been credited with making them a topic of scholarship. Another area of scholarly interest is indigenous religions; he was the first researcher to describe the Penan people of Borneo.

Rothstein has been involved in some conflicts in the media. In 2007 he was criticized after defending Ungdomshuset. In 2011 he was one of those criticizing the rephrasing of the mission of Denmark's state-owned broadcasting service, DR, to include promoting Christian values, which he called "a way of making us all hostages to a nationalist Christian project". He has called Lars Hedegaard "an assailant" (Danish: en voldsmand), leading to criticism from other free speech advocates. He has been described in a Christian periodical as "uncompromising [and] a wonderful, intelligent man who is both warm, caring and generous with praise for both colleagues and students" and by another commentator in the same publication as demonstrating "one-sided bile" and "hatred" in his utterances concerning Christianity. An opinion article in another newspaper likewise portrayed him as a hater of religion.

== Works ==
Among books he has written or co-edited are: Belief Transformations: Some Aspects of the Relation between Science and Religion in Transcendental Meditation (TM) and the International Society for Krishna Consciousness (ISKCON) (1996), Secular Theories on Religion: Current Perspectives (2000) (co-author with Tim Jensen), New Age Religion and Globalization (2002), New Religions in a Postmodern World (2003) (co-editor with Reender Kranenborg) and The Cambridge Companion to New Religious Movements (2012) (co-editor with Olav Hammer).

== Personal life ==
Rothstein and his wife, Mie, have two children. His brother, Klaus Rothstein, is a well known TV journalist.

== Bibliography ==
- Belief Transformations: Some Aspects of the Relation between Science and Religion in Transcendental Meditation (TM) and the International Society for Krishna Consciousness (ISKCON) (1996)
- Secular Theories on Religion: Current Perspectives (2000) (co-author with Tim Jensen)
- New Age Religion and Globalization (2002),
- New Religions in a Postmodern World (2003) (co-editor with Reender Kranenborg)
- The Cambridge Companion to New Religious Movements (2012) (co-editor with Olav Hammer)
