= Les Mythes du Temple Solaire =

1996 book by Jean-François Mayer

- Cover of the first edition
- Author: Jean-François Mayer
- Language: French
- Subject: Order of the Solar Temple
- Publisher: Georg éditeur
- Publication date: 1996
- Publication place: Switzerland
- Pages: 126
- ISBN: 2-8257-0554-3
- OCLC: 235958062

Les Mythes du Temple Solaire is a book by religious historian Jean-François Mayer. It was published in 1996 by Georg éditeur. The book covers the Order of the Solar Temple (French: Ordre du Temple solaire, OTS) a group notorious for the deaths of many of its members through both murder and suicide in several incidents throughout the 1990s. Mayer had access to many of the OTS's records while writing the book, and had been personally consulted in the police investigation.

The book analyses the beliefs of the group, as well as the psychology of its leader, and what led to the deaths. It includes many of the OTS's own documents, which make up half the book. It was later translated in two expanded editions into Italian and German, and an abbreviated English version was published as a journal article in Nova Religio. The book received positive reviews, with praise for its analysis and the attitude of the author towards its subject matter; it was described as influential on later studies of the OTS.

== Background ==
The Order of the Solar Temple was a millennialist new religious movement, led by Luc Jouret and Joseph Di Mambro. They were active in several French speaking countries, until in 1994 several mass suicides and murders were orchestrated by members of the group. This followed many internal stressors in the organization, including legal issues and money problems.

Jean-François Mayer is a Swiss religious historian. Mayer had studied the organization prior and had personally attended OTS meetings as far back as 1987, meeting Jouret. He published the only academic writing on the OTS before the violence occurred, Templars for the Age of Aquarius: The Archedia Clubs (1984–1991) and the International Chivalric Order of the Solar Tradition, published in the French newsletter Mouvements Religieux in January 1993.

Mayer personally participated in the investigation of the OTS, being consulted by the Swiss police. Due to his participation in the judicidal inquiry on the case, in writing the book he had access to many of the records of the group that they had left behind, including documents, computer records, and cassettes seized from their properties.

== Contents ==
In the book, Mayer regularly quotes the OTS's own writings; half the book in total is either the direct documents of the group or related works. He argues that to abstract from the group's own beliefs by not analyzing their writings directly would "condemn us to understanding nothing and ignoring the fact that there are ideas that kill."

Mayer analyzes the leader Joseph Di Mambro and his psychology, describing him as paranoid and as a pathological liar. He argues that contrary to the group's assertions, they did not experience persecution, and that the group's actions had come from Di Mambro's increasing sensitivity to criticism, strengthened by the legal issues Jouret had faced in Canada. Mayer was impressed by the actions of the Swiss police he interacted with in the investigation, and argues in the book that their "rigorous approach to the truth could teach lessons to more than one university researcher or journalist".

Mayer notes that the group prepared to leave a "myth" behind it, through elaborate planning, to make a statement. They had planned to commit the mass suicides earlier, but delayed it due to the Waco siege, as they feared that it would not make enough of a statement so soon after a similar occurrence. He states that more mass suicides were possible as many former members were still attached to the group's doctrine, though that the group no longer existed in an organized way, and that some elements of what led to the group's actions were still unknown. He concludes that there are "ideas that kill" and denounces what he views as the detached-from-reality beliefs of many esoteric movements.

== Publication ==
The book was published in 1996 by Georg éditeur. In 1997, a revised Italian version, Il Tempio Solare, was published by Editrice Elle Di Ci, and the next year an expanded German edition was released as Der Sonnentempel: Die Tragödie einer Sekte and published by Paulusverlag. In 1999 an abbreviated version of the book was published in the journal Nova Religio as ""Our Terrestrial Journey is Coming to an End": The Last Voyage of the Solar Temple", translated into English by Elijah Siegler. This was included as a chapter in James R. Lewis's 2004 The Encyclopedic Sourcebook of New Age Religions.

== Reception ==
Les Mythes du Temple Solaire received positive reviews. Le Monde's Philippe Broussard described the book as the "first real reference work on the subject", and, while noting its short length, labeled it a "must-read." A review in Radicalisation Research praised it as "the most significant work on the collective suicide and killings of The Order of the Solar Temple". The review noted its influence on later works about the OTS, and said that though Mayer had published other works on the group the book remained his "core research" on them.

The book was favorably reviewed by sociologist Françoise Champion, writing for the journal Archives de sciences sociales des religions. Champion called the book a "valuable work" and praised Mayer's understanding of the people involved. She described Mayer's attitude as benefiting the book, concerned both with his social responsibility as a researcher and with understanding the people and ideas of the group.

A response to the shortened journal article, "Our Terrestrial Journey is Coming to an End", by Jean E. Rosenfeld writing for Nova Religio, praised Mayer's scholarship as "admirably restrained", and concurred with Mayer on applying Colin Campbell's "cultic mileau" concept to the OTS. Rosenfeld noted Mayer's experience in the case as "both fortuitous and exceptional" given his access to primary records, comparing this to similar cases, such as Jonestown, scholarly discussion of which are often held back by unreleased government records.
