= Pilgrims of Arès =

New religious movement founded in 1974 whose founder was Michel Potay

- Region: France
- Founder: Michel Potay
- Origin: 1974; France and other countries
- Members: 2,500 – 5,000
- Official website: www.adira.net

The Pilgrims of Arès is a new religious movement founded in 1974 by Michel Potay. It was named after the town of Arès, Gironde, where Michel Potay allegedly received revelations. Beliefs and practices are based on the Revelation of Arès, written by Potay.

== Structure and practices ==
=== Members and geographical area ===
The Pilgrims of Arès are organized in a decentralized manner. According to a critic of the group, the movement has about "500 to 2,000 followers". According to another critic of the movement, the Pilgrims of Arès live sometimes isolated, sometimes in groups or missions. Legally, they form regional assemblies as the "Workers of the Harvest" ("Les Ouvriers de la Moisson"), "The Eye Opens" ("L'Œil s'Ouvre," created in Bordeaux on 4 March 1987, dissolved in 2001), "The Brothers of the Dawn" ("Frères de l'Aube"), "The Torrents" (created in Paris in 1989), or larger associations, such as "The Work of the Pilgrimage of Arès." Also according to the same association, the Pilgrims of Arès would develop missions in Germany, Belgium (Liège), France, United Kingdom, Hungary, Ireland, Poland, Russia and Switzerland (Geneva, Neuchâtel, Zurich). The movement begins to expand outside Europe, with members in Africa, Australia, New Zealand and America (U.S. and Canada).

=== Organization and meetings ===
The believer has a spiritual and individual freedom. The Pilgrims may be defined as any person who accepts the word of the Revelation of Arès. Two essential elements provide yet cohesive movement, otherwise very disparate and that reject any idea of centralized organization: The Revelation of Arès and their prophet, Michel Potay. Publishing and disseminating the message of this book is one of the main purposes of the movement. The House of Revelation, in Arès, publishes The Revelation of Arès, and provides bookstores and libraries. Periodicals The Pilgrim of Arès, Brothers of the Dawn (Frères de l'Aube), The Egala'h, The Bul'fda and pamphlets are also published. The associative structure then responds to these needs.

As a prophet who claims that God spoke to him directly, Potay is the founder of the movement, and is the coordinator between the various associations. Sociologist Jean-François Mayer thinks there is a tendency in sanctifying Michel Potay, but after having invested heavily in conferences and meetings, he is more discreet now. The continuation of the movement is mainly done by believers themselves. Potay died on 9 March 2025.

The Pilgrims of Arès believers are free but they are grouped into associations of local mission, called "Assemblies of God." Legally and for practical purposes, they are formed as voluntary associations. The first assembly was founded in Bordeaux in 1976, followed by a second in Paris in 1978. It was created sixty associations linked to the faith in France, in twenty French cities. These associations publish periodicals, pamphlets, organize conferences and meetings. However, no association represents Pilgrims of Arès in full. One of them, named The Work of the Pilgrimage of Arès, organizes the pilgrimage to the House of the Holy Word.

=== Pilgrimage ===
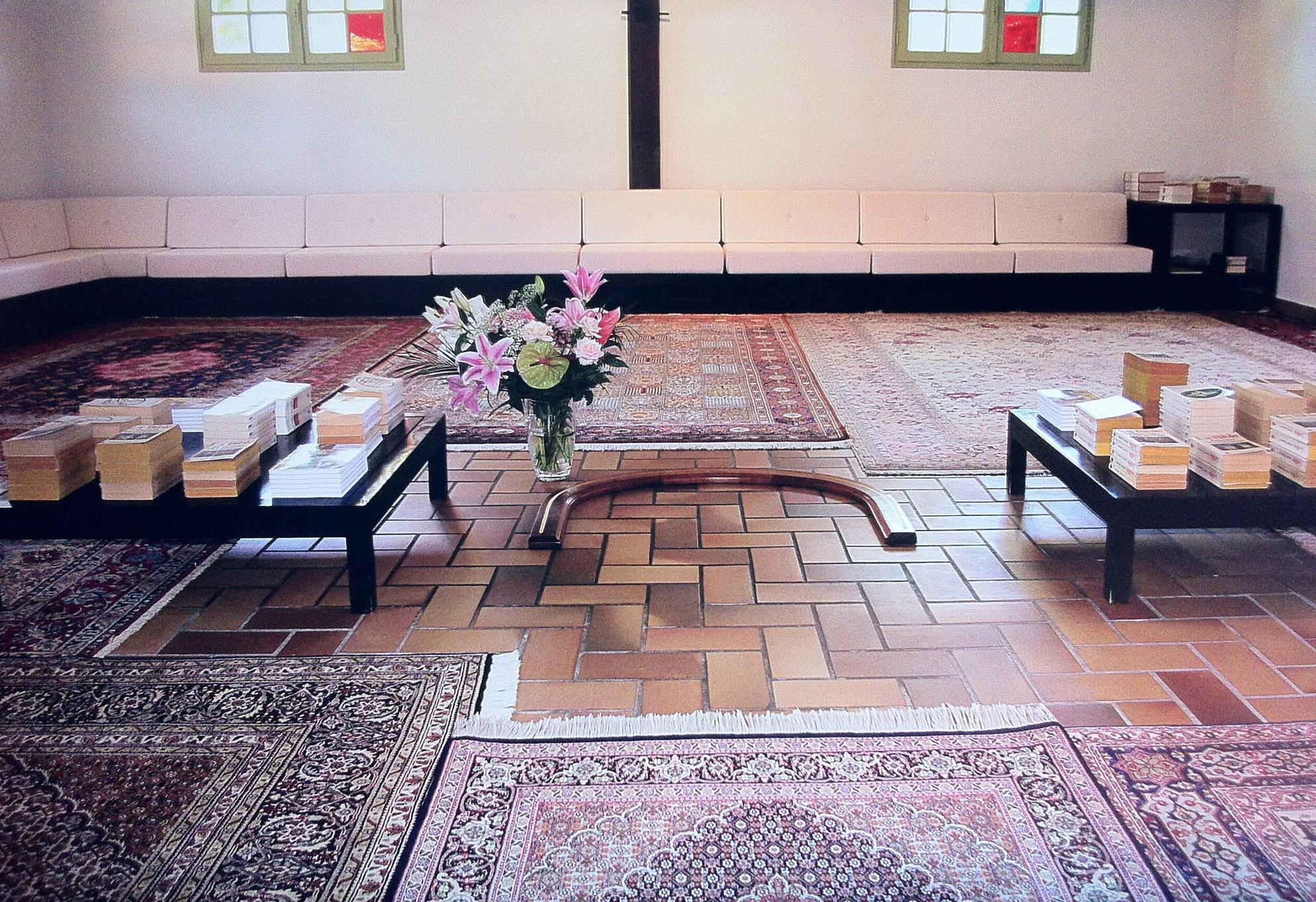
Maison de la Sainte Parole, Arès, France

A pilgrimage in Arès was founded in 1974. Followers go to the House of the Holy Word (Maison de la Sainte Parole), the place of supposed theophanies received by Potay, to pray and receive the Fire, a strengthening of his faith. The pilgrims practice "free" prayer, which is to chant softly extracts of sacred books: the Bible, the Quran and The Revelation of Arès. To access the House of the Holy Word, each pilgrim must answer three questions:

- "Do you believe that the Bible, the Quran and the Revelation of Arès are from God?"
- "Do you love all humans?"
- "Do you forgive the sins?"

However, what is important is mainly the pilgrim's motives. The pilgrim is then allowed to enter the House of the Holy Word, but he must remove his shoes and wear a white tunic. He then puts his hand down the front, and prostrates himself to kiss the ground.

The House of Revelation (Maison de la Révélation) is the place where Jesus allegedly appeared in 1974. During the pilgrimage, seminars, public missions and film screenings are organized.

== The Revelation of Ares ==
The Revelation of Ares is made of two parts:

- The Gospel Given at Ares, which Michel Potay claims to have received from Jesus in 1974, physically present during 39 or 40 nights in Michel Potay's home at Ares;
- The Book, which Michel Potay received in 1977 from God himself, manifesting himself during five nights in another part of Michel Potay's home at Ares, now named The House of the Holy Word.

The Revelation of Ares is supposed to be the continuation of the Bible and the Quran, as expressed in chapter 2 of The Revelation of Ares. To distinguish The Gospel Given at Ares from The Book, Potay's references to chapters are given in Arabic numeral for The Gospel Given at Ares, and in Roman numerals for The Book. In both cases, Michel Potay said he wrote on paper the message he was hearing. The Gospel Given at Ares is written in classical French, but The Book is written in a non-grammatical manner using mostly French words but also words from other languages. Michel Potay claims that God put in his mind the meaning of The Book, so that he could explain it to humanity.

The Revelation of Ares' core message is to practice and develop, within oneself and with everyone: love, forgiveness, freedom, creativity and spiritual intelligence. The Revelation of Ares also puts forward a social message that both religion and politics should disappear, since religion is against freedom and does not come from God but should be replaced by spirituality, and since political leadership is against freedom, it should be replaced by competent management. Moreover, pilgrims of Arès have the spiritual and social mission to spread around them the good Word of God to free humankind

== Finances ==
The movement is financed by donations from pilgrims of Arès who pay a tithe of 5% of their income. As recommended in The Revelation of Arès (34 / 6), they pay their donations to Potay himself. However, the group says these donations are discretionary.

== Cult allegations ==
One of the group's organizations, The Eye Opens, founded in 1987 in Bordeaux, was listed as cult in the 1995 French parliamentary report established by the Parliamentary Commission on Cults in France, in the category "Cultic movements with 500 to 2,000 followers." The report considered the association as an "apocalyptic" and "healer" cult.

In 2005, a MIVILUDES report cited Pilgrims of Arès in the chapter on healing through prayer.

== See also ==
- List of Gospels
