= Cults: Faith, Healing and Coercion =

1989 book by Marc Galanter

- Book cover, Hardcover ed.
- Author: Marc Galanter (MD)
- Language: English
- Subject: Cults, Psychology
- Genre: Non-fiction
- Publisher: Oxford University Press
- Publication date: May 4, 1989
- Publication place: United States
- Media type: Hardcover
- Pages: 240
- ISBN: 978-0-19-505631-0
- Followed by: Cults and New Religious Movements: A Report of the American Psychiatric Association

Cults: Faith, Healing and Coercion is a non-fiction book on cults and coercive persuasion, written by Marc Galanter. The book was published in hardcover format in 1989 by Oxford University Press, and again in hardcover in 1999 in a second-edition work. The second edition was reprinted by Oxford University Press in March 2007.

== Author ==
Galanter works at the New York University School of Medicine, as Professor of Psychiatry and Director of the Division of Alcoholism and Drug Abuse. He is also the editor of Cults and New Religious Movements: A Report of the American Psychiatric Association. In a review in The American Journal of Psychiatry, Armando Favazza described Galanter as "the psychiatric expert on cults".

== Main points ==
The book is based on Galanter's fifteen years studying the psychology of contemporary charismatic groups. Groups discussed and examined include the Aum Shinrikyo, Hare Krishna, Peoples Temple, Unification Church, the Divine Light Mission, and Alcoholics Anonymous. In addition to these groups, the author also examines alternative medicine and spiritual recovery movements, and their similarities to charismatic groups and their leaders. Galanter analyzes recruitment tactics of the groups, indoctrination techniques, and legal aspects involved with conservatorship and deprogramming. A directory is provided for those seeking help after being involved in groups similar to those discussed in the work.

The book analyzes these groups and methodologies from a scientific viewpoint, as well as providing first-person accounts of religious conversion, and in certain cases subsequent apostasy. Galanter utilizes systems theory to illustrate how cult functions are similar to a social organism, with increasing conformity managed by the manipulation of psychological distress. The material is worded in a scholarly format, and yet is accessible to the non-academic reader as well.

== Reception ==
In his review of the book in The New York Times, Mark Silk writes that Galanter kept his "clinician's detachment" throughout the work in his assessment of the psychological health of members of charismatic groups, but also states that the book's failing is its single-minded, social-scientific approach to the subject. M. L. S. Nixon of Library Journal stated that Galanter's work was more "neutral and open" than Cults and Consequences by Rachel Andres and James R. Lane, but recommends both books. Publishers Weekly described the book as a "comprehensive analysis of cult power". Gwen Salama of School Library Journal noted that Galanter compared cult groups for psychological characteristics, without passing judgement on the individual groups analyzed.

In his review in The American Journal of Psychiatry, physician Armando Favazza heartily recommended the book to all of his colleagues, noting that it provides insights into both group dynamics and family functioning. Cults: Faith, Healing and Coercion was also reviewed in Contemporary Sociology by Benjamin Zablocki, and in the Journal for the Scientific Study of Religion by Thomas Robbins.

The book was required reading in the Cornell University sociology course, "Communes, Cults, and Charisma", as well as the University of Pennsylvania course, "Religious Violence and Cults". Galanter's characteristics of charismatic groups from Cults: Faith, Healing and Coercion are cited in the article on "Cults", in the Encyclopedia of Psychology.
