= Ruth Tucker =

American scholar and educator (born 1945)

Ruth A. Tucker
- Born: Ruth Anne Stellrecht; July 17, 1945 (age 81); Spooner, Wisconsin, U.S.
- Education: LeTourneau College; Baylor University; Northern Illinois University
- Occupations: Historian, author, educator

Ruth Anne Tucker (born July 17, 1945) is an American historian, author, and educator whose work has focused on Christian missions, women in Christianity, and evangelical history. She has taught at institutions including Calvin Theological Seminary and Trinity Evangelical Divinity School and is the author of several books including From Jerusalem to Irian Jaya and Daughters of the Church.

== Early life and education ==
Ruth Anne Stellrecht was born on July 17, 1945, in Spooner, Wisconsin, to Percy W. Stellrecht, a farmer, and Jennie Stellrecht (née Carlton), a nurse’s aide. She earned a Bachelor of Arts degree from LeTourneau College in 1967, followed by a Master of Arts degree from Baylor University in 1969. She completed her doctoral studies in history at Northern Illinois University, receiving a Ph.D. in 1979.

== Career ==
Tucker began her academic career as an instructor at the Grand Rapids School of the Bible and Music, where she taught from 1978 to 1987. She later became a visiting professor at Trinity Evangelical Divinity School beginning in 1982 and at Moffat College of Bible in Kijabe, Kenya, from 1985 to 1989.

She joined Calvin College in Grand Rapids, Michigan, as an adjunct interim professor in 1987 and also worked as an adjunct interim professor at Fuller Theological Seminary during the summers of 1990 and 1993. She taught at Calvin Theological Seminary from 2000 to 2006.

== Scholarship and writing ==
Tucker has written and co-written books on Christian history, missions, women in ministry, and contemporary religious movements. Her books include From Jerusalem to Irian Jaya: A Biographical History of Christian Missions (1983; second edition 2004) and (with Walter Liefeld) Daughters of the Church: Women and Ministry From New Testament Times to the Present (1987). More recently, Tucker published the book Walking Away from Faith: Unraveling the Mystery of Belief and Unbelief (2003) which examines religious doubt and loss of faith.

Several of Tucker's books address the history of women in Christianity, including Women and the Church, Daughters of the Church, and Guardians of the Great Commission. Other works address religious doubt and evangelical life.

== Awards and honors ==
Tucker received the Gold Medallion Award from the Christian Publishers Association in 1984 for From Jerusalem to Irian Jaya: A Biographical History of Christian Missions and again in 1989 for First Ladies of the Parish: Historical Portraits of Pastors’ Wives.

== Personal life ==
Tucker married Lyman Rand Tucker Jr. in 1968, and together they had one child. They later divorced, and in 2004 Tucker married John Worst, a college professor.

== Controversy ==
In 2005–2006, Ruth Tucker’s tenure at Calvin Theological Seminary became the subject of public dispute when she left her faculty position and alleged gender bias and discrimination against the seminary administration. Tucker, appointed in 2000 as the first full-time female professor in the seminary’s history, stated that she had been excluded and sidelined by administrators and was held to different standards than her male colleagues; she described her experience as a “nightmare” and posted a detailed account of her grievances on her website. Tucker said that her removal from the tenure track in 2003 and subsequent terminal appointment were the result of gender discrimination. Tucker’s allegations included claims that administrators misrepresented events and covered up her internal appeals.

An ad hoc committee of the seminary's board and independent mediators reviewed Tucker's complaints. Neither found evidence of purposeful gender discrimination, but both concluded that she had been treated unfairly. The board committee found some evidence of gender and diversity insensitivity in her evaluations and concluded that she should have received a regular two-year reappointment in 2003. The mediators similarly concluded that the lack of full faculty support justified delaying her progress toward tenure but not removing her from the tenure track. They recommended reappointment as a full professor without tenure and retroactive pay.

== Selected works ==
- Tucker, Ruth A. (1979). How to Set Up Your Own Neighborhood Preschool. New Rochelle, NY: Arlington House.
- Tucker, Ruth A. (1983). From Jerusalem to Irian Jaya: A Biographical History of Christian Missions. Zondervan.
- Tucker, Ruth A. (1986). Women and the Church: A History of Changing Perspectives. Zondervan.
- Tucker, Ruth A.; Liefeld, Walter L. (1987). Daughters of the Church: A History of Women and Ministry from New Testament Times to the Present. Zondervan.
- Tucker, Ruth A. (1988). First Ladies of the Parish: Historical Portraits of Pastors’ Wives. Zondervan.
- Tucker, Ruth A. (1988). Guardians of the Great Commission: The Story of Women in Modern Missions. Zondervan.
- Tucker, Ruth A. (1989). Another Gospel: Alternative Religions and the New Age Movement. Zondervan.
- Tucker, Ruth A. (1989). Sacred Stories: Daily Devotions from the Family of God. Zondervan.
- Tucker, Ruth A. (1992). Women in the Maze: Questions and Answers on Biblical Equality. Zondervan.
- Tucker, Ruth A. (1992). Multiple Choices: Making Wise Decisions in a Complicated World—A Women’s Guide. Zondervan.
- Tucker, Ruth A. (1994). The Family Album: Portraits of Family Life through the Centuries. Zondervan.
- Tucker, Ruth A. (1996). Seasons of Motherhood: A Garden of Memories. Zondervan.
- Tucker, Ruth A. (1999). Not Ashamed: The Story of Jews for Jesus. Zondervan.
- Tucker, Ruth A. (2002). Walking Away from Faith: Unraveling the Mystery of Belief and Unbelief. Zondervan.
- Tucker, Ruth A. (2005). God Talk: Cautions for Those Who Hear the Voice of God. Zondervan.
- Tucker, Ruth A. (2006). Left Behind in a Megachurch World. Zondervan.
- Tucker, Ruth A. (2015). Parade of Faith: A Biographical History of the Christian Church. IVP Academic.
- Tucker, Ruth A. (2016). Extraordinary Women of Christian History: What We Can Learn from Their Struggles and Triumphs. IVP Books.
- Tucker, Ruth A. (2016). Black and White Bible, Black and Blue Wife: My Story of Finding Hope after Domestic Abuse. IVP Books.
- Tucker, Ruth A. (2017). Katie Luther, First Lady of the Reformation: The Unconventional Life of Katharina von Bora. IVP Books.
