= Tamar Geller =

Israeli dog trainer

Tamar Geller (Hebrew: תמר גרלר) is a dog trainer who developed "TheLoved Dog" method of dog training. After serving as an intelligence officer working with the Israeli special forces, she spent time observing wolves in the wild and studying how parent canines trained their young. By using similar techniques to the wolves, she created a method for training puppies which does not involve aggression, dominance, or choke chains. She is the founder of the first cage-free dog boarding and day care center in southern California, called The Loved Dog. Her book of the same name teaches dog-owners methods to train their dogs in a nonaggressive way.

Geller works with various animal rights organizations including the Humane World for Animals, ASPCA, Best Friends Animal Society, PETA, Helen Woodward Animal Center, and rescue organizations. She conducts speeches and programs for rescue organizations, and has lectured on animal behavior at Pepperdine University near Malibu, California. She regularly contributes to a blog for the Rescue Proud magazine.

Geller trains the dogs of several celebrities including Oprah Winfrey, Ellen DeGeneres, Larry King, Jon Stewart, Ben Affleck, Charlize Theron, Natalie Portman, Owen Wilson, Kelly Ripa, Brad Paisley, Julianne Hough, Ryan Seacrest, and Colbie Caillat. She has appeared on various television programs and in media outlets. Those include Today, Oprah, Ellen, Animal Planet, Larry King Live, USA Today, LA Weekly, Travel + Leisure, Men's Health, Regis & Kelly, 20/20, Newsweek, The New York Times, USA Today, the Los Angeles Times E!, Entertainment Tonight, More, Access Hollywood, Extra, HLN, Us Weekly, GQ, and Fox News.

== Published works ==
- Geller, Tamar (12 October 2010). 30 Days to a Well-Mannered Dog: The Loved Dog Method. Simon and Schuster. ISBN 978-1439177709.
- Geller, Tamar; Cagan, Andrea (14 October 2008). The Loved Dog: The Playful, Nonaggressive Way to Teach Your Dog Good Behavior. Simon and Schuster. ISBN 978-1-4165-9398-0.
- Celebrate Your Dog! The Loved Dog Way of Training (DVD), 2007
