= The New Believers =

Book by David V. Barrett

The New Believers: A Survey of Sects, 'Cults', and Alternative Religions
- Cover of the hardcover edition
- Author: David V. Barrett
- Language: English
- Subject: New religious movements
- Publisher: Cassell Illustrated
- Publication date: 2001
- Publication place: United Kingdom
- Media type: Print (Hardcover)
- Pages: 559
- ISBN: 0-304-35592-5
- OCLC: 44933824
- Dewey Decimal: 291 21
- LC Class: BP603 .B37 2001

The New Believers: A Survey of Sects, 'Cults', and Alternative Religions, is a book by David V. Barrett covering the origin, history, beliefs, practices and controversies of more than sixty new religious movements, including The Family International (previously known as the Children of God), International Church of Christ, Osho (Rajneesh), Satanism, New Kadampa Tradition, Wicca, Druidry, chaos magic, Scientology, and others.

In The Daily Telegraph reviewer Demian Thompson wrote:

For connoisseurs of strange religion, here are riches indeed: gorgeously clad occult bishops who believe in both transubstantiation and reincarnation, neo-pagans whose sacred text is a science-fiction novel, the growing band of Rastafarian Maoris, and Holy Trinity Brompton’s Alpha Course. David Barrett’s The New Believers is an excellent guide to fringe religions that juxtaposes “respectable” movements and those conventionally dismissed as cults. And quite right too. By considering them together, he uncovers some disconcerting family likenesses and demonstrates that the eccentricities of personal revelation can disturb and refresh every religious tradition, be it Anglican or anthroposophist. [...] Ironically, anti-cult organizations are also susceptible to fanaticism and scandal: one of the cleverest things about this book is the way it anatomizes them alongside the cults.

David V. Barrett in the Skeptical Inquirer wrote:

A comprehensive guide to new religious movements. The book takes a comparative religion approach; it treats no theological position as more true, valid, or sound than any other. The author says he has aimed not just for fairness but for accuracy. Part One deals with major issues of alternative religions, including what is a cult and what is a real religion, conversion and recruitment, problems for family members, problems for leaving a movement, and cult-watchers and experts. Part Two contains entries on individual movements, organized into five sections: Christian origins, Other "Religions of the Book" origins, Eastern origins, Esoteric and neo-Pagan movements, and personal development.

Patrick Curry in The Independent wrote:

In his introduction, Barrett demonstrates just how contingent are the lines drawn between "sect" (relatively neutral), "cult" (a sect we don't like) and a "religion" (a sect that has made it into the mainstream). He also introduces useful distinctions between anti-cultists, counter-cult movements – which try to enforce a return to religious rectitude – and academic observers: pre-eminently, in Britain, Inform (Information Network Focus on Religious Movements). He discusses cultic "brain-washing" and the now largely discredited practice of "deprogramming". Barrett's analysis will be as useful to concerned parents and teachers as to disinterested students of the subject.
