= Andrea Cagan =

American writer, biographer and ghostwriter

- Occupations: biographer, writer
- Website: www.andreacagan.com

Andrea Cagan is an American writer, biographer and ghostwriter. She has edited and collaborated on more than fifteen books, including biographies of Diana Ross, Grace Slick, Joan Lunden and Prem Rawat. She has brought a dozen books to the bestseller lists, including three New York Times number-one bestsellers and one Los Angeles Times number-one bestseller.

Cagan appeared in the 1970 anti-Vietnam War film Captain Milkshake, which saw a revival in 2003.

== Bibliography ==
Authored

- Peace Is Possible: The Life and Message of Prem Rawat, Mighty River Press (2007), ISBN 978-0-9788694-9-6
- Awakening the Healer Within - (1990), Fireside, ISBN 0-671-70087-1
- Memoirs of a Ghost
- A Friendly Guide to Writing and Ghostwriting

Co-authored

- Diana Ross, Secrets of a Sparrow, Random House, ISBN 0-517-16622-4
- Marianne Williamson, A Return to Love: Reflections on the Principles of "A Course in Miracles, Harper Paperbacks, ISBN 0-06-092748-8
- Marianne Williamson, A Woman's Worth (1994), Chivers North America, ISBN 0-7927-1843-7
- Lynda Obst, Hello, He Lied -- and Other Tales from the Hollywood Trenches (1997), Broadway, ISBN 0-7679-0041-3
- Marianne Williamson, Illuminata: A Return to Prayer (1995), Riverhead Trade, ISBN 1-57322-520-7
- Romancing the Bicycle: The 5 spokes of Balance, with Jhonny G., Mad Dog Athletics (2000), ISBN 978-0-9703257-0-9
- Tamar Geller, The Loved Dog (2007) Simon & Schuster, Print Pages: 256 Print ISBN 1-4169-3814-1, eBook ISBN 1-4165-6297-4
- The Loved Dog: The Playful, Nonaggressive Way to Teach Your Dog Good Behavior - (2007) With Deborah Feingold and Tamar Geller, Simon Spotlight Entertainment HC (May 22, 2007), ASIN B000QXCZNQ, ISBN 1-4169-3814-1
- Up and Running : The Jami Goldman Story, Atria Books (2001). ISBN 0-7434-2420-4
- Joan Lunden's a Bend in the Road Is Not the End of the Road: 10 Positive Principles For Dealing With Change - (1998) With Joan Lunden, William Morrow, ISBN 0-688-16083-2
- Somebody to Love?: A Rock-and-Roll Memoir - (1999), with Grace Slick, Warner Books, ISBN 0-446-60783-5
- Make Up Your Life: Every Woman's Guide to the Power of Makeup (2000), with Victoria Jackson, QVC Publishing, ISBN 0-06-019639-4
- Held Hostage: The True Story of a Mother and Daughter's Kidnapping - (2006), with Michelle Renee, Berkley (2006), ISBN 978-0-425-21301-8
