= Paul Schnabel =

Dutch politician and sociologist

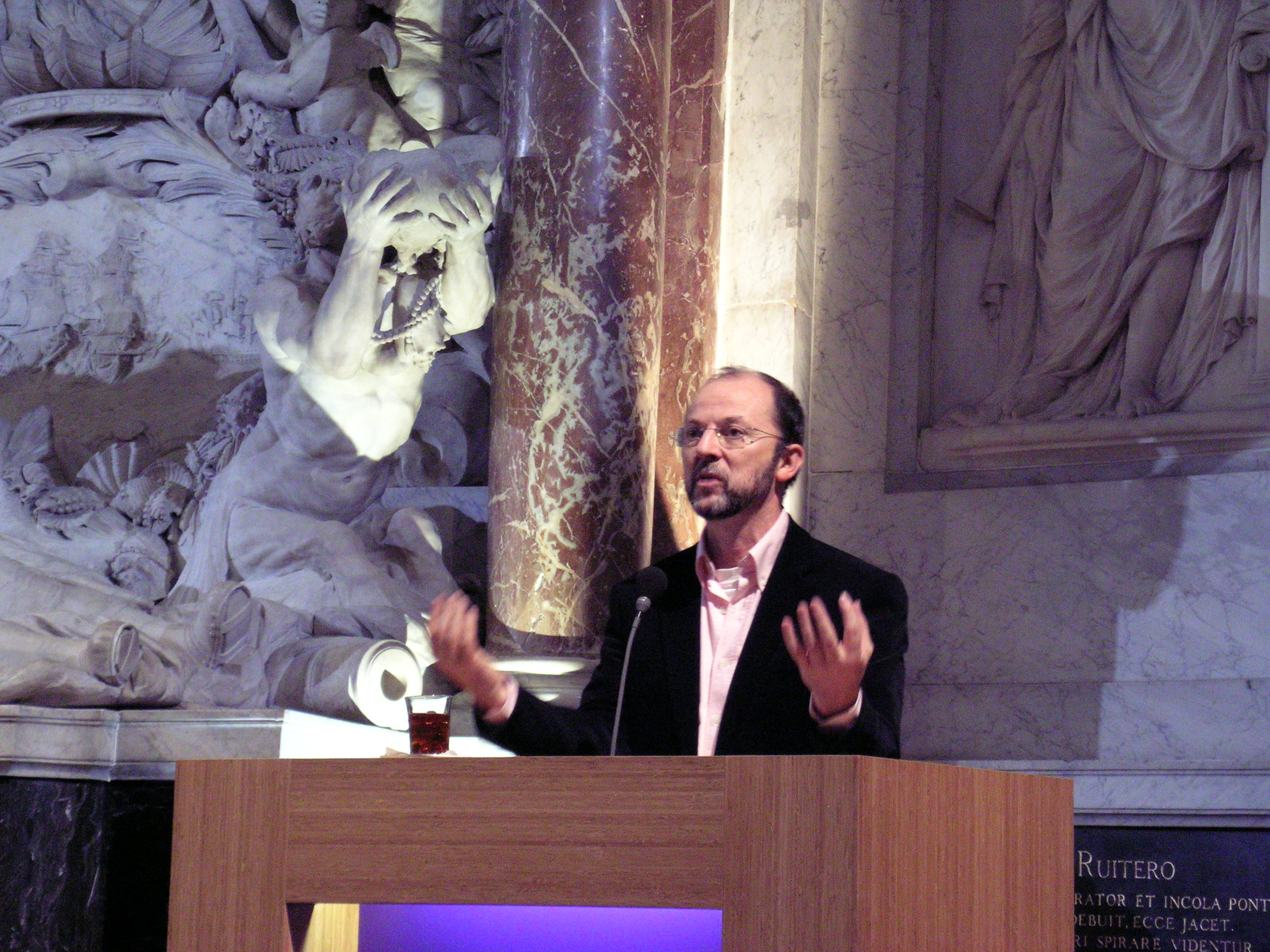
- Schnabel at a 2006 Een Land Een Samenleving event in Amsterdam's Nieuwe Kerk

Senator of the Netherlands
- In office 9 June 2015 – 11 June 2019

Personal details
- Born: 17 July 1948 (age 77) Bergen op Zoom, Netherlands
- Party: Democrats 66
- Occupation: Sociologist

Paul Schnabel (born 17 July 1948) is a Dutch politician and sociologist who served on the Social and Economic Council (SER) from 2013 to 2015 and in the Senate on behalf of Democrats 66 (D66) from 2015 until 2019.

Schnabel, a professor at Utrecht University, previously served as director of The Netherlands Institute for Social Research, an agency within the Government of the Netherlands, from 1998 to 2013, when he was appointed to the SER by the Crown.

In 2013, upon leading office as SCP director, he was made a Knight in the Order of the Netherlands Lion.

== Biography ==
A native of Bergen op Zoom, Schnabel grew up in Breda. He studied sociology at Utrecht University and Bielefeld University. He received his PhD in 1982 for his dissertation on new religious movements and mental health.

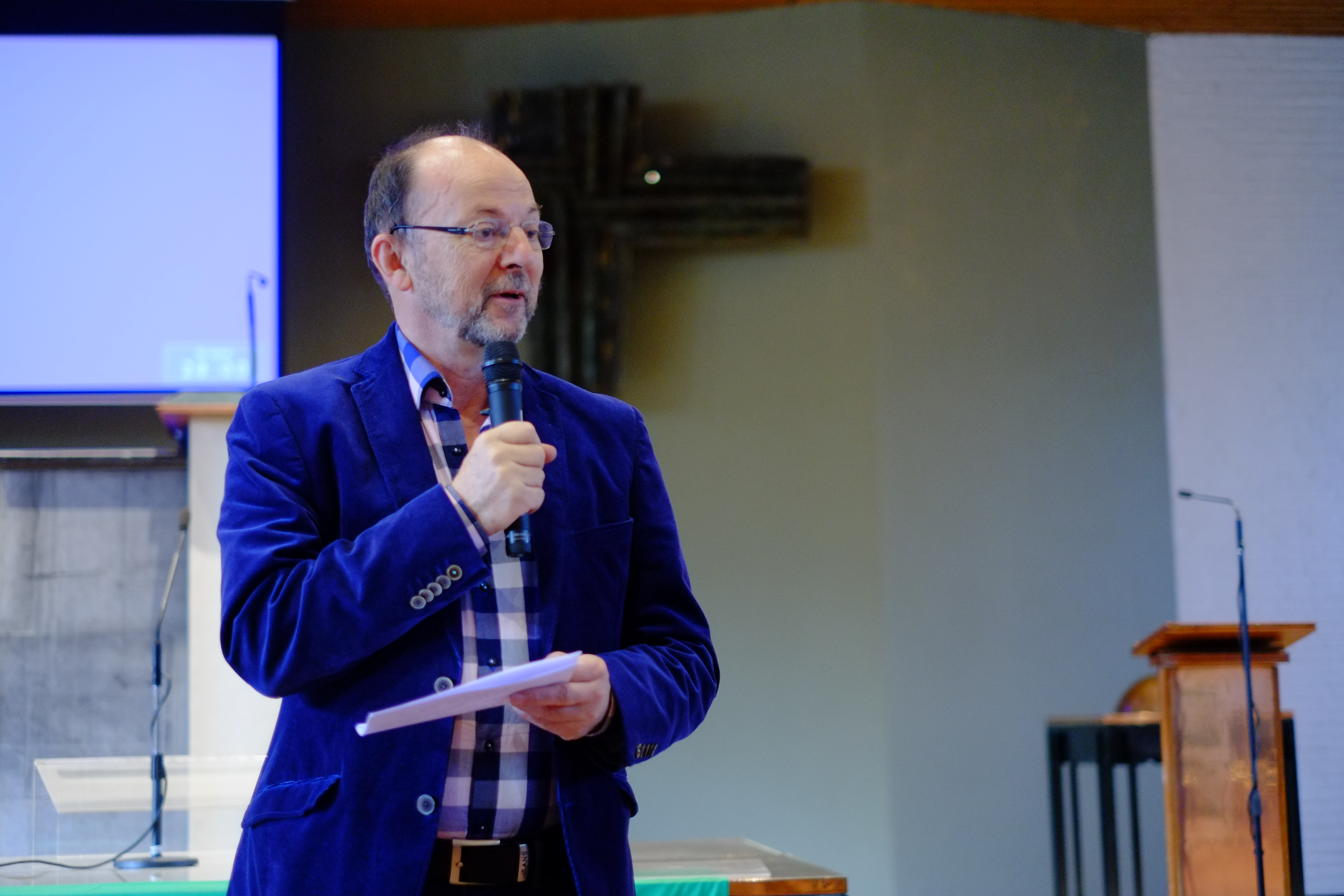
Schnabel speaking in Utrecht in 2015

Apart from his work for the SCP he worked with several institutions in Dutch society such as the Netherlands Institute for Art History (RKD) and the Scientific Council for Government Policy (WRR). He is a columnist to the Dutch newspapers NRC and Het Financieele Dagblad. As of 2008, he is also the chairman of the committee that selected the 1,000 texts deemed as "key" of the Dutch and Flemish cultural history for the Digital library for Dutch literature.

In 2015, he was placed seventh on the Democrats 66 list for the Senate and elected. In addition to his role in Parliament, Schnabel served as a member of the Dutch delegation to the Parliamentary Assembly of the Council of Europe from 2015. As member of D66, he was part of the Alliance of Liberals and Democrats for Europe group (ALDE). In Parliament, he was a member of the Committee on Culture, Science, Education and Media; the Committee on Social Affairs, Health and Sustainable Development; the Subcommittee on Public Health and Sustainable Development; and the Subcommittee on Culture, Diversity and Heritage.

From 2006 de Volkskrant listed him in its top ten of the most influential persons in the Netherlands for a few years.

== Selected bibliography ==
- Tussen stigma en charisma: nieuwe religieuze bewegingen en geestelijke volksgezondheid/Between stigma and charisma: new religious movements and mental health Erasmus university Rotterdam, Faculty of Medicine, Ph.D. thesis, ISBN 90-6001-746-3 (Deventer, Van Loghum Slaterus, 1982) available on the internet
- De weerbarstige geestesziekte: naar een nieuwe sociologie van de geestelijke gezondheidszorg, 1995, SUN (with Derksen, Jan)
