= Soul Rush =

1978 book by Sophia Collier

- Author: Sophia Collier
- Language: English
- Subject: Spiritual development
- Genre: Autobiography
- Publisher: William Morrow & Co.
- Publication date: 1978
- Publication place: United States
- Pages: 240
- ISBN: 0-688-03276-1
- OCLC: 3327890

Soul Rush: The Odyssey of a Young Woman of the '70s is a 1978 autobiography written by Sophia Collier. The book describes the author's personal spiritual development, use of drugs and cultivating of Eastern spiritual practices. After going on a spiritual journey, Collier returned home to write the book in 1976, and sold it at the age of nineteen. The book was published by William Morrow & Co.

== Synopsis ==
In the book, Collier describes her experiences with recreational drug use, including marijuana and LSD, and then her introduction to Eastern spirituality through life on an ashram. At age sixteen, Collier had become friends with Abbie Hoffman, then moved to live first on a commune and later a Divine Light Mission ashram. The book describes her initiation to the Techniques of Knowledge of Guru Maharaj ji (also known as Prem Rawat) and her experiences in the organization.

Years later, in an interview published in 2001 in Fast Company magazine, Collier stated that "At the ashram, we did things like staying up all night and meditating, things that taught us how to focus our minds". Skills that she still applies in stressful business situations, and that "drawing on those experiences has definitely helped me maintain perspective."

== Reception ==
Fast Company magazine characterized the work as a "precocious autobiography." In the article, Ron Lieber wrote that the work "..reads like a diary of the brainy, excruciatingly self-aware girl that she was." Lieber went on to note that though an experience in an ashram might not always be as applicable as an MBA, the spiritual experiences described by Collier in her autobiography helped her notice industry gaps and utilize a competitive advantage. Daniel Cuff described the work in The New York Times as "a memoir of growing up." According to The Boston Globe, the book became a Book-of-the-Month-Club selection soon after it was published.
