= The Netherlands Institute for Social Research =

Dutch interdepartmental scientific institute

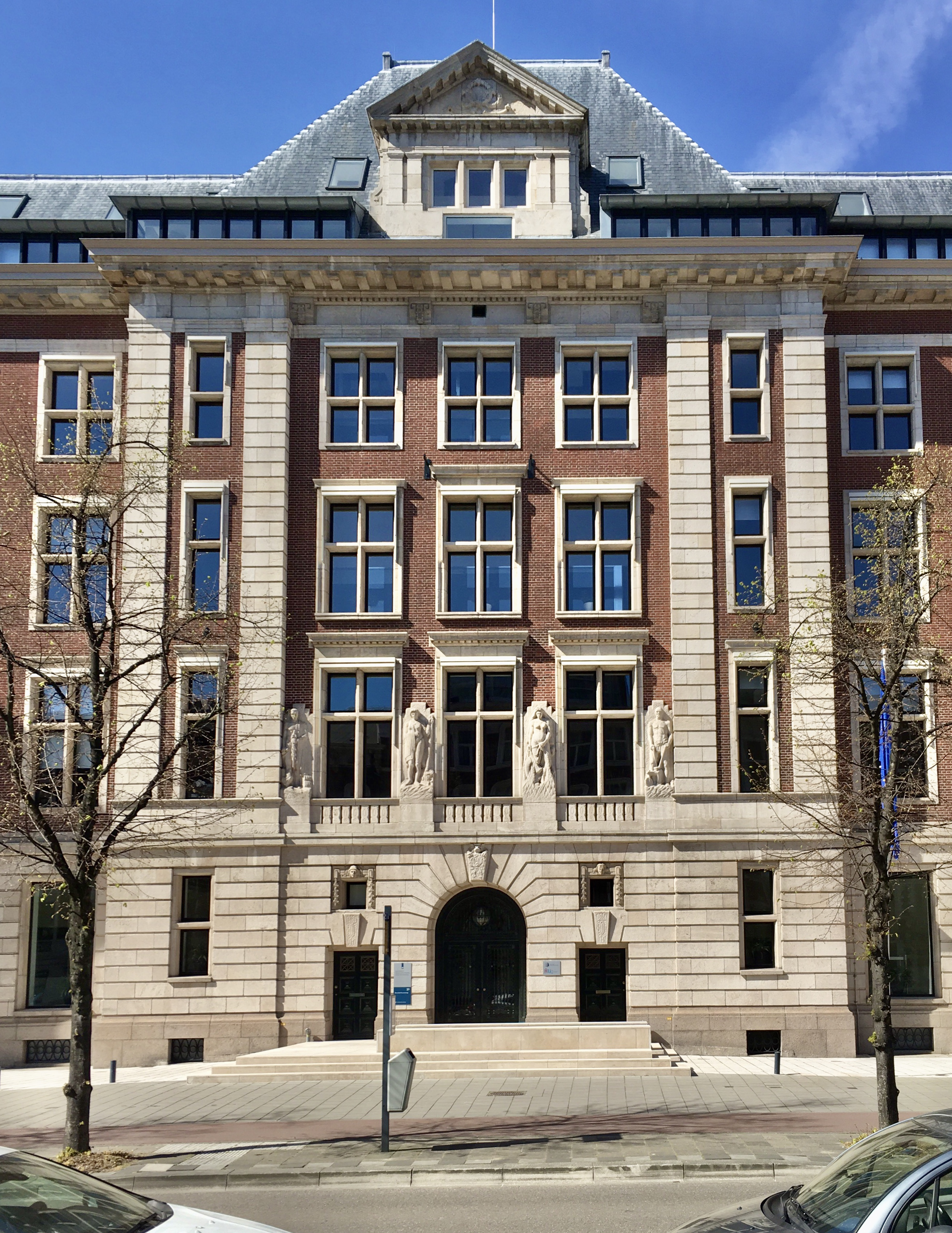
Headquarters at Bezuidenhoutseweg 30 in The Hague

The Netherlands Institute for Social Research (Dutch: Sociaal en Cultureel Planbureau or SCP) is a Dutch interdepartmental scientific institute that carries out solicited and unsolicited social scientific research. The SCP reports to the government, the Senate and House of Representatives, the ministries and social and government organisations. The SCP is formally part of the Ministry of Health, Welfare and Sport. The SCP was established by Royal Decree on March 30, 1973. The Netherlands has two planning offices. The oldest is the Bureau for Economic Policy Analysis (CPB), which is mainly concerned with economic development. The Netherlands Environmental Assessment Agency focuses primarily on spatial planning and the sustainability and quality of the living environment.
