= Sophia Collier =

American investor, artist, and entrepreneur

- Known for: Soho Natural Soda

Sophia Collier is an American investor, artist, and entrepreneur. She co-founded Soho Natural Soda in 1977, later selling the company to Seagram Beverage Company. Collier also founded Citizens Advisers Inc., a mutual fund management company focused on socially responsible investing, before transitioning to large-scale art projects inspired by natural water surfaces. Her work has been exhibited internationally and included in the U.S. Department of State's Art in Embassies program.

== Biography ==
In 1977, at 21, Sophia Collier developed Soho Natural Soda in her kitchen in Brooklyn, New York and co-founded the American Natural Beverage Corp with Constance Best to distribute the product. Collier was among the first wave of young women establishing startups in the early 1980s and was recognized in the first "40 under 40" by Crane's New York Business.

The company grew to $25 million in soft drink sales before the partners sold it to Seagram Beverage Company in 1989 for a reported US$15 million.

Written in 1976, and published in 1978, Collier produced a book about her teen-aged life entitled Soul Rush in which she recounts her spiritual development, experimentation with recreational drug use and Eastern mysticism as a teenager.

In 1991, Collier established Citizens Advisers Inc., a mutual fund management company where Collier was the portfolio manager of Citizens Index Fund which achieved a five star rating by Morningstar, placing it in the top 10% of funds within its category. At Citizens, Collier also managed the E-fund which achieved a #1 in its category shortly after it was established according to ranking service IBC/Donoghue and was called "among the more interesting products to emerge from the money fund arena in years." The E-fund incorporated a debit card and was designed to allow investors to receive back a portion of the fees charged to retailers. Collier also focused on investing in emerging wireless technologies. She took a leading role in obtaining regulatory approval for a novel system that increased wireless data transmission capacity.

Citizens Funds was sold to Sentinel Investments in April 2008. In explaining the timing of the sale, Collier noted a concern for a market bubble and also her successful treatment for breast cancer.

While in New Hampshire Collier was active in Democratic politics, serving as Treasurer and Finance Chair of the State Democratic Party from 1994 - 2006.

After the sale, Collier established an investment office with Chula Reynolds as well as an art studio in Sausalito, California using software and large scale machine tools to making sculptural reliefs of water surfaces. In her artist statement she describes her inspiration as "One day I was walking across a bridge and thought I wish I could just reach down into the water and pick up a piece of that shining surface and keep it forever."

Collier drew a connection with her prior financial work stating that it allowed her " to know it was possible to develop software to model vast, turbulent, nonlinear data sets like money … and also, maybe, water in motion." In December 2014 a signature work, Plank of Water exhibited at the Grand Rapids Art Museum and the United States Department of State has included her work in the Art In Embassies program.

In her investing work since 2008 Collier has focused in early stage venture investing, real estate and the financial markets. She has also become an active member of the San Francisco Bay Area angel investing community participating as a judge and panel member in Pitchforce and similar events. A representative real estate project is the $10 million dollar renovation of Zocalo Apartments in Houston, Texas where Collier and Reynolds have also organized an artist-in-residence program.

== Bibliography ==
- Collier, Sophia (1978). Soul Rush: The Odyssey of a Young Woman of the '70s. New York: Morrow. ISBN 0-688-03276-1.
