= Jan van der Lans =

Dutch psychologist

- Born: 10 July 1933; The Hague, Netherlands
- Died: 6 July 2002 (aged 68); Netherlands
- Education: Abbey of Berne in Heeswijk; Catholic University of Nijmegen
- Known for: Religious experience and meditation
- Scientific career
- Fields: Psychology of religion
- Workplaces: Catholic University of Nijmegen
- Doctoral advisor: Han Fortmann

Johannes (Jan) Maria van der Lans (10 July 1933 – 6 July 2002) was a Dutch professor in the psychology of religion at the Catholic University of Nijmegen (now called Radboud University Nijmegen).

== Education ==
Van der Lans was born in The Hague. After his secondary education he studied from 1953 until 1960 philosophy and theology at the abbey of Berne in Heeswijk. He was a member of this monastery until 1968. He started studying psychology at the Catholic University of Nijmegen in 1961. One of his teachers was Han Fortmann. In 1967 he was accepted as a full-time employee of the university. In 1978 he received his doctorate for his dissertation on Religious experience and meditation (Dutch: Religieuze ervaring en meditatie).

== Research ==
From 1977 onwards he did research among followers of new religious movements. In 1979 he instigated a European platform of psychologists of religion and until 1997 he was chairperson of the International Committee of European Psychologists of Religion. In 1992 he became a professor in the psychology of religion at the university. Van der Lans was involved in the International Association for the Psychology of Religion (German: Internationale Gesellschaft für Religionspsychologie) and as of 1998 part of its executive committee. He was also a member of the Commission Internationale de Psychologie Religieuse Scientifique.

According to one of his colleagues, his work was not without theological preferences and bias, but he presented himself as an empirically oriented psychologist.

== Professional associations ==
From 1997 to his death, he was chair of the Netherlands-based Catholic Study Center for Mental Health (Dutch Katholiek Studiecentrum voor Geestelijke Volksgezondheid, usually abbreviated as KSGV, an organization that undertakes its activities from a Christian inspiration) and wrote several books commissioned by them.

== Selected bibliography ==
=== English ===
- Lans, J. van der Therapeutic Importance of Yoga and Meditation. Gedrag: Tijdschrift voor Psychologie 3, no. 2 (1975): 49-62.
- Lans, J. van der . Religious Experience and Meditation Psychology 14 (1979): 154-164.
- Lans, J. van der (1987) The Value of Sundén's Role-Theory Demonstrated and Tested with Respect to Religious Experiences in Meditation in the "Journal for the Scientific Study of Religion", Vol. 26, No. 3 (Sep., 1987), pp. 401–412
- F. Derks, Lans, J. van der " Post-cult syndrome Fact or Fiction? ", paper presented at conference of Psychologists of Religion, Catholic University Nijmegen, 1981, also appeared in Dutch language as Post-cult-syndroom; feit of fictie?, published in the magazine Religieuze bewegingen in Nederland/Religious movements in the Netherlands nr. 6 pages 58–75 published by the Free University of Amsterdam (1983)
- Derks, Frans, and Jan M. van der Lans. 1983. Subgroups in Divine Light Mission Membership: A Comment on Downton in the book Of Gods and Men: New Religious Movements in the West. Macon edited by Eileen Barker, GA: Mercer University Press, (1984)
- Lans, Jan van der and Frans Derks Premies Versus Sannyasins originally published in Update: A Quarterly Journal on New Religious Movements, X/2 (June 1986)
- Richardson, James J., J. van der Lans, and F. Derks. 1986. "Leaving and Labeling: Voluntary and Coerced Disaffiliation from Religious Social Movements." Research in Social Movements, Conflicts and Change. 9:97-126.
- Janssen, J. Lans, J. van der, & Dechesne, M. (2001). Fundamentalism. The possibilities and limitations of a social-psychological approach. In Henten, van W.-J. Religious identity and the invention of tradition. New NOSTER series (STAR).
- Janssen, J. Prins, M., Lans, J. van der, & Baerveldt, J. (2001) The structure and variety of prayer. An empirical study of Dutch youth in Journal of Empirical Theology

=== Dutch ===
- Derks, F. and J.M. van der Lans (1983) Het post-cult-syndroom: feit of fictie? in Religieuze bewegingen in Nederland, 6, 58-75.
- Derks, F. and J.M. van der Lans (1985) Van het pad gevallen: de gevolgen van uittreding uit nieuwe religieuze bewegingen in Religieuze bewegingen in Nederland, 10, 66-103.
- In de spiegel van de mythe herken ik mijzelf. In: Religieuze symbolen in psychotherapie (Dutch language) (1987)
- Jan van der Lans, Cécile Nijsten & Margo Rooijackers: Culturele zingevingssystemen en subjectief welbevinden. Een onderzoek onder allochtone jongeren. In: Wat baat religie? (Dutch) (1998)
- Ten geleide. In: Alleenstaan. Een onderbelichte vorm van samenleven (1999)
- Janssen, J., Maerten Prins, Cor Baerveldt & Jan van der Lans: Structuur en varianten van bidden. Een onderzoek bij Nederlandse jongeren. In: Wat baat religie? Nijmegen: KSGV, 67-96. (Dutch language) (1998) Nijmegen: KSGV, 67-96.
- Ten geleide. In: Zin op school. Zingeving in het voortgezet onderwijs (Dutch) (2000)
- Ten geleide. In: Spiritualiteit in psychotherapie? (Dutch) (2001)
- Prins, M., Lans, van der J. & Janssen, J. (1998) The house of God: religie en extase. Psychologie en Maatschappij, 22 (3), 252-263. (Dutch)
