= David V. Barrett =

British writer and editor

David V. Barrett is a British sociologist of religion who has widely written on topics pertaining to new religious movements and western esotericism. He is also a regular contributor to The Independent, Fortean Times, and the Catholic Herald.

Barrett received his PhD in the Sociology of Religion from the London School of Economics. He was an intelligence analyst for the UK Government Communications Headquarters and the United States' government's National Security Agency prior to his career as a writer.

He has been involved in science fiction critique, having edited Vector, the critical journal of the British Science Fiction Association in the late 1980s, and organized and chaired the Arthur C. Clarke Award for three years.

== Bibliography ==
- Encyclopedia of Prediction: Fate, Fortune & Foretelling the Future, (1992); ISBN 0-8317-8195-5
- Predictions Library - Dreams, (1995); ISBN 0-13-230947-5
- Predictions Library - Palmistry (1995)
- Predictions Library - Graphology (1995)
- Predictions Library - Numerology (1995)
- The New Believers: Sects, 'Cults' and Alternative Religions (1996). Reissued as The New Believers: A Survey of Sects, Cults, and Alternative Religions (2001) ISBN 1-84403-040-7
- A Brief History of Secret Societies: The Hidden Powers of Clandestine Organizations and Elites from the Ancient World to the Present Day (2007); ISBN 0-7867-1983-4
- A Brief Guide to Secret Religions: A Complete Guide to Hermetic, Pagan, and Esoteric Beliefs (2011) ISBN 978-1-84901-595-0
