= Reender Kranenborg =

Dutch scholar of religion

- Born: June 1, 1942; Groningen, Netherlands
- Died: April 8, 2020 (aged 77)

Academic work
- Discipline: Theologian

Reender Kranenborg (1 June 1942 – 8 April 2020) was a Dutch theologian, pastor, and scholar of religion. He was editor of the magazine Religious Movement in the Netherlands published by the institute of religious studies of the Free University in Amsterdam. He researched cults as well as the anti-cult movement in the Netherlands.

== Early life and education ==
Kranenborg was born 1 June 1942 in the city of Groningen. He studied at the Vrije Universiteit Amsterdam, before becoming a pastor.

He received his PhD in 1974, in the theological faculty about the subject of self-realization. He stated in the dissertation that he had attempted to research the subject following the norms of religious studies, not a theological one.

== Works ==
He was an editor of the magazine Religious Movement in the Netherlands published by the institute of religious studies of the Free University in Amsterdam. He researched cults as well as the anti-cult movement in the Netherlands. He wrote several books on religious topics, including Satanism and Eastern religions.

He retired in 2004. He had, until his retirement, a seat at the Comitato Scientifico (scientific committee) of the CESNUR.

== Death ==
Kranenborg died on 8 April 2020.

== Selected bibliography ==
English

- The Presentation of the Essenes in Western Esotericism. Journal of Contemporary Religion, 13 (2): 245- 256. (1998).
- New Religions in a Postmodern World (2003) Reender Kranenborg and Mikael Rothstein (Eds.) Aarhus University Press ISBN 87-7288-748-6
- Field Notes: Efraim: A New Apocalyptic Movement in the Netherlands in Nova Religio: The Journal of Alternative and Emergent Religions. 2004, Vol. 7, No. 3, Pages 81–91.
- Revelation and Experience in the Theosophical Tradition. A paper presented at CESNUR 2004 international conference, Baylor University, Waco (Texas), June 18-June 20, 2000. Available online

Dutch

- Zelfverwerkelijking: oosterse religies binnen een westerse subcultuur (1974) uitgegeven door J.H Kok Kampen Ph.D. dissertation
- Transcendente meditatie: Verlangen naar zinvol leven en religie, uitgegeven door Kok (1977) ISBN 90-242-2452-7
- Oosterse geloofsbewegingen in het Westen: Bhagwan-beweging, Hare Krishna gemeenschap, Transcendente Meditatie, Healthy-Happy-Holy-Organization, Divine Light Mission, Yoga, Verenigingskerk (1982), uitgegeven door Zomer en Keuning - Ede, ISBN 90-210-4965-1
- Een nieuw licht of de kerk?: bijdragen van nieuwe religieuze bewegingen voor de kerk van vandaag (1984), uitgegeven door Boekencentrum 's-Gravenhage ISBN 90-239-0809-0
- De School voor Filosofie als neo-hindoeïstische beweging (Religieuze bewegingen in Nederland), VU Uitgeverij (1985) ISBN 90-6256-416-X
- Woorden van de Meesters. Teksten van hedendaagse Indiase denkers over God, mens en wereld. Bijeengebracht, vertaald en ingeleid door Reender Kranenborg, Delft, Meinema, 1988, ISBN 90-211-3524-8
- Reïncarnatie en Christelijk geloof, Kampen, KOK, 1989, ISBN 9024244897
- Kranenborg Reender Dr., Stoker Wessel, red, Religies en (on)gelijkheid in een plurale samenleving, Leuven / Apeldoorn, Garant, 1995, ISBN 90-5350-391-9
- Neohindoeïstische bewegingen in Nederland : een encyclopedisch overzicht, uitgegeven door Kampen Kok (2002) ISBN 90-435-0493-9

French

- Mayer, Jean-François; ——, eds. (2004). La naissance des nouvelles religions (in French). Georg. ISBN 2-8257-0877-1.

Italian

- L’induismo published by Elledici, Leumann (Torino) 2003, ISBN 88-01-02728-1
