= Sacred Journeys =

Book by James V. Downton Jr.

- Book cover
- Author: James V. Downton, Jr.
- Language: English
- Subject: Divine Light Mission, Guru Maharaj Ji
- Genre: Sociology, Religious conversion
- Publisher: Columbia University Press
- Publication date: July 1979
- Publication place: United States
- Media type: Hardcover
- Pages: 245
- ISBN: 978-0-231-04198-0
- OCLC: 4638881

Sacred Journeys: The Conversion of Young Americans to Divine Light Mission is a sociological book about the adherents of the Divine Light Mission in the 1970s. In the work, author James V. Downton, Jr. analyzes a sample group of young Americans, and their conversion process to the ideals of the Divine Light Mission and their relationship with Guru Maharaj Ji, currently known as Prem Rawat.

Downton, a sociologist and professor emeritus of Sociology at the College of Arts and Sciences of the University of Colorado at Boulder, spent one month in an ashram and relied on interviews with eighteen followers, presenting a "vivid picture of the social and psychologically dynamics which led to their spiritual awakening". He followed the mission for a period of five years chronicling the followers' personal changes and the evolution of the movement itself. Downton himself later wrote an article in Journal for the Scientific Study of Religion, which explored these issues further. Downton also cited the work again, with co-author Wehr, in an article in Journal of Peace Research analyzing social activism and its relationship to pacifism.

The work is cited in other books and academic journal articles in various contexts including religious conversion and de-conversion in religions, cults and new religious movements, spirituality among descendants of Spanish Jews, participation in religion and others.

== Reviews ==
Review of Religious Research

Sacred Journeys is a study of conversion into the Divine Light Mission. It includes follow-up information on persons who remained and those who left the movement. [...] The book represents the work of a well-intentioned, compassionate sociologist living in a town where many important events of the Divine Light Mission were occurring. [...] The book has no great insights, no definitive findings and no challenging hypotheses. [...] He [Downton] skillfully intersperses quotations from the guru with his comments. In doing these things, he achieves more than sometimes in the making of books. Review of Religious Research, Vol. 21, No. 3. (Summer, 1980).

Sacred Journeys was also reviewed in The Annals of the American Academy of Political and Social Science.

== See also ==
- Religious conversion
