= Marc Galanter (psychiatrist) =

Marc Galanter is professor of psychiatry at New York University School of Medicine and has served as the Founding Director of the Division of Alcoholism and Drug Abuse. His studies have addressed family therapy for substance abuse, pharmacologic treatment for addiction, and Twelve Step recovery for addiction. He is an author of over 200 peer-reviewed articles. He chairs Twelve Step Interest Groups in AAAP, ASAM, and the International Society of Addiction Medicine and teaches at the New York University School of Medicine.

Galanter attended Albert Einstein College of Medicine (1969–1971) where he did his residency in psychiatry. After that he was a Clinical Associate at the National Institute of Mental Health and then an NIH Career Teacher. He later served as president of the Association for Medical Education and Research in Substance Abuse (AMERSA) (1976–1977), the American Academy of Addiction Psychiatry (1991–1992), and the American Society of Addiction Medicine (1999–2001).

== Books ==
- Galanter, Marc, ed. (1989). Cults and New Religious Movements: A Report of the American Psychiatric Association (1st ed.). Washington, D.C.: American Psychiatric Pub. ISBN 978-0890422120.
- Galanter, Marc (1993). Network therapy for alcohol and drug abuse: a new approach in practice. New York: Basic Books. ISBN 978-0465000999.
- Galanter, Marc (1999). Cults: Faith, Healing and Coercion (2 ed.). Oxford: Oxford University Press. ISBN 978-0195123708.
- Galanter, Marc (2005). Spirituality and the healthy mind : science, therapy, and the need for personal meaning. Oxford: Oxford University Press. ISBN 978-0195176698.
- Galanter, Marc; Kleber, Herbert D.; Brady, Kathleen (2015). Textbook of Substance Abuse Treatment, Fifth Edition. Washington DC: American Psychiatric Publishing. ISBN 978-1585624720.. Sixth Edition, 2023.
- Galanter, Marc (2016). What is Alcoholics Anonymous? A Path from Addiction to Recovery. Oxford: Oxford University Press. ISBN 978-0190276560.

== Articles ==
- Galanter, M; White, WL; Dennis, ML; Hunter, B; Passetti, L; Lustig, D (2025). "Patient characteristics associated with their level of twelve-step attendance prior to entry into treatment for substance use disorders". Addict Sci Clin Pract. 20 (1): 16. doi:10.1186/s13722-025-00542-5. PMC 11827301. PMID 39953607.

== See also ==
- List of cult and new religious movement researchers
- Sociological classifications of religious movements
