= Plagio =

Criminal offence in Italian law

Plagio in Italian criminal law was the offence encoded in article 603 of the Italian Penal Code, which read: "Whoever subjects a person to his power, in such a way as to reduce them to a total state of subjection, shall be punished by imprisonment from five to fifteen years." This provision was declared unconstitutional by the Constitutional Court by judgment no. 96 of 9 April 1981 (deposited 8 June 1981).

== Etymology ==
The Italian term plagio derives from Latin plagium ("subterfuge"), which in Roman law indicated the sale of a man known to be free as a slave, or the taking away — by persuasion or corruption — of another person's slave.

== Legislation in Italy ==
In criminal law, plagio was the offence contemplated by art. 603 of the penal code, which established the punishment of imprisonment from 5 to 15 years for whoever subjected "a person to his power so as to reduce them to a total state of subjection".

It was the Fascist delegated legislator, with the penal code approved in 1930 and still in force, who provided for the offence of plagio (art. 603) for the first time as a distinct offence from the crime of reduction to slavery (art. 600), contrary to the opinions expressed by the parliamentary commission entrusted with drafting the code, by the Royal commissions of lawyers and prosecutors of Naples and Rome and by the Court of Appeal of Naples. In the republican era (which started in 1946), initially the offence of plagio was considered a crime comparable to reduction to slavery; therefore, in the action of the plagiary upon the plagiate the intention to obtain an advantage had to be found. Subsequently, the Court of Cassation, on 26 May 1961, defined plagio as "the establishment of a psychic relationship of absolute subjection of the passive subject to the active subject".

Following a question of constitutional legitimacy, the Constitutional Court, with the above-cited judgment no. 96 of 8 June 1981 (President: Leonetto Amadei; rapporteur: Edoardo Volterra) held the constitutional illegitimacy of art. 603 c.p., effectively removing it from the criminal legal order, as it was contrary "to the principle of specificity of the offence contained in the absolute reservation of law in criminal matters, enshrined in Article 25 of the Constitution". Specifically, according to Professor Giovanni Flora, professor of criminal law at the University of Ferrara, the Court established the indeterminacy of the wording of the criminal offence "essentially adducing the unverifiability of the fact contemplated by the offence, the impossibility anyhow of its ascertainment by logical-rational criteria, and the intolerable risk of arbitrariness by the judging magistracy".

The judgment also states among other things:

Among psychologically normal individuals, the expression by one human being of ideas and convictions about other human beings can provoke the acceptance of the ideas and convictions thus expressed and give rise to a state of psychic subjection in the sense that this acceptance constitutes a transfer to others of the product of the agent's psychic activity and therefore a limitation of the determinism of the subject. This limitation, as has been scientifically identified and ascertained, can give rise to typical situations of psychic dependence which can also reach, for more or less long periods, high degrees as in the case of a love relationship, the relationship between priest and believer, between teacher and pupil, between doctor and patient, and can also give rise to relationships of mutual influence. But it is extremely difficult if not impossible to identify in practice and distinguish for legal consequence — with regard to hypotheses like the one in question — the psychic activity of persuasion from that also psychic activity of suggestion. There are no reliable criteria to separate and qualify one activity from the other and to ascertain the exact boundary between them.

— Constitutional Court, judgment no. 96/1981

=== Debate on the definition of psychological plagio ===
The psychoanalyst Sandro Gindro in L'oro della psicoanalisi judges the Constitutional Court's decision wise and maintains that from a psychological point of view love should be considered a form of "plagio", just as the relationship between psychotherapist and patient begins from a "plagio". Therefore, the Turin psychoanalyst argues, the law on plagio — had it not been struck down — could have sanctioned lawful behaviours protected by the fundamental principles of the Constitution.

=== The Braibanti and Grasso cases ===
In 1964 the provision was invoked against an artist and former local official of the Italian Communist Party: Aldo Braibanti, who was believed to have induced two young men, Piercarlo Toscani and Giovanni Sanfratello, then nineteen, into dependence on him by fascinating them with his artistic and philosophical ideas inspired by the libertarian Marxism of Herbert Marcuse and by an anarchic vision of life and social relations. The artist was arrested on 5 December 1967 and on 14 July 1968 was sentenced by the Assize Court of Rome to nine years' imprisonment; on 28 November 1969 the Court of Appeal reduced the sentence to four years and in 1971 the Court of Cassation upheld the conviction. Braibanti, benefiting from a sentence reduction for resistance merits, was released on 12 December 1969. In the years of the sexual revolution the story caused an outcry and generated a climate of protest, as well as the indignant reactions of Pier Paolo Pasolini, Umberto Eco, Alberto Moravia, Elsa Morante, Adolfo Gatti, Mario Gozzano, Cesare Musatti, Ginevra Bompiani and the Radicals of Marco Pannella. Braibanti remains the only person convicted in Italian history for the crime of plagio.

Subsequently, the law was invoked against Emilio Grasso, a priest belonging to the Charismatic Movement, accused by some parents of having plagiarised their minor children. On 2 October 1978 the examining magistrate at the Court of Rome raised a question of constitutional legitimacy of art. 603 before the Constitutional Court, pointing out the possibility that it violated Article 25 of the Constitution for lack of clarity. The Court, in judgment no. 96 of 1981, declared the unconstitutionality of article 603 of the penal code "as it conflicts with the principle of specificity of the offence contained in the absolute reservation of law in criminal matters, enshrined in Article 25 of the Constitution". After the judgment the priest was acquitted.

== Annulment ==
The crime of plagio had rarely been prosecuted in Italy, and only one person, Aldo Braibanti, was ever convicted after the Second World War, for his relations with a younger man he was accused of brainwashing into communism and homosexuality in 1964. It was later declared unconstitutional by the Constitutional Court with decision no. 96 of 8 June 1981. The court found the law to be so vague that it failed to meet the criteria set out in Article. 25 of the Constitution. Specifically, the substance of the crime was impossible to fully assess with logical-rational criteria, creating an intolerable risk of arbitrary prosecution and conviction. Indeed, the cited judgment reads:

In ancient law and until the beginning of the modern age the offence of plagio was inherent in the legal institution of slavery understood as the state of man not having legal personality [...]. From the end of the 18th century, with the progressive acceptance of the principle of equality of the legal status of persons and the consequent progressive abolition of slavery [...] it is conceived as a crime against individual liberty.

A few years after the declaration of unconstitutionality of the plagio at the presence of Leonetto Amadei, the President of the Constitutional Court of the Italian Republic, Mario Di Fiorino organized a scientific conference in Forte dei Marmi in 1989 on "Socially accepted persuasion, plagio and brainwashing", to discuss the new situation.

== Bills to reintroduce the offence of plagio ==
In recent decades in Italy several bills have been submitted to Parliament (for example the one presented to the Presidency of the Senate in April 1988 on the initiative of ministers Rosa Russo Iervolino and Giuliano Vassalli) to reintroduce the offence of psychological plagio, but Parliament has preferred not to deal with it because the offence is not ascertainable with scientific criteria and methods, and the offence exposes citizens to the risk of abuses by the judiciary.

Figures from the Catholic and Protestant worlds, together with various legal scholars, expressed concern about possible approval of the bill, specifically regarding the risks it would pose for freedom of religion.

In a resolution of 30 May 2005 the Commission of evangelical churches for relations with the State (CCERS) reiterated

its concern about bill 1777, under consideration in the Senate, which provides for the offence of mental manipulation. The wording is such as to constitute a danger even for religious freedom. It risks criminalising any conversion induced by preaching and example. CCERS believes that there is indeed a danger of coercion of the will of individuals by conditioning techniques. However, the indeterminacy of the offence seems to reproduce the aspects that at the time led to the declaration of unconstitutionality of the offence of plagio. CCERS also notes that it does not provide as a necessary condition of punishability an advantage for the agent, thus affecting every form of conviction and transmission of thought and faith.

Donatella Poretti, of the Association for the Rights of Users and Consumers (ADUC), criticised the bill as a "law against religion". In an excerpt of her article published on the ADUC website she argued that such a law would affect monasteries and convents, ironically alluding to the (often sexual) rules that characterise them:

We really cannot believe [...] that a judge with a 'priest-eater' spirit would not be able to perceive in monastic institutions places in which personalities are destructured, in which people are mentally manipulated. If one thinks that becoming a priest, friar or nun is equivalent to limiting that whole physical and sexual part of man or woman who takes vows ...

Vincenzo Donvito, president of ADUC, appealed to parliamentarians to prevent the bill on mental manipulation from being approved, warning that it could be used to undermine citizens' rights to diversity.

On the other hand, Dr Francesco De Fazio, director of the Institute of Forensic Medicine, of the School of Specialisation in Forensic Medicine and of the School of Specialisation in Clinical Criminology at the University of Modena, believes that although the Constitutional Court cancelled the offence, the concept of plagio itself remains a reality in interpersonal relationships, lamenting gaps in the protection of mental health, threatened, for example, in cases of recruitment by socially dangerous religious groups.

== Mental manipulation in other legal systems ==
In countries such as France, Spain and Belgium there are provisions on "mental manipulation". Such provisions have been criticised by the major religions, which see in them a danger to freedom of religion. Indeed, movements and organisations integrated in major religions — such as Opus Dei, the Legionaries of Christ, the Catholic Charismatic Renewal, the Focolarini, the Neocatechumenal Way, Communion and Liberation — have sometimes been accused of being sectarian realities dangerous for their members.

In Anglo-American legal systems there is no crime equivalent to the Italian offence of plagio. In an article published in the legal journal American Bar Association Journal in 1971, Albert Borowitz, a US lawyer and scholar of the history of criminal law, proposed the expression "psychological kidnapping" as an attempt to translate into English the Italian term for psychological plagio. In the same article the author likens the concept of plagio to the English concept of "brainwashing", noting how phenomena of coercive persuasion can be observed indiscriminately in concentration camps, in prisons, in seminaries, in the relationship between patient and psychotherapist or even, more simply, in love relationships or in relationships between parents and children.

== See also ==
- Brainwashing
- Mental manipulation
- Aldo Braibanti
- Cult

== Bibliography ==
=== Constitutional Court judgment and legal studies ===
- Judgment 9 April 1981, no. 96 of the Constitutional Court, deposited 8 June 1981.
- Coppi, Plagio, in Enc. dir., 943 s.
- Flick, La tutela della personalità nel delitto di plagio, Milan, 1972, 159 s.
- Giur. Cost. 1981, I, 806 s. with note by Grasso (P.G.) (Control over the correspondence to empirical reality of legal predictions of offence).
- Riv. it., 1981, 1147 s., with note by Boscarelli (On the principle of specificity).
- Tursi, Principi costituzionali e reato di plagio, Arch. pen., 1969, II, 344 s.
- Zuccalà, Il plagio nel sistema italiano di tutela della libertà. Riv. it., 1972, 380 s.

=== Plagio as mental manipulation and brainwashing ===
- Aletti, M. (Ed.) Psicoterapia o Religione? Nuovi fenomeni e movimenti religiosi alla luce della psicologia, Rome, LAS, 1994.
- Aletti, M., & Alberico, C. (1999). Tra brainwashing e libera scelta. Per una lettura psicologica dell'affiliazione ai Nuovi Movimenti Religiosi. In M. Aletti & G. Rossi (Eds.), Ricerca di sé e trascendenza. Approcci psicologici all'identità religiosa in una società pluralista (pp. 243–252). Turin: Centro Scientifico Editore.
- Hood, R. W., Jr., Spilka, B., Hunsberger, B., & Gorsuch, R. (1996). Italian trans. Psicologia della religione. Prospettive psicosociali ed empiriche. Turin: Centro Scientifico Editore, 2001.
- Introvigne, Massimo. Il lavaggio del cervello: realtà o mito?, Elledici, Leumann, 2002.
- Di Fiorino, M. (1990). La persuasione socialmente accettata, il plagio e il lavaggio del cervello, Psichiatria e Territorio vol. I.
- Vittorio Giorgini, Le religioni plagiano. «Lettera agli intellettuali», Sacco, 2007. ISBN 88-89584-60-2.

=== The Braibanti case ===
- Anonymous, La sentenza Braibanti, De Donato, Bari 1969. Examination of the affair from an innocence perspective.
- Alberto Moravia, Umberto Eco, Adolfo Gatti, Mario Gozzano, Cesare Musatti, Ginevra Bompiani, Sotto il nome di plagio, Bompiani, Milan 1969. Political interventions by Italian intellectuals in favour of Braibanti.
- Gabriele Ferluga, Il processo Braibanti, Silvio Zamorani Editore, Turin 2003, ISBN 88-7158-116-4. Monograph on the Braibanti case, re-examining it from a historical-political perspective.
- Finzi Ghisi, Virginia. Il caso Braibanti ovvero un processo di famiglia. Libreria Feltrinelli, Milan, 1968.
- Il processo Braibanti — the most complete site available online, with pages devoted to the protagonists and a small press review.
- Felix Cossolo, Il caso Aldo Braibanti, Lambda (journal), 1979.
- Sotto il nome di plagio: il processo Braibanti. Interview with Gabriele Ferluga.
- Il caso Braibanti: nel nome del plagio, trial of homosexuality, by Maria Serena Palieri.
