= Satanism: A Social History =

2016 book by Massimo Introvigne

- Cover of the first edition
- Author: Massimo Introvigne
- Language: English
- Series: Aries
- Subject: Satanism
- Publisher: Brill
- Publication date: 2016
- Publication place: Leiden; Boston
- Media type: Print (hardcover)
- Pages: 655
- ISBN: 978-90-04-28828-7
- OCLC: 945029607
- Dewey Decimal: 133.42209
- LC Class: BF1548 .I58 2016

Satanism: A Social History is a book by the Italian sociologist of religion Massimo Introvigne. It was published by Brill Publishers in 2016, the 21st entry in their Aries book series on western esotericism. It gives a history of Satanism and the ideas surrounding it, ranging from pre-19th-century "proto-Satanism" to the modern day. As a "social history", it aims to cover both the ideas of Satanism and the ideas around Satanism, particularly anti-Satanism.

It is partially adapted from some of Introvigne's previous books on Satanism, including his 1994 monograph Indagine sul Satanismo, and its 1997 French translation Enquête sur le satanisme. The book is expanded and adapted from the previous works. Primarily presented in chronological order, it is split into three parts, focusing on, respectively, the proto-Satanism of the 17th and 18th centuries, "Classical Satanism", and "Contemporary Satanism" from 1952 to the present day.

Introvigne differentiates between occult, rationalist, and folk Satanism; occult satanism being ritual usage of Satan, rationalist satanism political or aesthetic use of his image, and folk satanism as a simplified satanism apparent among some criminal organizations and adolescents. In addition to Satanism, anti-Satanism is a major focus of the book. He argues that the history of Satanism follows a "three-stage pendulum model", with an interplay between the rise of Satanism, society's negative reaction to it, and then a later revival.

Satanism: A Social History received positive reviews and was regarded by several reviewers as one of the best books on modern Satanism. The book received praise for its research and comprehensiveness, particularly in the realm of modern Satanism, and its improvements upon Introvigne's previous books on the subject. Some criticisms were directed at the lack of images, its prose quality, and its definition of Satanism.

== Background and publication history ==
The book's author, Massimo Introvigne, is an Italian scholar of sociology of religion; he taught at Pontifical Salesian University in Turin. Also a copyright lawyer, he later trained as a sociologist. He has authored a number of books and was the founder of the religious research institute CESNUR. Introvigne is a practicing Catholic. Scholar Per Faxneld described him as "among the founding fathers of the field of Satanism studies", and an influential figure in the studies of new religious movements. Asbjørn Dyrendal identified him as one of the earliest academic researchers of Satanism.

Introvigne had spent several decades researching Satanism; he began collecting materials on Satanism in 1973, and amassed a large research collection on the subject. In 1994, Introvigne authored an Italian-language monograph on Satanism, Indagine sul Satanismo. It was translated into French in 1997 as Enquête sur le satanisme; scholar David Frankfurter argued this previous book "set a standard for authoritative history and typology of Satanisms". However, its impact on scholarship was somewhat limited by it not appearing in the English language. Introvigne also published Il Satanismo in 1997. It also includes parts of his 2010 book I satanisti. Storia, miti e riti del satanismo, translated by Introvigne and Tancredi Marrone.

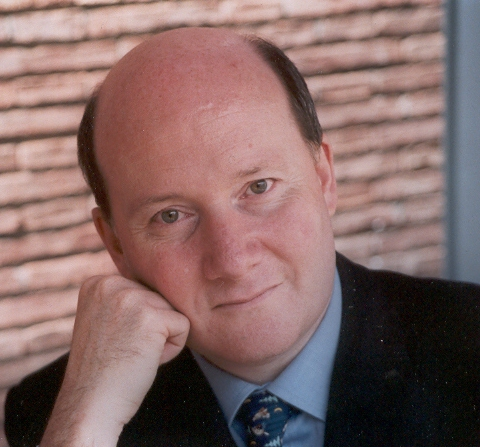
Massimo Introvigne, the book's author, pictured in 2006

Satanism: A Social History was published by Brill Publishers in 2016, the 21st entry in their Aries book series on western esotericism. The 2016 print edition was hardcover and 655 pages long. Counting blank pages, several reviewers noted it is 666 pages long. This may have been an intentional reference to the Satanic "number of the beast". In a review of Ruben van Luijk's Children of Lucifer: The Origins of Modern Religious Satanism, a book published the same year, Introvigne said the number of pages was actually 665. The number of chapters, 13, may have been intentional. The cover is taken from a Baphomet woodblock by Jandro Montero and Tessa Harrison.

The book's publication followed a large expansion in scholarly studies of Satanism in the previous decade. To some degree it is a revision/translation of the 1994 volume, incorporating some of the same content, but it is expanded and altered to the degree where it largely constitutes a different work. However, the structuring is largely similar. Satanism: A Social History is the first English-language appearance of the material.

== Contents ==
In an Introduction, Introvigne gives a history of his involvement with the study of Satanism. He defines satanism as "(1) the worship of the character identified with the name of Satan or Lucifer in the Bible, (2) by organized groups with at least a minimal organization and hierarchy, (3) through ritual or liturgical practices. He considers Satanism and Luciferianism to be synonyms. He defines the book as "a social history of Satanism, a conversation between history and sociology", though the book is primarily a historical study. As a "social history", Satanism: A Social History aims to cover both the ideas of Satanism and the ideas around Satanism, particularly anti-Satanism and what society considers to be Satanic.

In his typology of Satanism, Introvigne, differentiates "occult satanism" from "rationalist satanism" and "folk satanism". He defines occult satanism being done through ritualistic practices done to worship the actual figure of Satan. Rationalist satanism, as he defines it, instead is the usage of Satan for political, artistic, or literary purposes. In contrast to both of these, "folk satanism" is a kind of simplified satanism apparent in some criminal groups and among certain adolescents. Introvigne argues that the history of Satanism follows a "three-stage pendulum model", with three phrases: the emergence of Satanism out of fringe religious movements, then a reaction against Satanism from mainstream society, which then falls apart due to illogical/unsustainable claims (e.g. the Satanic panic), out of which Satanism reemerges. The interplay between anti-Satanism and Satanism is heavily discussed.

Following the introduction, the book is split into 3 parts, each subdivided into chapters: "Proto-Satanism, 17th and 18th Centuries", "Classical Satanism, 1821–1952", "Contemporary Satanism, 1952–2016". There are 13 chapters total. The chapters are also subdivided into further theme sections. The materials in the book are largely ordered chronologically. Introvigne argues that Satanism "proper" only appeared frequently beginning in the late 20th century but that it had precursors in a variety of currents. The first section focuses on what Introvigne terms "Proto-Satanism", currents that led up to the development of recognizable Satanism. Proto-Satanism in France, Sweden, Italy, England, and Russia are all discussed, with a particular emphasis on France. Introvigne writes about the possession trials, Witches' Sabbaths, and "Black Masses" in the court of Louis XIV.

A Baphomet sigil, one of the major symbols of the Church of Satan, which Introvigne identifies as one of the most influential Satanic groups

"Classical Satanism, 1821–1952", the second part, begins with a discussion of anti-Satanism as it related to contemporary Satanic figures of the time. He discusses Éliphas Lévi and his depictions of Baphomet, and Henri Antoine Jules-Bois's ideas of Satan, among other figures. A chapter is devoted to Léo Taxil, a French writer whose hoax writings againstr Satanism caused immense controversy. He follows this with a discussion of the "Satanic Underground" in the world of occultism following the Taxil hoax. Introvigne identifies Classical Satanism's end with the relationship of L. Ron Hubbard and Jack Parsons and their involvement in the Ordo Templi Orientis.

The third section "Contemporary Satanism, 1952–2016" is the largest part, making up about half of the book. Introvigne identifies Anton LaVey, the founder of the Church of Satan, as responsible for almost all contemporary Satanism, if not solely through his actions then by the variety of schisms he inspired and the organizations he influenced, including the Temple of Set, the Society of the Dark Lily, the Order of Nine Angles, The Order of the Left Hand Path, and Joy of Satan Ministries, all of which have a variety of interpretations of the figure of Satan. He covers the Satanic panic, allegations of Satanic Ritual Abuse, backlash against supposedly Satanic rock music, and their impact. The relationship between Satanism and Black metal is analyzed. The final chapter is devoted to the post-1994 period up until 2016, following new developments in the history of Satanism after the Satanic panic. Introvigne theorizes of the future of Satanism that it will remain small, but will not disappear in coming decades, alongside anti-Satanism.

Then follows a 61-page selected bibliography section, from both Satanic and anti-Satanic primary sources, as well as academic research. Following are two indexes, one of names, and one of groups and organizations.

== Reception ==
Swedish religious historian Per Faxneld wrote in 2017 that Satanism: A Social History was "the best, most detailed, and broadest overview of Satanism produced thus far", with scholarship that "cannot be faulted at any point"; he wrote that it was "destined to become a key reference work not only in the study of Satanism but also in the broader fields of new religions and Western esotericism". Scholar of new religions Asbjørn Dyrendal considered it a "magisterial overview", saying that "you will not find anyone mastering and explaining the material better". Religious studies scholar Eugene V. Gallagher similarly considered it "an essential reference work for anyone interested in Satanism" and many related topics. Steven Foertsch wrote in 2022 that it was one of the best recent secondary sources on the history of modern Satanism, while C. H. Lippy, writing for Choice magazine, highly recommended Satanism: A Social History to those interested in new religious movements and the occult. In a 2023 survey of writings on Satanism, Faxneld and Johan Nilsson identified it as among the "best and most comprehensive broad histories of Satanism in history".

Its broad scope and comprehensiveness were complimented by reviewers. Lippy found it more useful as a reference work than as a critical study due to its broad scope, noting it as providing "an encyclopedic summary of virtually every writing about Satanism and every group associated with it in Western Europe and the US from the later 17th century to the present". Gallagher wrote that if a Satanic movement "has left even minimal traces of its existence" it would likely be covered in the book. Introvigne's research was praised, particularly in its usage of a wide range of obscure and hard to find sourcing in the realm of Satanic literature, as was its engagement with existing scholarship. Faxneld wrote that "Introvigne has left no academic stone unturned" in searching for existing academic scholarship, "creat[ing] a synthesis that critically engages with all sides of the major academic debates concerning the phenomenon", in addition to drawing on sources not previously utilized by scholars and presenting new information. Scholar of religion Moshe Sluhovsky found it to be a good history and survey of Satanism, but found its title misleading in that it was not actually "socio-historial", merely historical.

In particular, its coverage of modern Satanism was praised. Sluhovsky wrote that it has a "systematic and detailed description of the different cults, theologies, and the merely weird beliefs" of modern Satanism. Gallagher complimented its analysis, while Sluhovsky said the book did not answer many of the questions it raised, and was primarily a survey rather than an analysis. Dyrendal found it more of a starting point if one wanted to look at Satanism from a theoretical or explanatory perspective, but that the "empirical richness of this book would make an all but impossible task to frame everything in theoretical debates"; he believed that this book would allow studies of Satanism to advance to a more theoretical understanding. Eileen Barker called it "a work with a truly fascinating collection of absorbing stories" as well as a "skilful, and oft-times playful, blending of theoretical analysis and understanding of both the foibles and the extraordinary reaches of the human imagination." In 2026, writer Spencer Sunshine, in a piece on neo-Nazi Satanism, praised the book as one of the few works that did not whitewash the connections between neo-Nazism and Satanism. He described it as "easily the best academic book addressing Nazi-Satanism in over a decade", even though it only made up a small part of the book.

In comparison to Introvigne's previous books on Satanism, reviewers praised its expansions and updates. Faxneld considered it basically a new book, "superior in every way, and up to date in all respects". Jérôme Rousse-Lacordaire said it was not a translation, continuing the research further and containing very different content, with far more research materials. Rousse-Lacordaire praised it for its focus on the mutual relationship between Satanism and anti-Satanism, the two movements feeding off of one another. It was discussed alongside other books on Satanism published the same year, like Ruben van Luijk's Children of Lucifer: The Origins of Modern Religious Satanism and Dyrendal et al.'s The Invention of Satanism. Comparing the two, Gallagher wrote that what Dyrendal et al. "covers in twenty pages, this book devotes more than 250 pages". Faxneld wrote that van Lujik's was somewhat better at portraying pre-20th century Satanism, while Introvigne portrayed modern Satanism better.

There was a mixed reception to the prose and writing quality. Several reviewers found it to be obvious that Introvigne was not a native speaker of the English language. The Fortean Times review called it "leaden" and "lacklustre". Faxneld praised its writing as clear, but suggested that Brill should have copy-edited the book for flow. Ethan Doyle White said there were numerous prose errors, but it was otherwise well-written. Dyrendal complimented the prose as "sober", and found the book to be "highly entertaining", scholarly achievement aside. Scholar Matouš Mokrý praised the writing, considering it readable and at times humorous. Mokrý criticized the uneven length of the chapters, with chapters varying in length from 2 to over 60 pages; he theorized that the chapter structure was in order to have the number of chapters be 13. Faxneld wrote that if he had any substantial criticism, it was the definition of Satanism, finding its exclusion of solitary individuals or more loosely organized groups to be unhelpful, or its exclusion of non-ritualistic atheistic satanists. Sluhovsky criticized the book for defining Satanism exclusively in reference to modern Satanism, "skim[ming] over the first 1,800 years of European combat against Satan". Mokrý also criticized the definition of Satanism and its inconsistent application, but considered it suitable for the book's purposes.

Several reviewers criticized the price of the book. It sold for 255 dollars, expensive even for an academic book. Faxneld wrote that the price was unreasonable, and further that the actual print and binding quality were poor in comparison to older Brill books; he wrote that the book "deserves better". White found the price to be "exorbitant" and criticized it for limiting the book's readership. Several commentators critiqued the lack of images. Eric Hoffman writing for Fortean Times criticized the lack of illustrations, especially given the book's high price.
