= Amadei =

Amadei is an Italian surname. Notable people with the surname include:

- Amedeo Amadei (1921–2013), Italian footballer
- Bernard Amadei (born 1954), French-born engineer
- Emilio Amadei (1867–19??), Italian painter
- Filippo Amadei, also known as Pippo del Violoncello, Italian composer
- Leonetto Amadei (1911–1997), Italian lawyer and a politician
- Magali Amadei (born 1974), French fashion model
- Roberto Amadei (1933–2009), bishop of Bergamo
- Stefano Amadei (1580–1644), Italian painter
