= Berzano =

Berzano may refer to:

== Places ==
- Berzano di San Pietro, comune in the Province of Asti
- Berzano di Tortona, comune in the Province of Alessandria

== People ==
- Luigi Berzano (born 1939), Italian sociologist and Catholic priest
