= Marco Bergamo =

Marco Bergamo may refer to:

- Marco Bergamo (cyclist) (born 1964), Italian cyclist
- Marco Bergamo (serial killer) (1966–2017), Italian serial killer known as The Monster of Bolzano
