= Sollicciano Prison =

Prison in Florence, Italy

- Interactive map of Sollicciano Prison
- Location: Via Girolamo Minervini 2/R, Florence, Italy; 43.7688°N 11.1723°E
- Status: Operational
- Security class: Casa circondariale
- Capacity: 493
- Population: 518 (4 November 2026)
- Opened: 1983
- Managed by: Ministry of Justice
- Governor: Valeria Vitrani (acting)

Sollicciano Prison (Italian: Carcere di Sollicciano) is a prison in Florence, Tuscany, Italy. It stands on the western outskirts of the city, on the border with Scandicci, and was built in 1983. Its plan was meant to recall the lily, which is the symbol of Florence.

The prison is overcrowded and its buildings are in poor condition. In June 2026 a Florence judge ordered the seizure of seven of its sections because of their hygiene and safety conditions. It was the first time that an Italian prison had been placed under seizure.

== History and design ==
Sollicciano replaced the old prison of the Murate. It was designed in 1973 by the architects Andrea Mariotti, Gilberto Campani, Piero Inghirami, Italo Castore, Pierluigi Rizzi and Enzo Camici. Their project won one of the last open competitions for a prison and was inspired by the ideas behind the 1975 reform of the Italian prison system. Construction lasted from 1976 to 1982, and the prison was handed over the following year.

The plan follows a layout in which a central spine links the different activities of the prison. The complex covers about 15 hectares, of which 2.5 are built on.

== Garden of Encounters ==
The Giardino degli Incontri ("Garden of Encounters") is a space inside the prison for meetings between inmates and their families. It was the last project of the architect Giovanni Michelucci, who designed it together with some inmates. The garden opened in 2007.

== Overcrowding and unrest ==
In the months before July 2024 inmates had complained to prosecutors about bed bugs and the lack of water. On 4 July 2024 a 20-year-old inmate died by suicide, the 50th suicide in an Italian prison that year. His death set off a protest in which inmates set fire to mattresses. The water used by firefighters flooded entire sections, and about sixty inmates were moved to other prisons.

In January 2025, after another suicide in the prison on 3 January, the mayor of Florence Sara Funaro said that its conditions were inhuman and that the only solution was to demolish and rebuild it.

== 2026 seizure ==
In June 2026 judge Alessandro Moneti, at the request of the Florence prosecutor's office, ordered the seizure of seven sections of the prison: sections 1, 2 and 7 of the men's judicial wing, sections 9, 10 and 12 of the men's penal wing and the reception section. More than 200 inmates were to be moved to other prisons.

Alessio Scandurra of the prisoners' rights association Antigone said that he had seen water infiltration everywhere and cells that looked painted black with mould. Tuscany's ombudsman for prisoners, Giuseppe Fanfani, said that in fifty years as a lawyer he had never seen a seizure of this kind. The justice minister Carlo Nordio told the Senate that the situation had built up over decades and that the prison would be reduced or even emptied as soon as places became available.

The Ministry of Justice and the prison administration appealed. On 10 July 2026 the review court in Florence confirmed the seizure and found that the rules on health and safety at work also apply to prison areas where staff and inmates work. It annulled the part of the order that set deadlines for the transfers, leaving those decisions to the prison administration.

== Council of Europe report ==
In a report on its visit of September 2025, the Council of Europe's European Committee for the Prevention of Torture (CPT) said that Sollicciano was not fit for purpose. It described very serious structural problems caused by constant water infiltration, with mould on the walls and falling ceilings, and asked the special commissioner for prison buildings to carry out a cost-benefit analysis on the future of the prison. In its reply the Italian government said that extraordinary maintenance work was under way and was expected to be completed by 2030.

== Population and staff ==
According to the Ministry of Justice, on 4 November 2026 the prison held 518 inmates. Its official capacity was 493 places, 213 of which were not available. At the end of September 2026 its staff included 409 officers of the prison police, out of 510 planned.
