= CESNUR =

Religious studies organization

- Center for Studies on New Religions
- Centro Studi sulle Nuove Religioni
- Founded: 1988
- Founder: Massimo Introvigne, Jean-François Mayer, Ernesto Zucchini
- Type: Public non-profit
- Headquarters: Turin, Italy
- Services: Academic study of new religious movements
- Director: Massimo Introvigne
- Website: cesnur.org

The Center for Studies on New Religions (Centro Studi sulle Nuove Religioni), otherwise abbreviated as CESNUR, is a nonprofit organization based in Turin, Italy, that focuses on the academic study of new religious movements. It was established in 1988 by Massimo Introvigne, Jean-François Mayer, and Ernesto Zucchini.

In 2001, Stephen A. Kent described CESNUR as "the highest profile lobbying and information group for controversial religions". The organization is described by the cult research website Apologetics Index as an apologist for cults. CESNUR's scholars have defended such diverse groups as the Unification Church, the Church of Scientology, and Shincheonji Church of Jesus, accused of having aided the spread of the COVID-19 pandemic in South Korea.

CESNUR describes itself as an independent scholarly organization, but the organization has met with criticism for alleged personal and financial ties to the groups it studies; anthropologist Richard Singelenberg questioned in 1997 whether CESNUR is "too friendly and does not make enough critical comments about new religious movements and sects".

CESNUR publishes The Journal of CESNUR, focusing on the academic study of new religious movements, and Bitter Winter, a daily magazine on religious issues and human rights in China.

== History ==
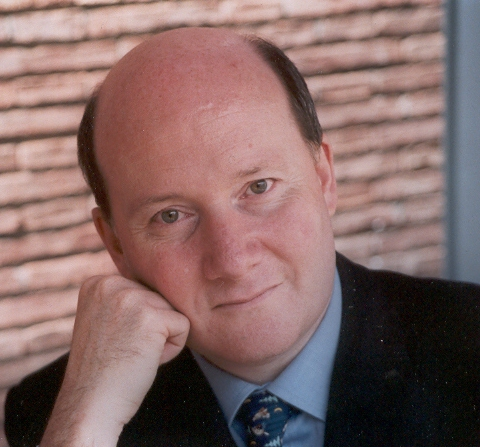
CESNUR founder Massimo Introvigne in 2006

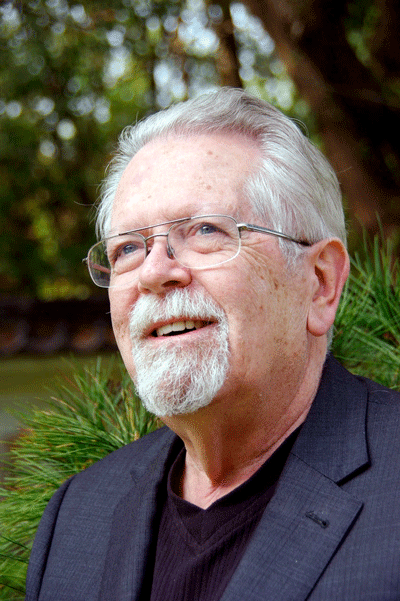
CESNUR board member J. Gordon Melton in 2017

CESNUR was founded in 1988 at a seminar organized by Massimo Introvigne, Jean-François Mayer, and Ernesto Zucchini in Italy. Introvigne is an Italian intellectual-property attorney and sociology lecturer who also serves as the group's director. A member of the Catholic conservative organization Alleanza Cattolica since 1972, Introvigne served as that group's vice president until 2016. Zucchini is a Catholic priest, who became in 2009 professor of theology in the Theological School of the Diocese of Massa Carrara-Pontremoli in Italy and published and lectured about the Italian mystic Maria Valtorta and about the Jehovah's Witnesses.

Giuseppe Casale, a Catholic historian and Archbishop of the Archdiocese of Foggia-Bovino, was appointed as the first president of CESNUR. Later, Luigi Berzano became CESNUR's president. Reviewing the proceedings of one of the first CESNUR conferences, French sociologist Jean Séguy wrote in 1988 that most participants were Catholic and presented the traditional Catholic view of phenomena such as Spiritualism and the New Age. Other members of CESNUR's board include Luigi Berzano, Gianni Ambrosio, Reender Kranenborg, Eileen Barker and J. Gordon Melton. Berzano later became CESNUR's president.

=== "To Put an End to the Sects" book ===
In 1995 the French Parliamentary Commission on Cults in France, after the events of the Order of the Solar Temple, published a critical report on cults. This was followed by similar reports by other governments. CESNUR claimed these texts relied excessively on information supplied by the anti-cult movement and criticized them publicly, particularly through a book called Pour en finir avec les sectes. Canadian scholar Susan Jean Palmer wrote that the title, translated as "To Put an End to the Sects", had a double meaning and was "deliberately misleading", as, rather than to sects of cults, the authors wanted to put an end to governmental criticism of them.

French sociologists Jean-Louis Schlegel and Nathalie Luca reviewed the book critically, noting that while the authors were right in criticizing some mistakes of the Parliamentary report, CESNUR had moved with the volume from a scholarly to a militant advocacy position and to a one-sided defense of cults.

According to Palmer, the book upset the French authorities so much so that one of its co-authors, French historian Antoine Faivre, was placed by the police under temporary arrest (garde à vue), accused of having disclosed confidential details about the persons interviewed by the Parliamentary Commission, although he was detained for a few hours only and a judge later dropped the charges.

=== Scholars and medias ===
In a 1996 piece in Charlie Hebdo, French essayist Renaud Marhic accused CESNUR of being "a scientific screen used to relay [Introvigne's] theses to the complacent media". Scholars Stephen A. Kent and Raffaella Di Marzio have argued that CESNUR's representation of the brainwashing controversy is one-sided, polemical and sometimes without scholarly value, while anthropologist Richard Singelenberg questioned in 1997 whether CESNUR is "too friendly and does not make enough critical comments about new religious movements and sects". Kent further observed: "Many German and French officials working on issues related to religious 'sects' and human rights do not see CESNUR and Introvigne as neutral parties in the ongoing debates... Consequently, other people and organizations have damaged their reputations (rightly or wrongly) among these officials by associating too closely with CESNUR", writing that they were "a think-tank and lobbying group, attempting to advance Scientology’s legitimation goals by influencing European and American governmental policies toward it. It is not a neutral academic association". According to Kent, "many scholars, however, see both CESNUR and INFORM in a favourable light, and they share its criticism of the 'sect-monitors' in France, Germany, and Belgium." The Christian apologetics website Apologetics Index regards them as an apologist for cults.

CESNUR again met with controversy when one of the scheduled speakers at the 1997 CESNUR conference, who was to present scholarship on the religious group New Acropolis, was discovered to be a member of the very group she purported to study. Michiel Louter writing for Dutch magazine De Groene Amsterdammer opined: "It is difficult to believe that CESNUR-director Introvigne was not up-to-date on her membership in the group". The participation of the New Acropolis speaker to the conference was canceled after the connection was publicly reported by Dutch publication Trouw.

In 2001, French journalist Serge Garde accused CESNUR of "systematic interventions in favor of sects brought to justice", naming Jehovah's Witnesses, Scientology, the Unification Church and Aum Shinrikyo and opined that "all the sects know they can count on CESNUR".

=== Eastern Lightning and the murder of Wu Shuoyan ===
Introvigne discussed in Bitter Winter the 2014 murder of Wu Shuoyan, attributed by Chinese authorities to Eastern Lightning. He supported the position first presented in articles of the Chinese daily The Beijing News in 2014, then advocated in 2015 by Australian scholar Emily Dunn, that the perpetrators were not members of Eastern Lightning at the time of the murder. This position was described in 2020 by reporter Donald Kirk as common among scholars. However, while Dunn wrote that the two leaders of the group that committed the murder "started out as members of Eastern Lightning (in 1998 and 2007 respectively), [but] they had outgrown it" and were no longer part of the sect in 2014. Introvigne, based on a different interpretation of the same Chinese sources quoted by Dunn, argued, both in Bitter Winter and in his 2020 book Inside The Church of Almighty God, that they had never been members of Eastern Lightning.

In 2019, CESNUR's Bitter Winter co-hosted in Seoul with Human Rights Without Frontiers a conference supporting the right of asylum of Eastern Lightning and Uyghur refugees from China living in South Korea. Members of Eastern Lightning and the Uyghur diaspora also spoke in the conference.

=== Shincheonji and spread of COVID-19 ===
On November 29, 2019, CESNUR co-organized a seminar in Seoul claiming that thousands of members of Shincheonji, a group many in South Korea regard as a cult, had been subject to forcible deprogramming. Introvigne was among the speakers.

Regarding the Shincheonji organization's association with a coronavirus outbreak in 2020, CESNUR and Human Rights Without Frontiers released a joint white paper stating that, although Shincheonji made "mistakes" in its management of the crisis, the organization had also been discriminated against because of its unpopular status. The founder of Shincheonji had been prosecuted for his alleged responsibility in the spreading of the Covid, and has been acquitted on January 13, 2021.

== Organization ==
According to its official website, CESNUR "is a network of independent but related organizations of scholars in various countries, devoted to promote scholarly research in the field of new religious consciousness, to spread reliable and responsible information, and to expose the very real problems associated with some movements, while at the same time defending everywhere the principles of religious liberty." The Italian authorities recognized CESNUR as a public non-profit organization in 1996 and were contributors to CESNUR projects. Other sources of income include book royalties and member contributions.

While established by a group composed mostly of Catholic scholars, CESNUR is not affiliated with any religious group or denomination and has from the outset included scholars of various religious persuasions. CESNUR is critical of concepts like mind control, thought reform and brainwashing, asserting that they lack scientific and scholarly support and are mainly based on anecdotal evidence.

In a 2018 history of the academic study of new religious movements, American scholar W. Michael Ashcraft described CESNUR as "the largest outlet currently supporting research on NRMs." In 2018, The Korea Times described CESNUR as "the largest international association of scholars specializing in the study of new religious movements."

=== Activities ===
Massimo Introvigne has spoken before the Commission on Security and Cooperation in Europe and the Organization for Security and Co-operation in Europe.

CESNUR actively opposes legislation targeting sects and publicly speaks out against certain anti-sect laws. In France, for example, during the examination of the Picard law in 2001, Massimo Introvigne published a text entitled "France: Assembly Passes Extreme Anti-Cult Law, Making Brainwashing a Crime" and describing the bill as an extremely concerning "anti-cult" law.

In France, CESNUR also published very scathing criticisms of the Interministerial Mission for the Fight Against Sects (MILS).

It also provides expert testimony and witness accounts during trials targeting cult-like organizations. Massimo Introvigne testified on behalf of Scientologists in a criminal trial in Lyon. In 1995, Introvigne argued that Order of the Solar Temple members who died by mass suicide had acted on their own initiative as opposed to being victims of the leader's manipulations. In 1997, Melton appeared as an expert witness on behalf of the Singapore branch of the International Churches of Christ, arguing that the group was not a "cult". The testimony garnered attention for Melton's admission on cross-examination that he had publicly made similar claims about Peoples Temple, responsible for 918 deaths in Jonestown, Guyana.

=== Publications ===
Since 2017, CESNUR has published The Journal of CESNUR, a periodic about new religious movements. CESNUR sponsors yearly conferences in the field of new religions. The 2019 conference at the University of Turin included over 200 attendees. The journal's articles are typically sourced from CESNUR's annual conferences. The journal is open access, and Introvigne is the founder and lead editor. Benjamin E. Zeller noted in 2020 that, while too recently founded to give a proper analysis, the journal's articles tended to disproportionately focus on East Asia.

In 2001 and 2006 CESNUR published two editions of its encyclopedia of religions in Italy.

==== Bitter Winter ====
Bitter Winter was launched in May 2018 as an online magazine which covers religious freedom and human rights in China, and later on in other countries. According to the magazine it is supported by volunteer contributions and is published daily in five languages.

Some of the magazine's correspondents were arrested in late 2018 by the authorities for their work documenting and publicizing antireligious campaigns of the Chinese Communist Party. The United States Department of State in the chapter on China of its 2019 Human Rights Report noted that, among 45 Bitter Winter contributors the magazine reported had been arrested in 2018, in 2019, 4 of the 22 detained in Xinjiang were released, and among the 23 detained in Henan, Fujian, Zhejiang and Shanxi, "several had been released after indoctrination training," while "online media reported that police tortured" those arrested in Fujian.

The same United States Department of State quoted repeatedly Bitter Winter as "an online magazine on religious liberty and human rights in China" in the China section of its 2018 International Religious Freedom Report. The American evangelical magazine World called Bitter Winter "a thorn in the side" of the Chinese Communist Party, and reported that in a secret document "the Chinese government has called Bitter Winter an 'overseas hostile website' [境外敌对网站] and instructed its intelligence agency, the Ministry of State Security, to investigate the group."
