= Willy Fautré =

Director and founder of HRWF

- Citizenship: Belgian
- Organization: Human Rights Without Frontiers International

Willy Fautré is the Belgian founder and director of Human Rights Without Frontiers International (HRWF). He specializes in the issues faced by religious and linguistic minorities in Europe, and has authored articles in academic journals on the relationship between the state and religion.

== Biography ==
Fautré previously served as a chargé de mission in the Belgian Parliament. Through his work at HRWF, Fautré has also contributed to reporting and raising awareness about human rights violations, often interacting with international bodies, such as the United Nations, European Court of Human Rights (HUDOC) to call for stronger actions in defense of human rights worldwide. Willy Fautré has published various analysis related to the relationship between the state and religion in Modern Diplomacy. He also writes as Brussels correspondent for the European Times newspaper.

== Human Rights Without Frontiers ==
Fautré founded Human Rights Without Frontiers International, a non-profit organization based in Brussels, in 2001. It is known for "defending religious communities from persecution and interference by state authorities" and registered in the European Union Transparency Register —which lists organizations engaged in interest representation activities - since 2011.

He has championed the cause of religious and linguistic minorities in Europe at the United Nations, Organization for Security and Co-operation in Europe, European Union Agency for Fundamental Rights, and the European Parliament. He often hosts conferences on religious freedom at the European Parliament and gives lectures on subjects including religious freedom, discrimination, and intolerance.

=== Activities ===
HRWFI is registered as a lobby by the European institutions since 2011. According to Lobby Facts, its lobbying activities cost between 21.000 and 150.000 € per year, from 2011 to 2021. The budget comes from donations from individuals and religious groups.

According to the French outlet Blast in 2024, Willy Fautre is one of Brussels religious lobbyists, protecting "Jehovah’s Witnesses, Ahmadi Muslims, or Russian Orthodox priests from “censorship and persecution”—particularly at the UN or the OSCE, where he leverages his network of contacts." They further said that M. Fautré has been filing a series of lawsuits targeting agencies that combat organizations they consider cults, as well as associations that advocate for victims of undue influence. In a 2001 academic article, Stephen A. Kent compares HRWF to the CESNUR in its agenda, "apparently lobbying on behalf of allegedly controversial 'minority religions.'"

== Writing ==
=== Book chapter ===
- Fautré, W. (2004). "Belgium's Anti-Sect Policy". In Richardson, J. T. (ed.). Regulating Religion. Critical Issues in Social Justice. Springer, Boston, MA. pp. 113–125. doi:10.1007/978-1-4419-9094-5_8. ISBN 978-0-306-47887-1.

=== Articles ===
- Fautré, W. (1999). "Belgium's Anti-Sect War". Social Justice Research. 12 (4): 377–392. doi:10.1023/A:1022025326484.
- Fautré, W. (2020). "Coercive change of religion in South Korea: The case of the Shincheonji church". The Journal of CESNUR. 4 (3): 35–56.
- Fautré, W. (2020). "Opposition to Jehovah's Witnesses in Russia: Legal Measures". The Journal of CESNUR. 4 (6): 41–57.
- Fautré, W. (2024). "Abusive taxation of religious minorities. A comparative study of Tai Ji Men in Taiwan and the Jehovah's Witnesses in France". International Journal for Religious Freedom. 17 (1): 5–11. doi:10.59484/URQV1407. hdl:10520/ejc-ijrf_v17_n1_a4.

== Sources ==
- Besier, Gerhard, ed. (2016-08-17). Jehovah's Witnesses in Europe. Past and Present. Vol. 1. Cambridge Scholars Publishing. ISBN 9781443898515.
- Davis, Derek H.; Miroshnikova, Elena, eds. (2013). The Routledge International Handbook of Religious Education. Routledge International Handbooks of Education. Routledge. ISBN 9781136256417.
- Gordon Melton, J.; Baumann, Martin, eds. (2010-09-21). "About the Editors and Contributors". Religions of the World. A Comprehensive Encyclopedia of Beliefs and Practices (2 ed.). ABC-CLIO. ISBN 9781598842043.
- "Deterioration of Religious Liberty in Europe" (PDF) (Interview). Interviewed by Merry, Wayne. Briefing of the Commission on Security and Cooperation in Europe. 1998-07-22.
- Richardson, James T.; Bellanger, François, eds. (2016). Legal Cases, New Religious Movements, and Minority Faiths. Routledge Inform Series on Minority Religions and Spiritual Movements. Routledge. ISBN 9781317106388.
