= Maria Luisa Figueira =

Portuguese psychiatrist and academic

- Born: 1944 (age 81–82); Portugal
- Education: University of Lisbon
- Scientific career
- Fields: Psychiatry

Maria Luisa Figueira (born 1944) is a Portuguese Consultant psychiatrist, psychiatrist and academic known for her research in clinical and experimental psychopathology and psychopharmacology, particularly in relation to bi-polar disorders and schizophrenia. She is Professor of Psychiatry and Director of the Department of Psychiatry at the University of Lisbon Faculty of Medicine and Head of the Psychiatric Department at the Hospital de Santa Maria in Lisbon.

== Life and career ==
Figueira grew up on the Portuguese island of Madeira. Her father was a lawyer and her mother an Englishwoman born in Gibraltar. After completing her secondary education at the Liceu Nacional in Funchal, she attended the University of Lisbon, receiving her medical degree in 1973. She then worked as an assistant professor in the psychology department of the university's Faculty of Medicine and took post-graduate courses in mathematics and computer science at the Instituto Gulbenkian de Ciência. It was during this time that she began her research into psychopharmacology, working in the Group for Psychopharmacological Studies organized by Manuel Paes de Sous at the Hospital de Santa Maria. On the strength of their research both were admitted to the Collegium Internationale Neuro-Psychopharmacologicum in 1978. Figueira went on to receive her PhD in 1984 with a dissertation on interpersonal behaviour in schizophrenia.

In 2002 she was appointed Coordinator of Mental Health Services at the Hospital de Santa Maria in Lisbon and subsequently became the head of its Psychiatric Department. The following year she co-founded the journal Bridging Eastern and Western Psychiatry with the Italian psychiatrist Mario Di Fiorino. Figueira received the Lifetime Achievement Award from the International Forum of Psychosis and Bipolarity in 2010 and is the President (as of 2013) of the Sociedade Portuguesa de Psiquiatria e Saúde Mental (Portuguese Society of Psychiatry and Mental Health).
