= Gruppo del Rosario =

Italian apocalyptic cult

Gruppo del Rosario (Rosary Prayer Group) was an Italian apocalyptic cult, primarily active from 1973 to 1989, although remnants of the cult existed as late as 2010. In May 1988, 35 of its members, including its then leader, Lidia Naccarato, were arrested following the brutal murder of a fellow member. The sect has been the subject of several studies by the Italian psychiatrist Mario Di Fiorino.
