= Joy of Satan Ministries =

Occult religious organization founded in 2002

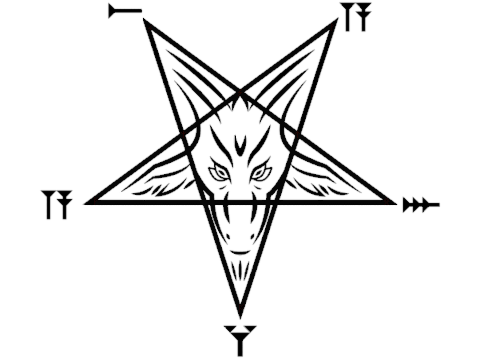
- The sigil of Baphomet adapted by Joy of Satan Ministries, incorporated with cuneiform script reading "Satan".
- Abbreviation: JoSM
- Type: New religious movement (Satanism)
- Classification: Theistic Satanism
- Orientation: Spiritual Satanism
- Scripture: Yazidi Book of Revelation
- Theology: Polytheism
- Structure: Magical order
- Region: International (Mainly USA)
- Founder: Andrea Maxine Dietrich (1962–2020)
- Origin: 2002; 24 years ago
- Tax status: Exempt
- Official Website (archived copy from April 2010)

The Joy of Satan Ministries (JoSM) is an occult religious organization founded in 2002 by Andrea M. Dietrich.

It is a new religious movement and a form of Western esotericism that espouses "Spiritual Satanism", a form of Satanism.

The Joy of Satan Ministries advocates an ideology that presents a synthesis of theistic Satanism, Nazi occultism, Gnosticism, neopaganism, Western esotericism, UFO conspiracy theories, and extraterrestrial beliefs.

Members believe Satan to be "the true father and creator God of humanity", whose desire was for his creations, humanity, to elevate themselves through knowledge and understanding.

== Definition ==
The orientation of the Joy of Satan Ministries is generally acknowledged by religious scholars as a form of Western esotericism, which embraces theistic Satanism with an esoteric perception that contrasts the materialist and carnal inceptions by LaVeyan Satanism. The relationship between practitioners and Satan is described by professor of religious studies, Christopher Partridge, as "the core of an esoteric project of transformation, based on a personal or mystical relationship".

== History ==
=== Inception ===
In the early 2000s, Maxine Dietrich began the creation of the Joy of Satan Ministries. Maxine Dietrich established a Satanic ideology that would present itself as an esoteric form of LaVeyan Satanism, but would espouse a "traditional Satanism" by establishing its satanic fundamentals from ancient Middle East, Far-Eastern and Western teachings, and only acknowledging the Judaic/Abrahamic concept of Satan as a reaction.

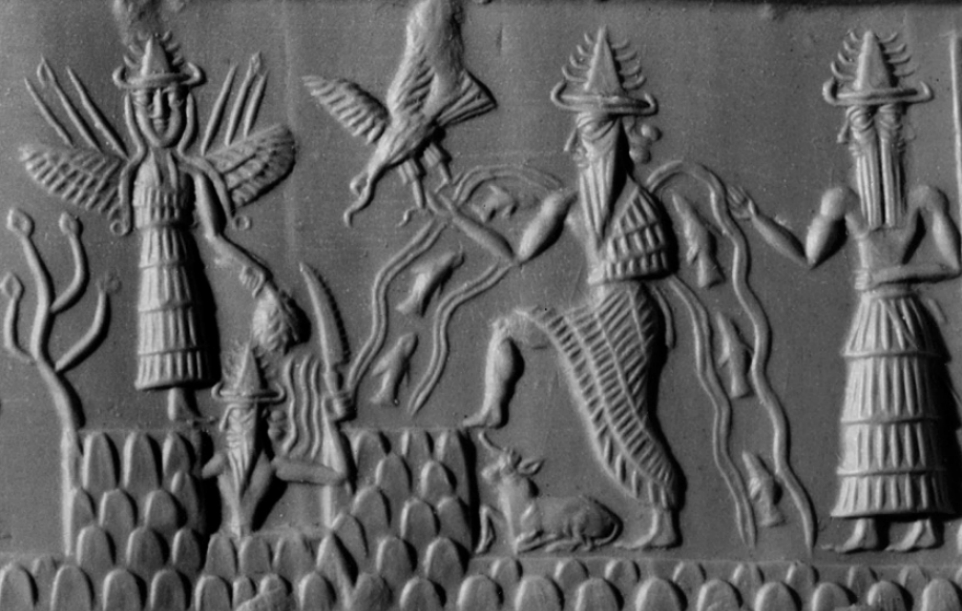
The ancient clay tablets served as a basis for many ancient astronaut theorists. This Adda Seal depicts Ea (Sumerian Enki), god of subterranean waters and of wisdom,Usimu, his vizier (chief minister), the sun god Shamash (Sumerian Utu) at the centre, and the winged goddess Ishtar (Sumerian Inanna) to the left.

=== E.T. revelation ===
At some point during Maxine Dietrich's studies in ancient history, with ancient astronaut theorist Zecharia Sitchin being noted to have some influence, Dietrich derived a theory of an ancient conflict between advanced extraterrestrial races (see #Origins of humanity, below) and incorporated these theories into her ideology; concluding that Jews and the Abrahamic religions were the creations of a hostile alien race responsible for the deposition of pagan religions and their pagan gods (who the JoSM identify as demons). With this reinterpretation, the Joy of Satan Ministries recreated Anton LaVey's Sigil of Baphomet, a Sigil that would incorporate cuneiform script instead of Hebrew letters (which spells out "Satan" in cuneiform instead of "Leviathan" in Hebrew), attributing to the origins of the use of the Pentagram in Sumeria. The introduction of these theories, along with their contempt for Jewish mysticism, sparked significant controversy within the religious organization.

=== NSM incident ===
In 2004, the Joy of Satan Ministries became established as a non-profit religious organization. Anti-Judaic sentiment had also completely established itself within the JoSM ideology. It was also revealed during this time that Clifford Herrington, chairman of the National Socialist Movement, was the husband of the organization's high priestess. This revelation exposed the split in the NSM's supposed "Christian identity" between the Christians, theistic Satanists and Odinists. After the events, they became the topic of significant controversy.

=== Post–Dietrich period ===
Despite its controversies, the Joy of Satan Ministries maintained some degree of popularity and significance among the currents of recent and contemporary theistic Satanism. Some among the theistic Satanist community commended Maxine Dietrich, appraising her pioneering efforts as a "vast improvement over the old, disrespectful grimoire methods" with the introduction of a system of respectful demon invocation.

In March 2019, Angelfire discontinued its web hosting services for the organization.

Since Maxine Dietrich's death in 2020, the organization has been sustained by others and has undergone significant changes.

== Beliefs ==
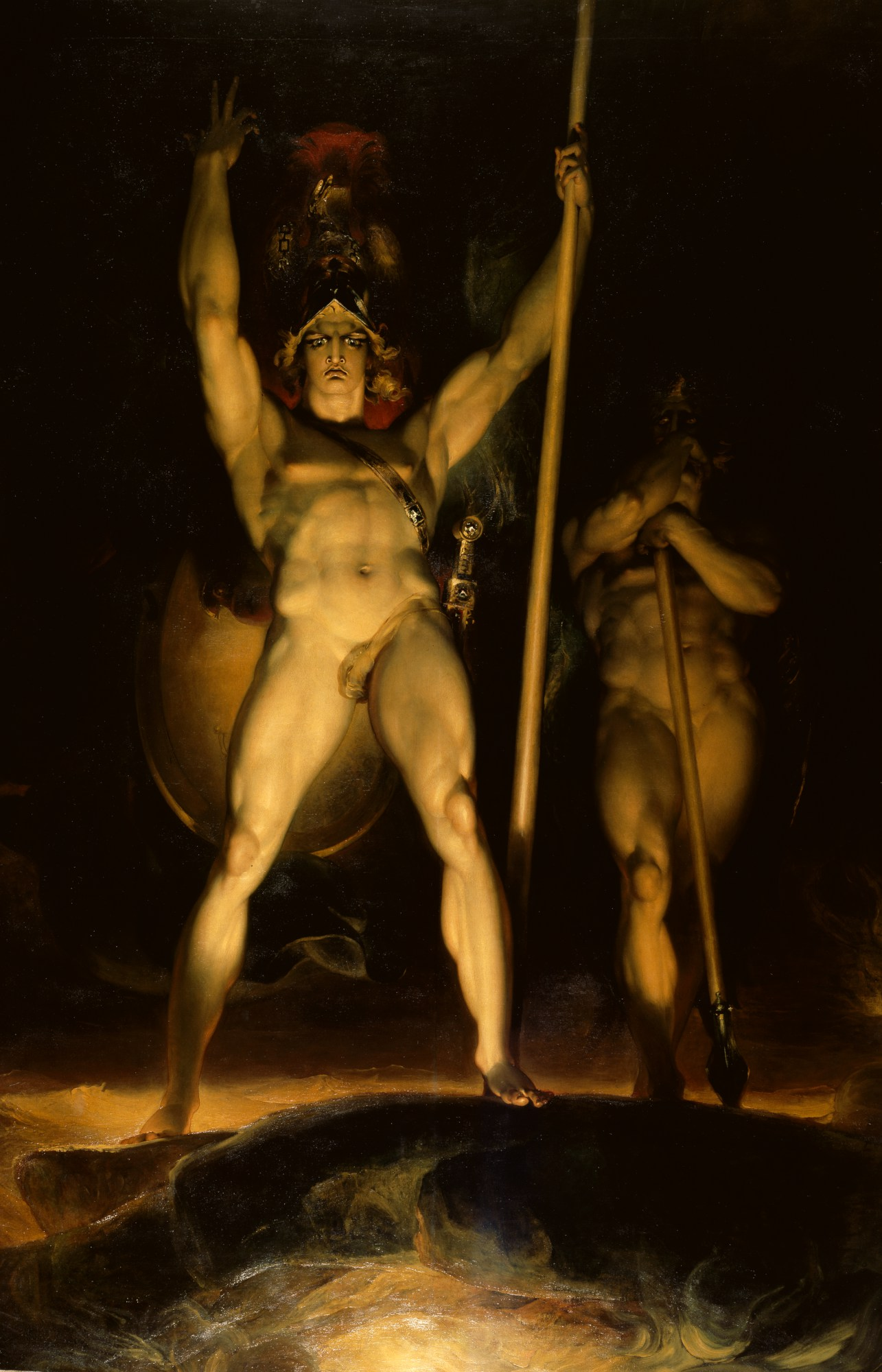
Satan summoning his legions, portrayed by Thomas Lawrence, subject of Milton's ‘Paradise Lost’, Book I, line 330, 'Awake, arise, or be for ever fallen'.

=== Ancient gods ===
According to scholars, Satan and some demons were viewed by the Joy of Satan Ministries as one of many deities which are equated with many gods from ancient cultures, such as Satan having known to be the Sumerian god Enki and the Yazidi angel Melek Taus. While the Joy of Satan Ministries views Satan as a deity, they also consider the deities to be highly evolved, sentient, and powerful humanoid extraterrestrial beings who do not age.

They also hold the belief that Satan represents strength, power, justice, and freedom. Lilith is another deity of significance to the group, who is recognized as "the patron of strong women and a goddess of women's rights".

=== Adaptations and comparisons to LaVey ===
While the Joy of Satan Ministries originally adapted some of the principles from LaVey's Satanic Bible, Introvigne notes that LaVeyan Satanism tends to be more "rationalist" in comparison. The philosophy and religion scholar Asbjorn Dyrendal also describes "a different spiritual atmosphere from LaVeyan Satanism." Whereas LaVey was able to suggest the existence of mysterious, occult forces while simultaneously appealing to an atheist viewpoint, the JoSM tends to use more simplistic, spiritualist language.

=== Revisionist history ===
As noted by sociologist of religion Massimo Introvigne, Maxine Dietrich derived the theory of a mortal struggle between enlightened aliens and a monstrous extraterrestrial race, the Reptilians.

They believe that Satan and the demons of the Goetia are sentient and powerful extraterrestrial beings responsible for the creation of humanity, and whose origins pre-date Abrahamic religions. They're also identified as Nephilim from the Hebrew Bible.

==== Origins of humanity ====
"The books of Jews, Christians and Muslims, as of those who are without, accept in a sense, i.e., so far as they agree with and conform to my statutes. Whatsoever is contrary to these, they have altered; do not accept it. Three things are against me and I hate three things. But those who keep my secrets shall receive the fulfillment of my promises. Those who suffer for my sake I will surely reward in one of the worlds.

It is my desire that all my followers unite in a bond of unity, lest those who are without prevail against them. Now, then, all ye who have followed my commandments and my teachings, reject all the teachings and sayings of such as are without.

I have not taught these teachings, nor do they proceed from me. Do not mention my name nor my attributes, lest ye regret it; for ye do not know what those who are without may do."

— Kitab Al Jilwah (Book of Revelation) Chapter IV

The Joy of Satan Ministries believes that one of the benign aliens, Enki, who they consider to be Satan himself, created, with his collaborators on Earth, human beings through their advanced technology of genetic engineering. They consider that most salient of his creations were the Nordic-Aryan race. They declare that the Reptilians have, in turn, created their own kind by combining their own DNA with the DNA of semi-animal humanoids (also known as neanderthals) which would later become known as the Jewish race.

==== Aftermath of the cosmic war ====
They posit that the peak of hostilities between the extraterrestrial factions led to the benevolent extraterrestrials departing Earth approximately 10,000 years ago, during which the Paleolithic-Neolithic era was a post-apocalyptic period shaped by catastrophic events. Following their departure, they believe the agents of the Reptilians (see Reptilian conspiracy theory) began to establish their own religious systems, the Abrahamic religions. Subsequently, this led to the deposition and defamation of Pagan deities and their followers. A similar formulation is made with the witch-cult hypothesis. They claim these religions maligned the benign extraterrestrials by labelling them as "devils" and malevolent, and through their doctrines, created a climate of terror within humanity (e.g., condemning sexuality), to better program and control humans.

They state that Satan, however, did not abandon humanity, believing to have revealed himself to the Yazidis (a pre-Zoroastrian sect from Northern Iraq), described in The Black Book of Satan (not to be confused with the ONA's scripture of the same name).

== Practices ==
The Joy of Satan Ministries promotes a wide variety of occult practices, including methods for evocation of demonic entities and guidelines for making pacts with them. It asserts that Satanism, in practice, is the true nature of humanity that precedes Christianity and Islam.

=== Occultism ===
The practices of the Joy of Satan Ministries may bear similarities to those of other groups categorized under theistic Satanism and esoteric ideology. As Christian author and biblical researcher Josh Peck notes, "theistic Satanism engages in every New age practice under the sun in their dedications to Satan and Satanic philosophy." As an example, he cites their use of divination methods such as, astrology, magic, pendulums, runes, clairvoyance, past lives, the pineal gland and third eye, the chakras, bioelectric technology, the astral plane, spells, the kundalini serpent, trance, as well as methods in self-hypnosis, incense, telekinesis, brain waves, and chanting.

The scholar of Satanism, Jesper A. Petersen, notes that practitioners who experiment with the meditation practices of the Joy of Satan Ministries may find them useful, and adds that the group's use of magic spans from simple to complex techniques. These include sorcery, spells, and various types of witchcraft, all of which require the practitioner to imaginatively apply specialized knowledge and technique to the object of the spell, hypnotism, healing and other kind of magic or divination. They also offer a range of occult techniques in black magic.

=== Rituals ===
According to Jesper Petersen, "The rituals proposed by the Joy of Satan are very simple and not particularly advanced, with most consisting of mainly visualization exercises rather than actual rituals known in mainstream satanic culture." He adds that, contrary to popular belief, the rituals do not involve negotiation or the exercise of evil; rather, they revolve around telepathic communication with anthropomorphic beings, often accompanied by an almost jovial tone.

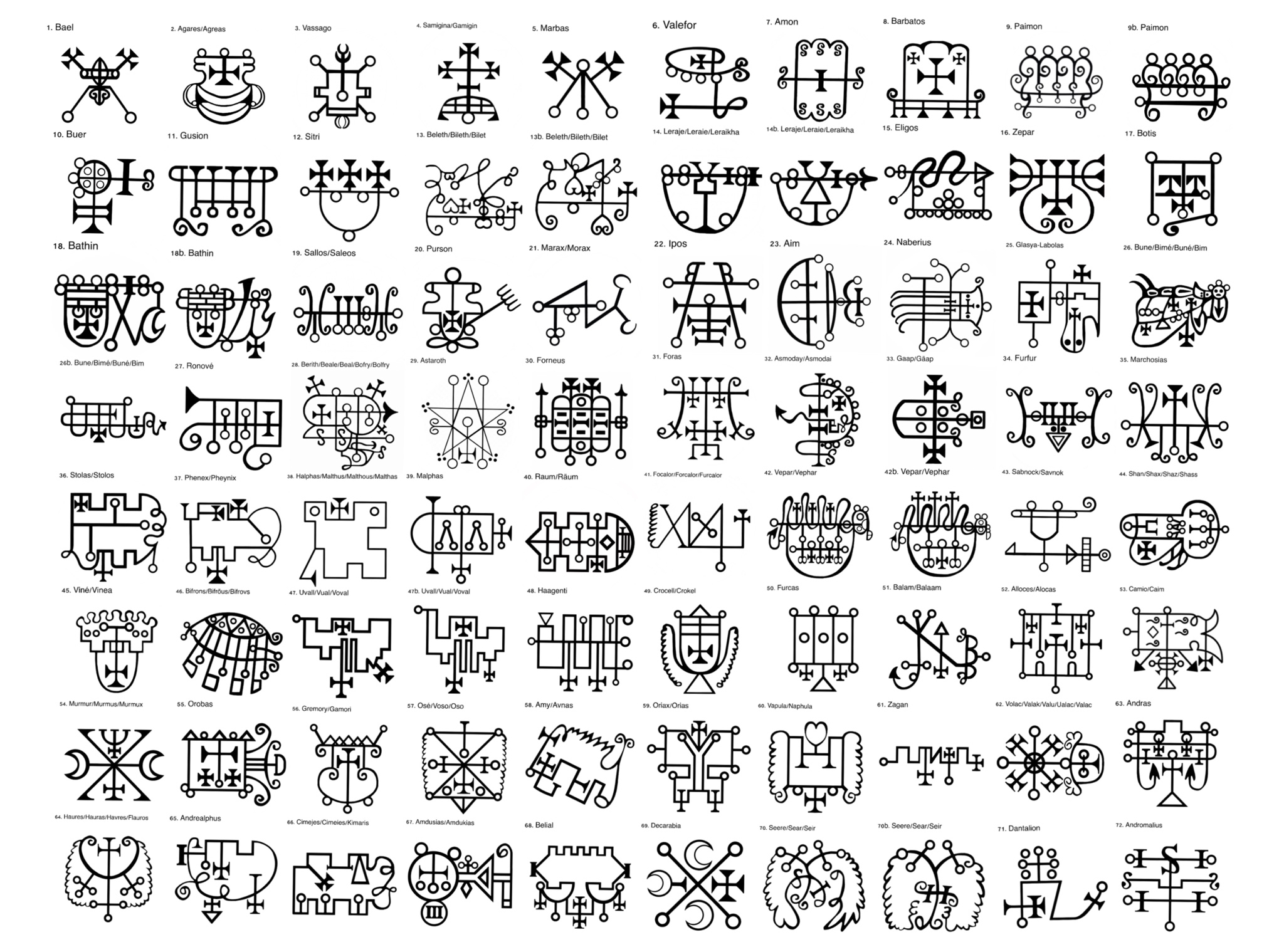
The 72 Goetic Sigils adapted from the Lemegeton, also known as the Lesser Key of Solomon, a 17th-century grimoire. The origins of the Sigils have been debated.

The Joy of Satan Ministries also states that Satan recognizes a lack of funds and does not expect his adherents to have expensive items for ritual in comparison to the ideals of a modern Christian Church. A similar formulation is also used when discussing the scarcity of black candles.

Initiates begin a "formal commitment" that is signed in blood and burned to participate fully in Satan's work upon humanity, to imply a growth in spiritual knowledge and personal power. During standard devotional rituals, the focus of their practice is described as shifting from exerting control to cultivating attachment and self-development. Rather than forcefully summoning demons, these rituals aim to facilitate mystical experiences and empower the practitioners in a way that aligns with their expressive concerns. The central part of their "Standard Ritual to Satan" consists of reading prayers to and "communicating with father Satan one to one", which is considered by Jesper Petersen "a surprising break with the more traditional ceremonial activities known in mainstream satanic culture." The structure of the ritual is also considered fairly standard, after which suitable preparations (bathing, lighting candles, and so on), the ritual begins with ringing the bell and invoking "The four princes of hell." In the main part, the Invocation to Satan is recited, establishing a link suitable for prayer and communication in which the practitioner, after concluding his endeavors, will then end the ritual with a close.

Prominent theistic Satanist, Diane Vera, commends Maxine Dietrich, appraising her pioneering efforts as a "vast improvement over the old, disrespectful grimoire methods." Rev. Jeff Rhoades also states their endeavors with demons are "with much more respect than most version of the Goetia and other Christian grimoires."

Adherents of the Joy of Satan Ministries may also partake in rituals against those believed to be "enemies of Satan", advocated as spiritual warfare.

== Reception ==
Joy of Satan Ministries became the topic of significant criticism for its close connections to a high-ranking leader of the US-based Neo-Nazi National Socialist Movement, as well as for its antisemitic, anti-Judaic, anti-Christian, and anti-Muslim beliefs. While some among the theistic and spiritual Satanist community have adopted their ideas as a model, in some cases they have distanced themselves from the group's controversial beliefs, and "explicit connection with Nazism". According to some religious studies scholars, although the JoSM may appear somewhat similar to the Order of Nine Angles, their ideology and beliefs fundamentally oppose each other.

When the fact that Maxine was the wife of a well-known American neo-Nazi leader became public knowledge, it created serious problems within Joy of Satan Ministries itself. This controversy exposed a split in the NSM between those in the Christian Identity movement and the Odinists and Satanists. According to Introvigne (2016), "Several local groups abandoned Dietrich and started minuscule splinter organisations. Some of these insisted that they were not Satanist, just pagan". Introvigne also added that while most of the Satanic groups were no longer active, JoSM had persisted, albeit with fewer members. Despite the events, Introvigne noted that the group's beliefs in extraterrestrial life, meditation, and telepathic communication with demons had gained popularity among a broader community of non-LaVeyan "spiritual" or theistic Satanists. Followed by a series of backlash, Clifford and Andrea Herrington were also accused of sexual misconduct, which Introvigne claims "are difficult to evaluate"; however, Maxine's Satanic affiliations were enough to result in Clifford Herrington's departure from the National Socialist Movement. Clifford Herrington would then attempt to recreate his own "National Socialist Freedom Movement" after leaving the NSM in 2006.

Scholar of religion, James R. Lewis, noted in his Satan census (2009) a surprising number of respondents to the Joy of Satan Ministries. Additionally, the scholar of Satanism, Jesper A. Petersen, found in his 2014 survey on the Satanic milieu's proliferation on the internet a surprising prominence among theistic Satanist websites on the internet, noting the popularity of the Church of Satan to be somewhat paradoxically with the Joy of Satan Ministries' page base on the Angelfire network.

== See also ==
- Ancient Egyptian religion
- Ancient Mesopotamian religion
- Ancient Greek religion
- Ancient Vedic religion
- Anti-Christian sentiment
- Anti-Islam sentiment
- Demonology
- Esoteric neo-Nazism
- Extraterrestrial hypothesis
- Far-right politics
- Fermi Paradox
- Religions of the ancient Near East
- Spirituality
- Temple of Set
