= Marco Bergamo (serial killer) =

Italian serial killer

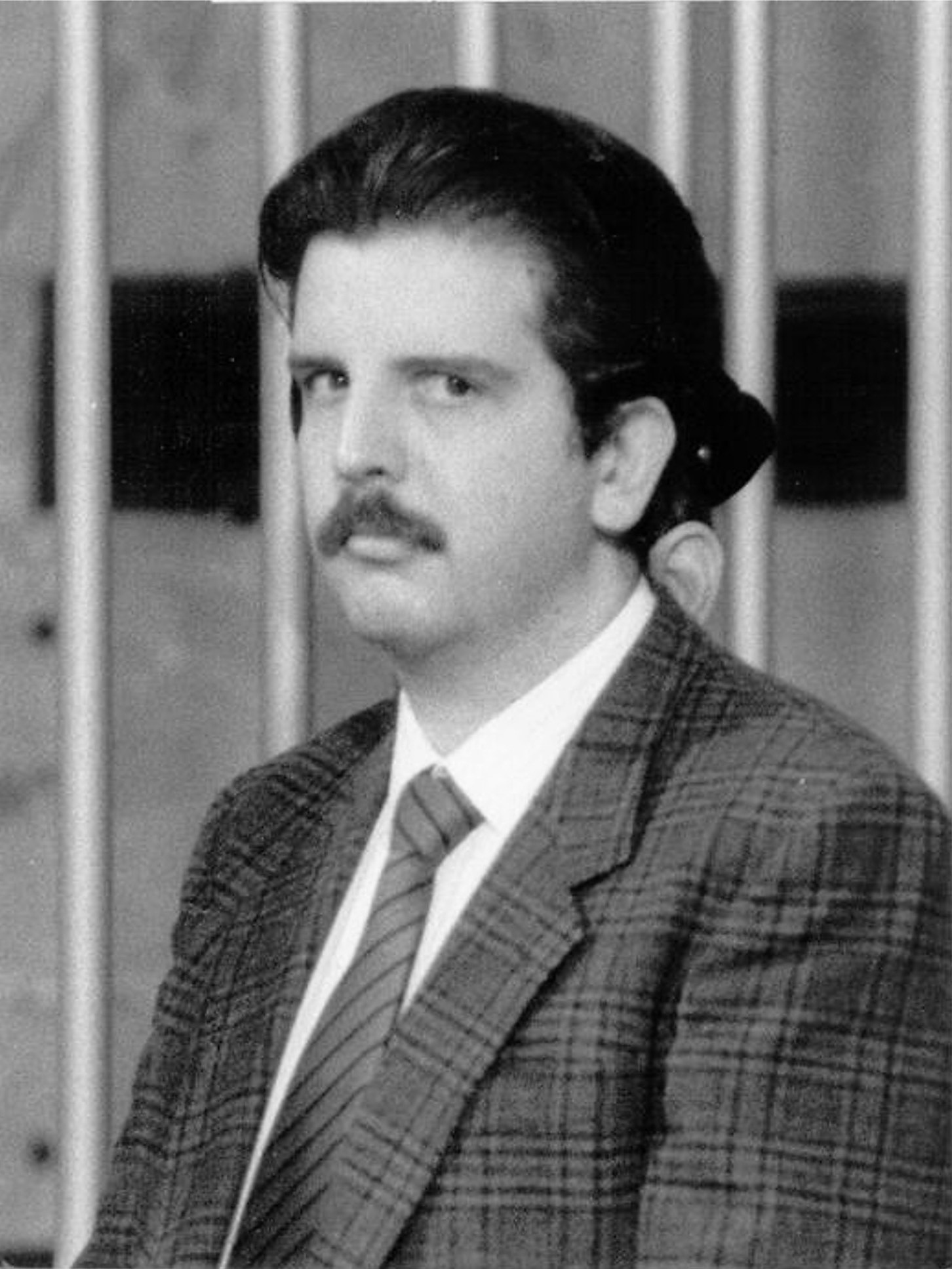
- Born: 6 August 1966; Bolzano, Italy
- Died: 17 October 2017 (aged 51); Bollate, Italy
- Other name: "The Monster of Bolzano"
- Conviction: Murder
- Penalty: Life imprisonment

Details
- Victims: 5
- Span of crimes: 1985–1992
- Country: Italy
- State: Bolzano
- Date apprehended: 6 August 1992

Marco Bergamo (6 August 1966 – 17 October 2017), known as The Monster of Bolzano, was an Italian serial killer who murdered five women between 1985 and 1992.

== Biography ==
Ever since childhood, Bergamo lived with complications: at the age of 4, he stuttered, and later on was obese and suffering from a skin disease, turning him into a shy introvert. He subsequently collected numerous items, including knives — and always carried a knife.

After starting work as a welder and carpenter, at the age of 26, in May 1992, he underwent surgery to remove one of his testicles.

=== Murders ===
Bergamo murdered five women between 1985 and 1992, including a 15-year-old student and four prostitutes, the eldest of whom was 41.

On 3 January 1985, the first victim, Marcella Casagrande, a 15-year-old first-year student of the nearby Magistral Institute, was found dead in her home. Casagrande had been murdered using a knife with which the killer had good knowledge of using, as well as equally good knowledge of human anatomy, as the girl had suffered several stabs of which one reached the tenth vertebra of the vertebral column. She had been held by the hair while the murderer performed the butchering.

Six months later, on 26 June, 41-year-old Anna Maria Cipolletti, a junior high school teacher at "Ugo Foscolo" who was also involved in prostitution, was found near a studio on 149 Brennero Street. She had been stabbed 19 times, and her underwear stolen. In addition, cigarette butts were found on her body as well as used condoms. According to the investigators, there was no sexual violence.

After 7 years, three more prostitutes were murdered in 1992.

On 7 January, 24-year-old Renate Rauch's body was found in a deserted parking lot in the service area of Renon Street in Bolzano. Some days later, flowers were found on her tomb with a note attached: "I'm sorry but what I did, it had to be done and you knew it: bye Renate! Signed MM". The police hypothesized that the double "M" was the name for Marco.

On 21 March, Bergamo murdered 19-year-old Renate Troger, a blond girl from Millan, near Bressanone who, during the night, accepted a lift along Verdi Square in Bolzano. Her body was found near Renon, mutilated and with 14 stab wounds.

On 6 August, he murdered 20-year-old Marika Zorzi, another prostitute from Laives, found with 28 stab wounds at the second bend of the road that leads to Monte Pozza.

== Capture ==
Bergamo was stopped by two police officers after leaving Bolzano at about 6:00 a.m. — shortly after the last murder on 6 August 1992, also his 26th birthday. He claimed to be en route from Volta. The authorities immediately suspected Bergamo. The passenger seat had bloodstains and missing padding; they found a document in the trunk belonging to the last victim; and noted a missing rear-view mirror, later found at the crime scene.

== Trial ==
Bergamo initially only admitted to murdering three of the five victims; he then denied killing the second victim, Anna Maria Cipolletti as well as the fourth, Renate Troger. The court, however, on the basis of the evident affinity with which the crimes were executed, condemned him for the five murders, which were committed by a subject who was sadistic but was also fully aware of his actions. However, no connection could be made to the murder of prostitute Anne Maria Ropele on 8 January 1992, at her home in Trento, nor with that of Florentian tourist Adele Barsi, killed on 20 July 1984, near Bruneck; both murders remain unsolved.

Various theories about Bergamo's personality began to appear in local newspapers: that of a fetishist, an exhibitionist and a consumer of pornographic material with impotence problems. The Court of Assizes of Bolzano entrusted the investigation to four different experts, who came to different conclusions. At first, the Court of Assizes of Bolzano appointed Prof. Introna, director of Forensic Medicine at the University of Padua, who declared Marco Bergamo not liable for mental illness and proposed his interment in a Judicial Psychiatric Hospital. This thesis was supported by the forensic psychiatrist Mario Di Fiorino, appointed by the defence of Marco Bergamo. Later Marco Bergamo followed the fate of Jeffrey Dahmer, believed by "criminologists" not mentally ill. The president of the Court of Assizes, Dr. Martinolli, then proposed to rely on an assessment carried out by three professors: Ponti, Fornari and Bruno. They came to the conclusion that: "Bergamo has reached extreme perversion: murder for enjoyment. After the first murder, he discovered that killing satisfied his pleasures, and at the same time the feared and hated object: the woman. [...] For Bergamo, to kill now represented the extreme sadistic perversion, the strongest way to possess the woman."

On 8 March 1994, International Women's Day, Bergamo was convicted. A journalist of the local newspaper Alto Adige, Paolo Cagnan, wrote to Bergamo, who promptly replied: "I, Marco Bergamo, committed only three murders and confessed them, the murders of Troger and Cipolletti were committed by a second person potentially more dangerous than me".

RAI announced on 18 April of the same year that an episode of the television programme Un giorno in pretura would focus on Bergamo's trial. On the same day, Bergamo's father, 72-year-old Renato, hanged himself in his attic.

== Imprisonment ==
After spending 24 years in various institutions due to issues related to maximum security, on 15 February he was transferred to the prison of Bollate, the second prison house in Milan. In May, the heads of the DAP ("Penitentiary Administration Department") had arranged for his transfer to a rehabilitative prison where each prisoner can serve his sentence not under punitive terms but according to a self-awareness recovery philosophy that evaluates the goals and expectations of the offender.

In 2005, Bergamo obtained a prize permission to leave prison; this news shocked the whole of Italy. As it was only hypothesized, during the summer of 2008 he could have asked for parole from the surveilling judge Guido Rispoli, but he did not receive it.

The Court of Assizes of Bolzano in 2014, again through PM Rispoli, had returned to the case concerning Bergamo, but had to reject the request to obtain a judgment by means of an abbreviated rite. In fact, Bergamo could not enjoy this right because it was not intended for life imprisonment, moreover, for the penal code there can be no penalty discounts in cases such as these, or with final and irrevocable sentences.

== Death ==
At 51, while serving his sentence at the Bollate prison near Milan, Bergamo asked the hospital's director to be urgently transferred, where he was found to have a serious lung infection. After 10 days he went into a coma, dying on 17 October 2017, without reawakening.

== Victims ==
Marco Bergamo was convicted of murdering 5 women between 1985 and 1992:

- Marcella Casagrande, 15
- Anna Maria Cipolletti, 41
- Renate Rauch, 24
- Renate Troger, 18
- Marika Zorzi, 19

== See also ==
- Ferdinand Gamper
- List of serial killers by country
