= Giulio Versorese =

Italian painter

Giulio Versorese (born 11 May 1868) was an Italian painter.

He was born in Florence. He studied at the Academy of Fine Arts of Florence. He exhibited at the Promotrice of Florence . He also completed portraits, among them of Lieutenant Grimaldi, signor Rapi, and the painter Emilio Amadei, as well as many studies of the surroundings of Florence including Cascine painted outdoors, and figures in open air, including pastels and watercolors.
