= Monastero delle Murate =

Former convent in Florence, Italy

Coordinates: 43.769094°N 11.268686°E

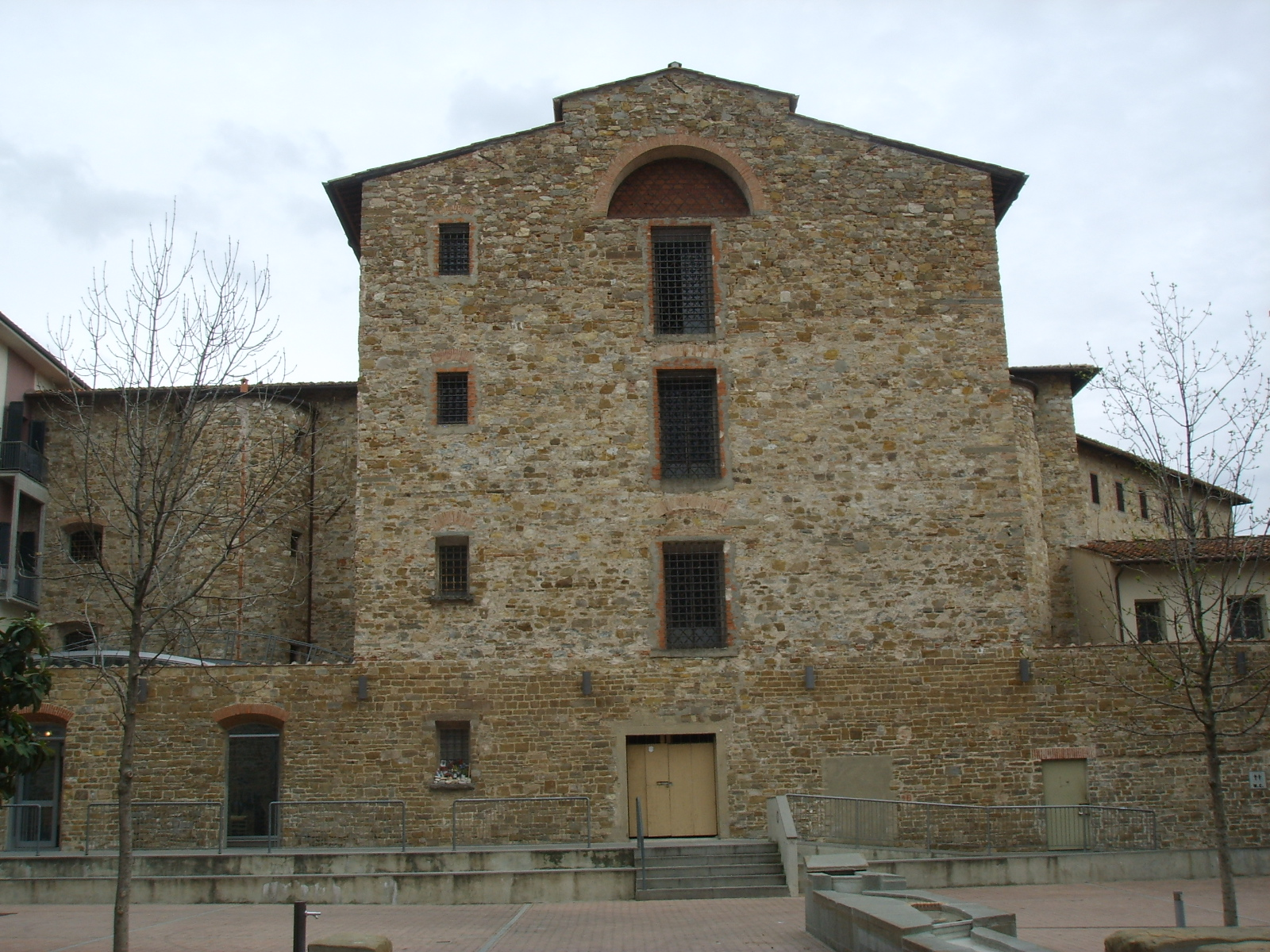
Monastero delle Murate

Monastero delle Murate (Monastery of Murate) is a former Benedictine convent on Via Ghibellina in Florence, Italy.

The religious community dates to 1370 when 12 women became voluntarily reclusive in a shack by the second pillar of the Ponte Rubaconte (Ponte alle Grazie), praying and living on alms in extremely difficult conditions. Given the growth in the number of sisters, in 1424, Giovanni de 'Benci, who lived nearby, financed the construction of a new, larger monastery near the walls, called the Most Holy Annunciation and St. Catherine. The monastery was renovated and expanded for the first time in 1471, following a fire, and then in 1571, after a flood. Supporters included Lorenzo de' Medici. Also in 1509 Caterina Sforza was buried in the monastery.

For about a hundred years, from 1883 to 1985, it was the men's prison in Florence, after which the detainees were transferred to Sollicciano and other facilities.

Since the 21st century, it has served as a restaurant and meeting places, with additional apartments, bars, restaurants and shops.

== Bibliography ==
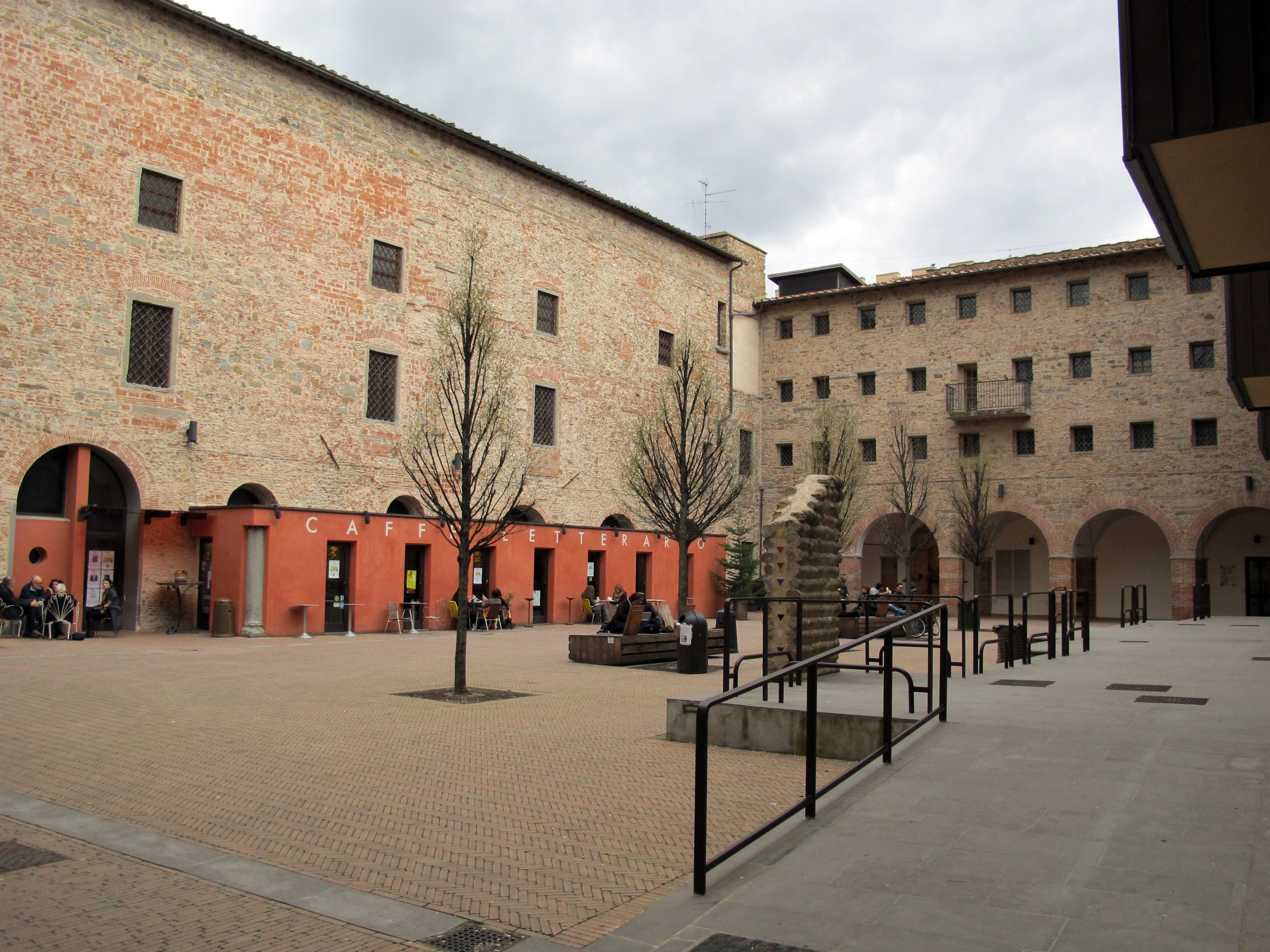
Piazza delle Murate

- Connell, William J. (2002). Society and Individual in Renaissance Florence. University of California Press. ISBN 978-0-520-23254-9.
- Ferdinando Ruggieri, Studio d'architettura civile sopra gli ornamenti di porte, e finestre, colle misure, piante, modini, e profili, tratte da alcune fabbriche insigni di Firenze erette col disegno de' più celebri architetti, 3 voll., Firenze, nella Stamperia Reale presso Gio. Gaetano Tartini e Santi Franchi, 1722–1728., I, 1722, tavv. 19-20;
- Federico Fantozzi, Nuova guida ovvero descrizione storico artistico critica della città e contorni di Firenze, Firenze, Giuseppe e fratelli Ducci, 1842, p. 280, n. 60;
- Federico Fantozzi, Pianta geometrica della città di Firenze alla proporzione di 1 a 4500 levata dal vero e corredata di storiche annotazioni, Firenze, Galileiana, 1843, p. 221, nn. 544, 546; Firenze 1850, p. 386;
- Carlo Morelli, Le Carceri penitenziali della Toscana: studi igienici, Firenze, Tip. Nicola Fabbrini, 1865;
- Emilio Burci, Guida artistica della città di Firenze, riveduta e annotata da Pietro Fanfani, Firenze, Tipografia Cenniniana, 1875, p. 160;
- Emilio Bacciotti, Firenze illustrata nella sua storia, famiglie, monumenti, arti e scienze dalla sua origine fino ai nostri tempi, 3 voll., Firenze, Stabilimento Tipografico Mariani e Tipografia Cooperativa, 1879–1886, III, 1886, pp. 227–228;
- Walther Limburger, Die Gebäude von Florenz: Architekten, Strassen und Plätze in alphabetischen Verzeichnissen, Leipzig, F.A. Brockhaus, 1910, n. 490; Garneri 1924, pp. 256–257, n. XLI;
- Walther Limburger, Le costruzioni di Firenze, traduzione, aggiornamenti bibliografici e storici a cura di Mazzino Fossi, Firenze, Soprintendenza ai Monumenti di Firenze, 1968 (dattiloscritto presso la Biblioteca della Soprintendenza per i Beni Architettonici e per il Paesaggio per le province di Firenze Pistoia e Prato, 4/166), n. 490;
- Piero Bargellini, Ennio Guarnieri, Le strade di Firenze, 4 voll., Firenze, Bonechi, 1977–1978, II, 1977, p. 34;
- Carlo Cresti, Luigi Zangheri, Architetti e ingegneri nella Firenze dell'Ottocento, Firenze, Uniedit, 1978, p. 117;
- Osanna Fantozzi Micali, Piero Roselli, Le soppressioni dei conventi a Firenze. Riuso e trasformazioni dal sec. XVIII in poi, Firenze, Libreria Editrice Fiorentina, 1980, pp. 78–79;
- Piero Roselli, Rita Affortunati, Giuseppe Centauro, Giampaolo Trotta, Da un'idea per le Murate: annotazioni dentro e fuori il concorso, in "Bollettino Ingegneri", XXXV, 1987, 9, pp. 3–19;
- Un'idea per le Murate. Progetti ammessi alla prima fase del Concorso internazionale bandito dal Comune di Firenze, a cura di G. Conti, Milano, Electa, 1988;
- Firenze. Guida di Architettura, a cura del Comune di Firenze e della Facoltà di Architettura dell'Università di Firenze, coordinamento editoriale di Domenico Cardini, progetto editoriale e fotografie di Lorenzo Cappellini, Torino, Umberto Allemandi & C., 1992, pp. 266–267, n. 206 C;
- Giampaolo Trotta, Le Murate, un microcosmo nel cuore di Firenze, Firenze, Edizioni Comune aperto, 1999;
- Mauro Pittalis, Roberto Melosi, Le Murate, Area 5, in "Opere", 2004, 7, pp. 44–51.
- Franco Cesati, Le strade di Firenze. Storia, aneddoti, arte, segreti e curiosità della città più affascinante del mondo attraverso 2400 vie, piazze e canti, 2 voll., Roma, Newton & Compton editori, 2005, I, p. 280;
- Touring Club Italiano, Firenze e provincia, Milano, Touring Editore, 2005, p. 413;
- Claudio Paolini, Architetture fiorentine. Case e palazzi nel quartiere di Santa Croce, Firenze, Paideia, 2009, p. 18, n. 4;
- L'architettura in Toscana dal 1945 ad oggi. Una guida alla selezione delle opere di rilevante interesse storico-artistico, a cura di Andrea Aleardi e Corrado Marcetti della Fondazione Michelucci, con la collaborazione di Alessandra Vittorini del MiBAC/PaBAAC, Firenze, Alinea editrice, 2011, pp. 98–99, n. FI91;
- Simonetta Michelotti, Ottanta anni alle Murate, cronache del carcere di Firenze, storie di uomini, ideali, tragedie. Un simbolo della sofferenza oggi riconquistato dalla città. Firenze, Nardini Editore, 2013, p. 224.
