= Alleanza Cattolica =

Italian Catholic association

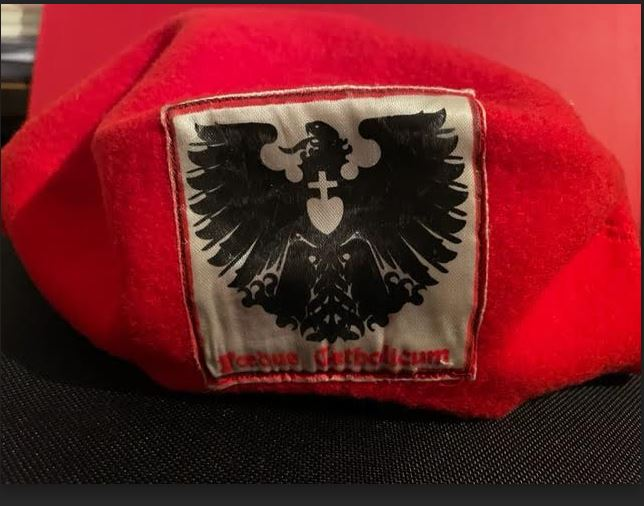
"boina roja" (red beret) used by the Alleanza Cattolica (formerly Foedus Catholicum)

Alleanza Cattolica (English: Catholic Alliance), originally known as Foedus Catholicum, is an Italian Catholic association.

== Activities ==
The association aims to study and disseminate the social doctrine of the Catholic Church. Since 1973, Alleanza Cattolica has published the bimonthly magazine Cristianità, which is dedicated to "the dissemination of the Church's social doctrine and counter-revolutionary thought."

Cristianità has promoted a revisionist interpretation of the Italian Risorgimento, influenced by the thought of Brazilian intellectual Plinio Corrêa de Oliveira, and has analyzed the role of revolutionary forces in the historical process. While accepting the concept of a unified state encompassing the national territory, Alleanza Cattolica seeks to re-examine the legitimacy of the secular order established after the Risorgimento.

== History ==
=== Catholic traditionalism and association with SSPX (1960–1981) ===
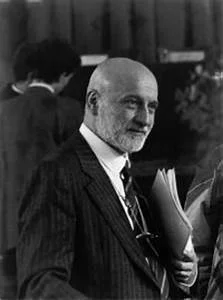
Giovanni Cantoni, founder of Alleanza Cattolica.

Alleanza Cattolica was founded informally in 1960 by Giovanni Cantoni and Agostino Sanfratello. The organization gained a more formal structure beginning in 1968, with the establishment of a governing directory in 1977 and the adoption of a statute in 1998.

An article in Charlie Hebdo described Alleanza Cattolica as "the Italian subsidiary" of the Brazilian group Tradition, Family, and Property (TFP). Historian Alessandro Capone characterizes Alleanza Cattolica as "among the most influential centres in the traditionalist galaxy, not least because of its connections with specific sectors of the centre-right."

In January 1971, Agostino Sanfratello (from Piacenza), Marco Tangheroni (from Pisa), and Franco Maestrelli (from Milan) were the first to request a referendum against Italy's divorce law at the Court of Cassation.

The Pisa unit of Alleanza Cattolica, dedicated to Saint Henry the Emperor, included pharmacologist Giulio Soldani, historian Marco Tangheroni, psychiatrist Mario Di Fiorino, and brothers Attilio and Renato Tamburrini.

Alleanza Cattolica maintained a strong relationship with Archbishop Marcel Lefebvre, founder of the Society of Saint Pius X (SSPX). Agostino Sanfratello, one of the organization's founders, and Don Pietro Cantoni, brother of co-founder Giovanni Cantoni, entered the seminary at Écône, established by Lefebvre. Sanfratello later left the seminary, while Don Pietro was ordained a priest in December 1978.

On 6 June 1977, several members of Alleanza Cattolica—including Baron Roberto de Mattei, Giulio Soldani, Massimo Introvigne, Mario Di Fiorino, and Attilio and Renato Tamburrini—attended a conference in Rome on the Second Vatican Council, delivered by Archbishop Lefebvre at the invitation of Princess Elvina Pallavicini.

=== Break with Lefebvre and rapprochement with Vatican (1981–present) ===
In 1981, the relationship between the Society of Saint Pius X (SSPX) and Alleanza Cattolica came to an end. A group of young Italian seminarians left the Écône seminary and were later incardinated into the Diocese of Apuania by Bishop Aldo Forzoni. Massimo Introvigne, a leading member of Alleanza Cattolica, argued that the fundamental cause of the split with Archbishop Marcel Lefebvre was doctrinal rather than political. A key point of contention was the interpretation of the writings of Joseph de Maistre. According to Introvigne, Lefebvre focused exclusively on Du Pape, neglecting de Maistre's broader view of religion, including the idea that "true religion is more than two thousand years old; it was born on the day in which the days were born."

The 1981 rupture, marked by the departure of seminarians and priests from Écône, was seen by Giovanni Cantoni as a response to what he considered a schismatic act: "the decision of Msgr. Lefebvre to consider confirmations of the Conciliar Church invalid and to re-administer them." Mario Di Fiorino, however, challenged Introvigne's account, noting that Archbishop Lefebvre's "prudent doubt" regarding the validity of the new confirmation rite preceded the 6 June 1977, conference and Mass at Palazzo Pallavicini, which was attended by Alleanza Cattolica leaders. On 22 May 1977, at the Church of Saint-Nicolas du Chardonnet in Paris—occupied by traditionalist Catholics—Lefebvre confirmed more than one hundred boys and expressed doubts about the validity of confirmations performed according to the new rite.

According to Bishop Bernard Tissier de Mallerais (2005), Archbishop Lefebvre questioned the validity of the sacrament of confirmation due to changes to its form, introduced on 15 August 1971, which drew from an Eastern liturgical formula. Lefebvre believed the new wording expressed the sacrament’s special character less clearly, especially in vernacular translations. His concerns deepened after Pope Paul VI, on 30 November 1972, authorized the use of any vegetable oil—rather than just olive oil—for the sacrament, contrary to long-standing Catholic tradition. In 1975, when criticized by cardinals for confirming in dioceses without episcopal consent and for conditionally re-administering confirmation, Lefebvre responded: "The faithful have the right to receive the sacraments in a valid way. I have a prudent doubt."

Following the election of Pope John Paul II, Archbishop Lefebvre was received in a private audience by the new pope in November 1978. Relations initially appeared to improve, with discussions pointing toward a possible agreement based on interpreting the Second Vatican Council in continuity with Tradition and the Church's constant Magisterium. Lefebvre stated: "Ours is an era in which natural and supernatural law come before positive ecclesiastical law when the latter opposes it instead of being its channel."

Roberto de Mattei, a prominent figure in Alleanza Cattolica, later described the 1981 turning point as a shift in political strategy. Reflecting on the period after Giovanni Cantoni's death, de Mattei used the Trotskyist term "entryism" to characterize the group's new approach. He wrote: "In 1978, John Paul II was elected, and Cantoni, who had great faith in the new Polish pope, believed that Alleanza Cattolica should change its strategy, moving from 'opposition' to what he defined as entryism, i.e. collaboration with the authorities and ecclesiastical movements."

The statute of Alleanza Cattolica was formalized in 1998. In 2012, Bishop Gianni Ambrosio of Piacenza-Bobbio officially recognized Alleanza Cattolica as an association of the Christian faithful. Its motto, Ad maiorem Dei gloriam et socialem, echoes that of the Society of Jesus. Its symbol is the Sacred Heart superimposed on a black eagle, representing Saint John the Evangelist and signifying "the will to be children of Mary."

== See also ==
- Radio Maria
