= Mario Di Fiorino =

Italian psychiatrist

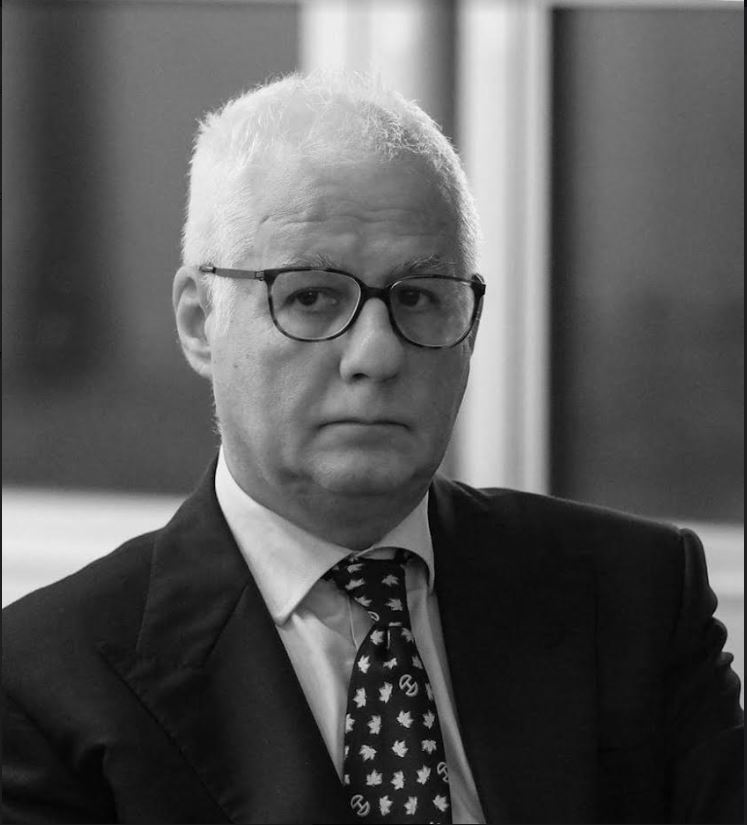
Mario Di Fiorino

Mario Di Fiorino (born 22 May 1953) is an Italian psychiatrist and Director of Psychiatry at the Ospedale Versilia in Lido di Camaiore (LU), Italy till 31 May 2023. The author of numerous scientific papers and books, his main areas of research are related to mental manipulation, violence, and dissociative disorders.

== Life and career ==
Di Fiorino was born in Forte dei Marmi and received his medical degree from the University of Pisa in 1978. He went on to qualify as a specialist in psychiatry in 1982 and child neuropsychiatry in 1986. Before taking up his post as Director of Psychiatry at the Ospedale Versilia in 2002, he served in the same capacity at the Ospedale Psichiatrico Giudiziario di Castiglione delle Stiviere (a hospital for the criminally insane) in Mantua and taught in the school of Clinical Criminology at the University of Modena. At the time he worked as a forensic psychiatrist and was appointed by the defense of Marco Bergamo a serial killer, who murdered five women between 1985 and 1992. At first Di Fiorino argued that the client was not culpable with mental illness. Introna, director of Forensic Medicine at the University of Padua, appointed by the Court of Assizes of Bolzano, agreed with this thesis and declared Marco Bergamo not liable for mental illness proposing his internment in a Judicial Psychiatric Hospital [[]]. As a forensic psychiatrist, he dealt with a famous case for the cult litigation in Italy. He was appointed by the Public Prosecutor of Brescia in the matter relating to a failed deprogramming of a member of Scientology (judgment of the G.I.P. of March 19, 1991. [[]]. « even when it can be assumed that conditioning processes are prevalent in the affiliation to the controversial cult, one must reject the illusion of deprogramming, true brainwashing of the opposite sign. To use Maistrian's illuminating formulation, one should not point to a brainwashing of the opposite sign, but to the opposite of brainwashing. And therefore favor the re-emergence of a critical attitude in the evaluation of the affiliation experience by appealing to the residual critical capacities" [[]] A few years after the declaration of unconstitutionality of the plagio at the presence of Leonetto Amadei, the President of the Constitutional Court of the Italian Republic, Mario Di Fiorino organized a scientific conference in Forte dei Marmi in 1989 on "Socially accepted persuasion, plagio and brainwashing", for the discuss of the new situation.[3] [[]] Specifically, according to Giovanni Flora [[]], professor of criminal law at the University of Ferrara, the Court sanctioned the vagueness of the wording of the criminal case, "citing the fact of impossibility of verify essentially covered by the present case, So for the Author the Court thought the impossibility of its assessment with logical-rational criteria, with an intolerable risk of arbitrators of the judicial body. Michael Langone commented that in this debate was discussed the whole range of phenomena associated with mental manipulation. In 1984 he founded the study center, Psichiatria e Territorio, and its journal of the same name and in 2002 co-founded the journal Bridging Eastern and Western Psychiatry with the Portuguese psychiatrist Maria Luisa Figueira. Several of his studies have focused on mental manipulation in cults and the psychology of their leaders. His study of the Italian apocalyptic cult, Gruppo del Rosario, formed the basis of his 1996 book, Se il mondo non finisce: Quando la profezia non si avvera. The book was published in English three years later as If the world does not end. When the prophecy plays false! with a foreword by Jean-François Mayer. In 2008 Di Fiorino was awarded the Premio Firenze for services to psychiatry. He coordinated the Italian national trial on Quetiapine [[]]. With regard to political and cultural commitment, he has taken part since the end of the 1960s in the activities of Alleanza Cattolica, in the "cross" of Pisa, dedicated to Henry II, Holy Roman Emperor together with the historian Marco Tangheroni, the pharmacologist Giulio Soldani and the brothers Attilio and Renato Tamburrini [] In the 1970s he collaborated with the pharmacologist Giulio Soldani on cultural initiatives to combat divorce, drugs and drug addiction and abortion ] In 1976 he met Monsignor Marcel Lefebvre in the Spiritual Exercises in the Santa Croce Monastery of the Discalced Carmelite Fathers of Bocca di Magra. On June 6, 1977 he participated in Rome in the conference on the Second Vatican Council of the archbishop monsignor Marcel Lefebvre in Palazzo Pallavicini Rospigliosi at the invitation of Princess Elvina Pallavicini [. In 2005 he participated in the works of the Permanent Justice Commission of the Senate, coordinated by sen. Furio Gubetti, on the proposals for the reform of law 180 of 1978 Di Fiorino expressed his critical position towards the Basaglia law (1978) in many European psychiatric congresses [] He was the drafter of the bill "Amendments to articles 33, 34 and 35 of the law of 23 December 1978, n 833, concerning voluntary and compulsory health checks and treatments (S. 656, first signatory Raffaella Marin (Lega) presented in July 2018 to the Senate []

== Selected publications ==
- Di Fiorino, Mario; Cirillo, Mauro; Carlesi, Giovanni. (1985). "Considerations on suicide in substance dependence". Minerva psichiatrica, Vol. 26, No 2, pp. 215–216.
- Di Fiorino, Mario (1996). Se il mondo non finisce: Quando la profezia non si avvera (in Italian). Psichiatria e Territorio . Published in English translation by J. Wilson Fledd (1999) as If the world does not end. When the prophecy plays false!. Del Bucchia. ISBN 8847100550
- Betti, Mario; Di Fiorino, Mario (1997). e igiene mentale: Ruolo e funzioni dell'infermiere (in Italian). McGraw-Hill Companies. ISBN 8838626294 Mario Di Fiorino (Ed): La persuasione socialmente accettata, il plagio e il lavaggio del cervello, Forte dei Marmi, Psichiatria e Territorio vol . I, 1990.
- Di Fiorino, Mario (1998). L'illusione comunitaria: La costruzione moderna delle comunità artificiali (in Italian). Moretti & Vitali. ISBN 8871861078
- Caparesi, Cristina; Di Fiorino, Mario; Kent, Stephen (2002). Costretti ad amare: Saggi sui Bambini di Dio/The Family. Psichiatria e Territorio
- Di Fiorino, Mario (2007). "La costruzione moderna delle 'comunità artificiali' settarie" in Eugenio Fizzotti (ed.) Sette e nuovi movimenti religiosi (in Italian), pp. 121–142. Paoline . ISBN 8831533274
- Di Fiorino, Mario; Gemignani, Alfredo (2004). Il paziente violento: La gestione medica della crisi (in Italian). Psichiatria e Territorio.
- Di Fiorino, Mario; Martinucci, Mirko (2007). The figures of melancholy and mania. De melancholiae et maniae figuris. (in English and Latin). Psichiatria e Territorio. ISBN 8890390085.
- Di Fiorino, Mario; Pacciardi, Bruno (2008). Bulimia nervosa: Una guida pratica (in Italian). Psichiatria e Territorio. ISBN 889039000X
- Di Fiorino Mario “The Italian experiment, fruit of ideological passion” La Vela (Viareggio) (2019)
- Di Fiorino Mario e Martinucci Mirko, Alcoolismo e tossicomania. Una guida per pazienti e familiari. Psichiatria e Territorio, 2006"
- Di Fiorino, Mario; Ungaretti Dell'Immagine, Francesco; Marin, Raffaella F. (2018). Il bisogno di un luogo per la cura (in Italian). Viareggio (Lucca): La vela. ISBN 978-88-99661-33-5. OCLC 1050085664.
