= Bollate Prison =

Prison in Milan, Italy

- Interactive map of Bollate Prison
- Location: Via Cristina Belgioioso 120, Milan, Lombardy, Italy; 45°31′31″N 9°05′51″E
- Status: Operational
- Capacity: 1,267
- Population: 1,624 (13 September 2026)
- Opened: December 2000
- Managed by: Ministry of Justice

Bollate Prison, officially the Second House of Detention of Milan-Bollate (Italian: Seconda casa di reclusione di Milano-Bollate), is a prison in Milan, Lombardy, Italy. It opened in December 2000.

It is one of the few Italian institutions run as an open prison, with cells left unlocked during the day and inmates moving around the site to reach work and training. As of 13 September 2026 it held 1,624 inmates against 1,267 regulation places.

== Facilities and activities ==
The institution was opened as a low-security facility for ordinary prisoners, who are not considered socially dangerous.

Inmates take part in schooling, language courses and vocational training as carpenters, electricians and cooks.

The site also houses InGalera, a restaurant open to the paying public and staffed almost entirely by inmates. Built in a block formerly used as a dormitory for prison officers, by 2016 its tables were being booked two months in advance.

As of January 2026, 208 inmates worked under article 21 of the Italian prison law and 46 were on semi-liberty. Another 175 were employed inside the prison by cooperatives and companies, and 350 worked in shifts for the prison administration.

=== Women's section ===
The prison has eight wards, two of them for women; one of the two houses inmates authorised to work outside the walls under article 21 of the Italian prison law or on semi-liberty. At the time of a survey published in 2023 by the prison monitoring organisation Antigone, 140 of the 1,371 people held at Bollate were women, and the institution was the largest in Lombardy.

The women's ward opened in 2008 with fifty inmates and by 2026 held more than 180, the largest female population of any Italian prison. Susanna Ripamonti, editor of the inmate-written magazine carteBollate, has said that only low-skilled jobs are available, such as cleaning and kitchen duties, with low pay.
