= Emilio Amadei =

Italian painter

Emilio Amadei (born 12 March 1867) was an Italian painter.

He was born in Florence. He completed his studies at the Academy of Fine Arts of Florence, under professor Giovanni Fattori with whom he worked for about two years. He exhibited in 1889 at the Promotrice of Florence a figure of a woman outdoors, and an interior with a young girl. He also completed portraits, among them of signore Baldini, signore Puliti, and the painter Giulio Versorese, as well as many studies of the surroundings of Florence painted outdoors, and figures in open air or studio. He displayed in 1892 at Florence Summer Morning, and in 1896, Brutto tempo. He also painted an altarpiece depicting the Beheading of John the Baptist.
