= Leonetto Amadei =

Italian politician (1911–1997)

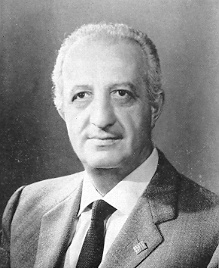

Personal details
- Born: 7 August 1911; Seravezza
- Died: 10 November 1997 (aged 86); Marina di Pietrasanta

Leonetto Amadei (Seravezza, 7 August 1911 – Marina di Pietrasanta, 10 November 1997) was an Italian lawyer and a politician.

Amadei graduated from the University of Pisa. As a lawyer, he often took on cases defending the weak, the oppressed, and workers.

In 1946 he was nominated by the Italian Socialist Party in the elections for the Constituent Assembly, and following his election chosen for the Constitutional Commission (it:Commissione per la Costituzione), where he mainly worked on the elaboration of the first part of the Constitution of Italy.

Subsequently Amadei was elected deputy in the district of Lucca, Livorno, Pisa and Massa Carrara, again for the Italian Socialist Party, and he also held the post of Secretary to the Ministry of Justice in the first Rumor Government. Amadei was re-elected several consecutive times for parliament until 1972, when he became a member of the Constitutional Court.

Amadei was elected President of the same Court on 5 March 1979 and held the chair until 28 June 1981.

His name is particularly linked to decision no. 96 of 8 June 1981, which declared the unconstitutionality of the crime of plagio, erasing the legal prosecution, because in contrast "with the principle of obligatory nature of the case contained in the absolute reservation of law in criminal cases, enshrined in Article. 25 the Constitution. "Specifically, according to Giovanni Flora, professor of criminal law at the University of Ferrara, the Court sanctioned the vagueness of the wording of the criminal case, "citing the fact of impossibility of verify essentially covered by the present case, however, the impossibility of its assessment with logical-rational criteria, the intolerable risk of arbitrators of the judicial body. "

There is the common- sense recognition that some people, especially those who are suggestible, can be manipulated and exploited to a high degree. The effect of such domination is the annihilation of the subject's freedom and self-determination and the consequent negation of his or her personality. The crime of plagio have rarely been prosecuted in Italy, and only one person was ever convicted. In Italy the Court declared plagio unconstitutional found the concept to be imprecise, lacking coherence, and liable to arbitrary application (1981)

After few years the President Amadei took part at the scientific conference "Persuasion socially accepted, plagiarism and brainwashed", organized by Mario Di Fiorino, in Forte dei Marmi, in 1989, to discuss the new situation. .

According to the commentary by Michael Langone in Cultic Studies Journal (1,126 -129 IX) of International Cultic Studies Association, in this debate was discussed the whole range of phenomena associated with mental manipulation

== Honour ==
- Italy: Knight Grand Cross of the Order of Merit of the Italian Republic (30 september 1972)
