= Cesare Musatti =

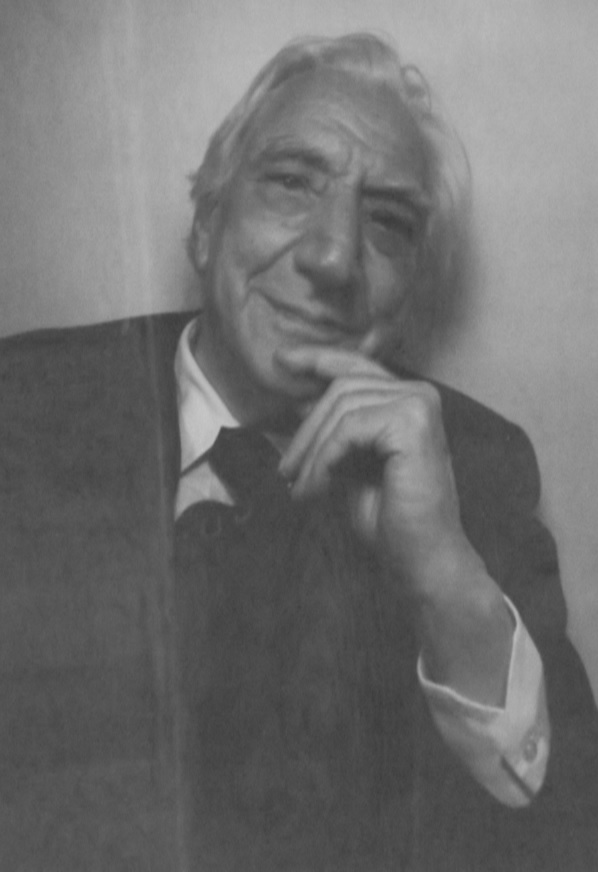
- Born: 21 September 1897; Dolo, Italy
- Died: 21 March 1989 (aged 91); Milan, Italy
- Citizenship: Italy
- Education: University of Padua
- Scientific career
- Fields: Psychoanalysis

Cesare Luigi Musatti (21 September 1897 - 21 March 1989) was an Italian philosopher and psychoanalyst. He was a leading figure for the first generation of Italian psychoanalysts. Musatti studied under Vittorio Benussi before becoming his assistant. Musatti edited the Italian edition of the works of Sigmund Freud.

== Life ==
Musatti's mother was a non-practicing Neapolitan Catholic, while father was Elia Musatti, a Venetan Jew who had been elected as a socialist deputy to the Italian parliament where he became a friend of Giacomo Matteotti. Musatti was neither baptised nor circumcised. During the fascist persecutions after the passage of Italy's racial laws, he managed to obtain a false baptisimal certificate from the Carmelites at Santa Maria in Traspontina. Though unreligious, he had his own children baptised according to the rites of the Waldensian Evangelical Church.

== Selected works ==
- Trattato di psicoanalisi, Paolo Boringhieri, Torino
