= Massimo Introvigne =

Italian sociologist of religion (born 1955)

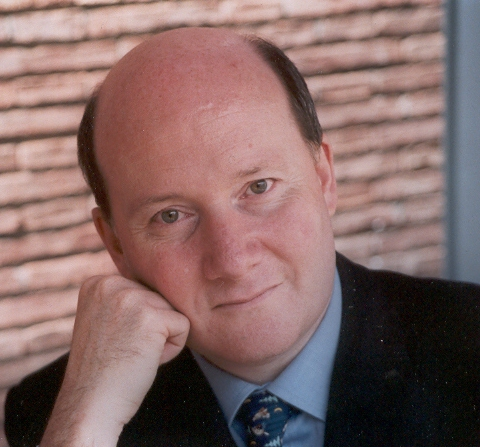
- Introvigne in 2006
- Born: June 14, 1955 (age 71); Rome, Italy
- Occupation: Author

Academic background
- Education: Pontifical Gregorian University (B.A.); University of Turin (J.D.)

Academic work
- Discipline: Sociology of religion
- Sub-discipline: Academic study of new religious movements
- Institutions: Center for Studies on New Religions (CESNUR)
- Website: massimointrovigne.com

Massimo Introvigne (born June 14, 1955) is an Italian sociologist of religion, author, and intellectual property attorney. He is a co-founder and the managing director of the Center for Studies on New Religions (CESNUR), a Turin-based nonprofit organization that focuses on the academic study of new religious movements. It has been described as "the highest profile lobbying and information group for controversial religions".

== Early life and career ==
Introvigne was born in Rome, Italy on June 14, 1955. Introvigne earned a B.A. in Philosophy from the Pontifical Gregorian University in Rome in 1975, and a J.D. from the University of Turin in 1979. He worked for the law firm Jacobacci e Associati as an intellectual property attorney, specializing in domain names.

He joined Alleanza Cattolica in 1972, a conservative lay Catholic association, for which he has received much criticism. From 2008 to 2016, he was the vice-president of the association. Beginning in 2012, Introvigne was listed as an "invited professor of sociology of religious movements" at the Salesian Pontifical University in Turin. Introvigne is a proponent of the theory of religious economy developed by Rodney Stark.

In 2012, Introvigne was appointed chairperson of the newly-formed Observatory of Religious Liberty of the Italian Ministry of Foreign Affairs.

== New religious movements ==
In 1988, Introvigne co-founded the Center for Studies on New Religions (CESNUR), a nonprofit organization based in Turin that studies new religious movements and opposes the anti-cult movement. Introvigne is the group director of CESNUR. Beginning in 2018, Introvigne was editor-in-chief of the daily magazine on religious issues and human rights in China and elsewhere, Bitter Winter, which is published by CESNUR.

Swedish academic Per Faxneld, writing for Reading Religion, described Introvigne as "one of the major names in the study of new religions." His 2016 book Satanism: A Social History received praise from several scholars as one of the best books on modern Satanism. Faxneld and Johan Nilson, in their 2023 survey of Satanism published by Oxford University Press, identified it as one of the "best and most comprehensive broad histories of Satanism", and characterized Introvigne as one of the "founding fathers" of Satanist studies.

Sociologist Roberto Cipriani has called Introvigne "one of the Italian sociologists of religion most well-known abroad, and among the world's leading scholars of new religious movements". In George D. Chryssides's Historical Dictionary of New Religious Movements, Introvigne is noted to be "regarded as a cult apologist" by members of the anticult movement. In 2001, sociologist Stephen A. Kent described Introvigne as a "persistent critic of any national attempts to identify or curtail so-called 'cults'", arguing that "he advocates doctrinaire positions that favour groups like Scientology" and that "on [CESNUR's] web page Introvigne intermingles ideological positions within solid research and information". In the mid-1990s, Introvigne testified on behalf of Scientologists in a criminal trial in Lyon. After Introvigne was critical of the publication of the 1995 report on cults by the French government, investigative journalist Serge Faubert described Introvigne as a "cult apologist", saying he was tied to the Alleanza Cattolica and Silvio Berlusconi's then ruling party. Introvigne responded that his scholarly and political activities were not connected.

Introvigne has written on the concept of brainwashing, which he does not believe is real and has described it as a myth. In a 1997 interview with the Journal de Genève et Gazette de Lausanne, he said that some groups do practice "dishonest and deceptive techniques or to denigrating propaganda regarding other religious experiences", and that some groups should be monitored but that this must not risk religious freedom. CESNUR published the Encyclopedia of Religion in Italy in 2001, of which Introvigne was the main author. Introvigne is Editor-in-Chief of The Journal of CESNUR. It has been described by religious scholar Donald Westbrook as having "contributed heavily to the study of new religions and Scientology," and critical Scientology scholar Stephen A. Kent has also contributed to the journal, while journalist and Scientology-critic Tony Ortega penned a series of 2018/19 articles criticizing The Journal of CESNUR as an unreliable "apologist journal".

== Personal life ==
Introvigne is a Roman Catholic. Introvigne is also director of CESPOC, the Center for the Study of Popular Culture. He was the Italian director of the Transylvanian Society of Dracula, which included the leading academic scholars in the field of the literary and historical study of vampire myth. In 1997, J. Gordon Melton and Introvigne organized an event at the Westin Hotel in Los Angeles where 1,500 attendees came dressed as vampires for a "creative writing contest, Gothic rock music and theatrical performances".

Introvigne has been married twice and has four children.

== Bibliography ==
- —— (1989). Le nuove Religioni (in Italian). Milan: SugarCo. ISBN 88-7198-090-5.
- —— (1989). Lo spiritismo (in Italian). Leumann: Editrice Elle Di Ci. ISBN 88-0115-866-1.
- —— (1990). I nuovi culti: Dagli Hare Krishna alla Scientologia (in Italian). Milano: Mondadori. ISBN 88-0434-057-6.
- —— (1990). Il cappello del mago: i nuovi movimenti magici dallo spiritismo al satanismo (in Italian). Milan: SugarCo. ISBN 88-7198-021-2.
- —— (1990). Les Témoins de Jéhovah (in French). Translated by Baillet, Phillip. Paris: Éditions du Cerf. ISBN 2-204-04099-1.
- ——; Mayer, Jean-François; Zucchini, Ernesto (1990). I nuovi movimenti religiosi: Sette cristiane e nuovi culti (in Italian). Leumann: Editrice Elle Di Ci. ISBN 88-0114-260-9.
- —— (1991). Les Mormons (in French). Turnhout: Brepols. ISBN 2-503-50063-3.
- —— (1993). Il ritorno dello gnosticismo (in Italian). Milan: SugarCo. ISBN 88-7198-216-9.
- —— (1995). Idee che uccidono: Jonestown, Waco, il Tempio Solare (in Italian). Milan: Mimep-Docete. ISBN 88-86242-10-7.
- —— (1996). Les Veilleurs de l'Apocalypse: Millénarisme et nouvelles religions au seuil de l'an 2000 (in French). Claire Vigne. ISBN 2-84193-024-6.
- ——; Melton, J. Gordon, eds. (1996). Pour en finir avec les sectes: Le débat sur le rapport de la commission parlementaire (in French). Dervy. ISBN 88-8523-711-8.
- —— (1997). Enquête sur le Satanisme: Satanistes et antisatanistes du XVIIe siècle à nos jours (in French). Translated by Baillet, Philipp. Paris: Éditions Dervy. ISBN 2-85-076814-6.
- —— (2000). The Unification Church. Studies in Contemporary Religions. Signature Books. ISBN 1-56085-145-7.
- —— (2000). New Age & Next Age. Casale Monferrato: Piemme. ISBN 8-83-844775-6.
- Stark, Rodney; —— (2003). Dio è tornato: Indagine sulla rivincita delle religioni in Occidente (in Italian). Piemme. ISBN 88-384-6584-3.
- Iannaccone, Laurence R.; —— (2004). Il Mercato dei Martiri: L'industria del terrorismo suicida (in Italian). Lindau. ISBN 88-7180-514-3.
- —— (2008). Una battaglia nella notte: Plinio Corrêa de Oliveira e la crisi del secolo XX nella Chiesa (in Italian). Milan: SugarCo. ISBN 88-7198-564-8.
- —— (2010). I satanisti: Storia, riti e miti del satanismo (in Italian). Milan: SugarCo. ISBN 978-887198587-9.
- —— (2016). Satanism: A Social History. Brill Publishers. ISBN 978-90-04-28828-7.
- —— (2018). The Plymouth Brethren. Oxford University Press. ISBN 978-0-19-084242-0.
- —— (2019). Il libro nero della persecuzione religiosa in Cina (in Italian). Milan: SugarCo. ISBN 978-88-7198-753-8.
- —— (2020). Inside The Church of Almighty God: The Most Persecuted Religious Movement in China. Oxford University Press. ISBN 978-0-19-008909-2.
- —— (2022). Brainwashing: Reality or Myth?. Cambridge University Press. ISBN 978-1-00-902956-8.
- —— (2022). Sacred Eroticism: Tantra and Eros in the Movement for Spiritual Integration into the Absolute (MISA). Milan: Mimesis International. ISBN 978-8-86-977374-7.
- Rigel-Cellard, Bernadette; ——, eds. (2022). La Scientology: Sur la scène religieuse et sociale contemporaine (in Northern Frisian). Louvain-la-Neuve: EME Editions. ISBN 978-2-80-663769-7.
- ——; Šorytė, Rosita (2025). The Revelation Spiritual Home: The Revival of African Indigenous Spirituality. Cambridge University Press. ISBN 978-1-00-963039-9.
