= Antigone Association =

Italian prisoners' rights monitoring organization

The Antigone Association (Italian: Associazione Antigone) is an Italian prisoners' rights monitoring nongovernmental organization.

The association was established in 1991, hedquartered in Rome, with a number of regional offices. Since 2008 it has an office of ombudsman, which has no institutional powers, but it helps individuals to resolve their complaints.

In 1998, the Ministry of Justice of Italy gave Antigone a permanient permission to visit all Italian detention enters, and since 2007, a biannual, later annual report has been issued about prison conditions.

The organization issues a bimonthly journal, Antigone, following the tradition of its precursor with the same name issued in mid-1980s.

Since 2010, Antigone produces a radio show Jailhouse Rock aired by Radio Popolare. It features prison news and prisoners' stories, together with the covers of various artists performed by Freedom Sounds, a band from the Bollate Prison.
