= Renaud Marhic =

French writer (born 1965)

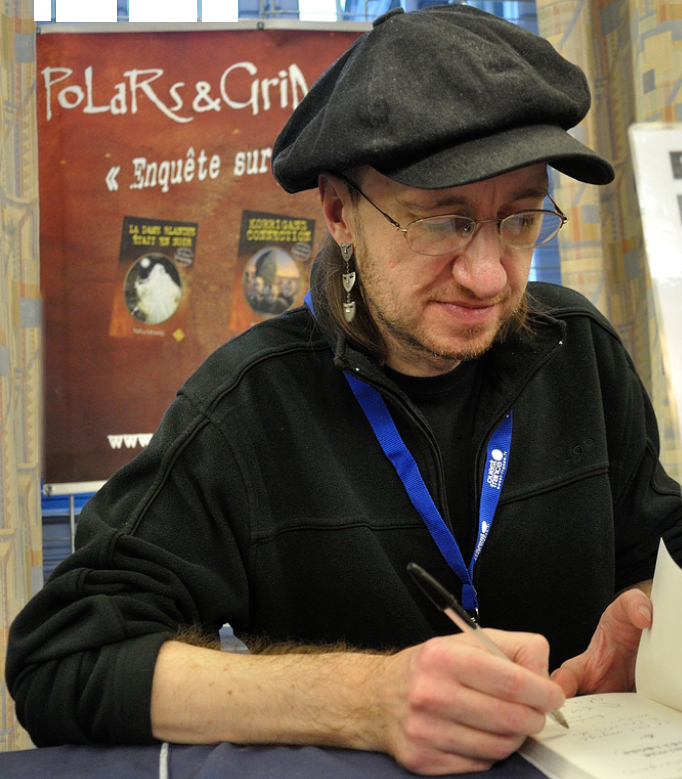
- Marhic pictured in 2020
- Born: July 1965 (age 61); Brest, Brittany, France
- Occupations: Writer; journalist
- Writing career
- Language: French
- Genres: Crime fiction; children's literature
- Subjects: Cults; the far-right; pseudoscience; terrorism; religious fundamentalism
- Notable works: Les Lutins Urbains, Enquête sur les extrémistes de l'occulte
- Website: marhic.fr

Renaud Marhic (born July 1965) is a French writer and journalist. He has written non-fiction books on topics including cults, the far-right, pseudoscience, terrorism, and religious fundamentalism. Marhic is also the writer of several crime novels, and the children's book series Les Lutins Urbains.

== Early life ==
Renaud Marhic was born July 1965, in Brest, Brittany, France. He had a column in the newspaper Le Vrai Papier Journal, which focused on rumors. He contributed as an investigative journalist to several other publications, including Charlie Hebdo, Le Nouvel Obs, VSD, and Entrevue.

Marhic was the founder and president of the group M... à l'apocalypse. Formed in June 1999, they gathered in Paris to celebrate the failure of Paco Rabanne's predictions of the Mir space station crashing into France. The group was to be disbanded later in August.

== Writing career ==
Marhic has written non fiction books on topic relating to cults, the far-right, pseudoscience, terrorism, and religious fundamentalism. He has been referred to as a cult expert by the media. He was the editor of the Faits et illusions series, which focused on pseudoscientific and paranormal topics from a scientific perspective.

In 1995, he published a book discussing the Order of the Solar Temple cult affair (a religious movement that had committed several high-profile acts of mass murder-suicide). The following year, he released an updated and expanded edition. In the book, he argues that the OTS did not dissolve after the first mass suicide, and a new leader had succeeded the dead ones; the group would commit another mass suicide later that year. He does not name the supposed third leader, but implicates Michel Tabachnik.

His past experience writing books related to crime, including the Solar Temple case, led to his interest in writing crime fiction. After the turn of the millennium, he wrote fiction novels and children's literature. He is the writer of the novel series Polars & Grimoires, published by Terre de Brume and the Les Lutins Urbains children's book series published by Éditions P'tit Louis. Les Lutins Urbains is inspired by Marhic's childhood experiences being told Breton folk tales. In presenting his works, he sometimes has displays of his characters as holograms.

== Bibliography ==
=== Non-fiction ===
- —— (1993). L'affaire Ummo: les extraterrestres qui venaient du froid (in French). Les Classiques du Mystère.
  - —— (1996). O.Z.N.: Afacerea Ummo (in Romanian). Bucuresti: Teora. ISBN 973-601-285-9.
- —— (1995). Enquête sur les extrémistes de l'occulte: de la loge P2 à l'Ordre du temple solaire (in French). Bordeaux: Horizon Chimérique. ISBN 2-907202-56-1.
  - —— (1996). L'Ordre du Temple Solaire: Enquête sur les extrémistes de l'Occulte II (in French). Bordeaux: Horizon Chimérique. ISBN 2-907202-58-8.
- ——; Kerlidou, Alain (1996). Sectes et mouvements initiatiques en Bretagne: du celtisme au nouvel âge (in French). Rennes: Terre de Brume. ISBN 2-908021-78-1.
- ——; de Keyser, Stéphane (1998). Voyage au bout de la secte (in French). Paris: Buchet-Chastel. ISBN 2-283-01767-X.
- ——; Besnier, Emmanuel (1999). Le New age: Son histoire, ses pratiques, ses arnaques (in French). Bordeaux: Le Castor astral. ISBN 2-85920-396-6.
- ——, ed. (2002). Guide Critique de L'Extraordinaire: Astrologie, Parapsychologie, Sectes, Ovnis, Divination, Occultisme, Prophéties, New Age... (in French). Bordeaux: Les Arts libéraux. ISBN 2-915078-00-9.
- —— (2003). Schisme'n'Blues (in French). Rennes: Terre de Brume. ISBN 2-84362-212-3.

=== Fiction ===
- —— (2000). Hermines et idées noires (in French). Rennes: Terre de Brume. ISBN 2-84362-082-1.
- —— (2007). Terminus Brocéliande. Polars & Grimoires (in French). Brest: AK éditions. ISBN 978-2-916184-08-1.
- —— (2008). L'Oreille de Denys (in French). Auxerre: Rhubarbe. ISBN 978-2-916597-14-0.
- —— (2009). Korrigans Connection. Polars & Grimoires (in French). Plougastel-Daoulas: EDB. ISBN 978-2-359-98009-7.
- —— (2013). Orphée.org. Polars & Grimoires (in French). Dinan: Terre de Brume. ISBN 978-2-84362-510-7.

=== Children's literature ===
- —— (2003). Lutins en milieu urbain (in French). Illustrated by David Roussel. Brest: AK éditions. ISBN 2-9518645-2-3.
- —— (2004). Lutins à la mode de Bretagne: et autres créatures fantastiques (in French). Illustrated by David Roussel. Brest: AK éditions. ISBN 2-9518645-6-6.
- ——; Rose, Joëlle (2005). Petit bêtisier féerique (in French). Illustrated by David Roussel. Brest: AK éditions. ISBN 2-9521514-9-0.
- —— (2013). L'attaque du Pizz' Raptor. Les Lutins Urbains (in French). Illustrated by Godo. Rennes: Éditions P'tit Louis. ISBN 978-2-914721-80-6.
- —— (2014). Le dossier Bug le gnome. Les Lutins Urbains (in French). Illustrated by Godo. Rennes: Éditions P'tit Louis. ISBN 978-2-914721-90-5.
- —— (2017). Le péril Groumf. Les Lutins Urbains (in French). Illustrated by Godo. Rennes: Éditions P'tit Louis. ISBN 978-2-373-73023-4.
- —— (2018). Korrigans et grosse galette. Les Lutins Urbains (in French). Illustrated by Godo. Rennes: Éditions P'tit Louis. ISBN 978-2-373-73057-9.
- —— (2024). Qui a piqué doudou ?. Les Lutins Urbains (in French). Illustrated by Sébastien Monteil. Rennes: Éditions P'tit Louis. ISBN 978-2-373-73111-8.
- —— (2024). Le mystère de la chaussette manquante. Les Lutins Urbains (in French). Illustrated by Sébastien Monteil. Rennes: Éditions P'tit Louis. ISBN 978-2-373-73110-1.
