= Luigi Berzano =

Italian sociologist

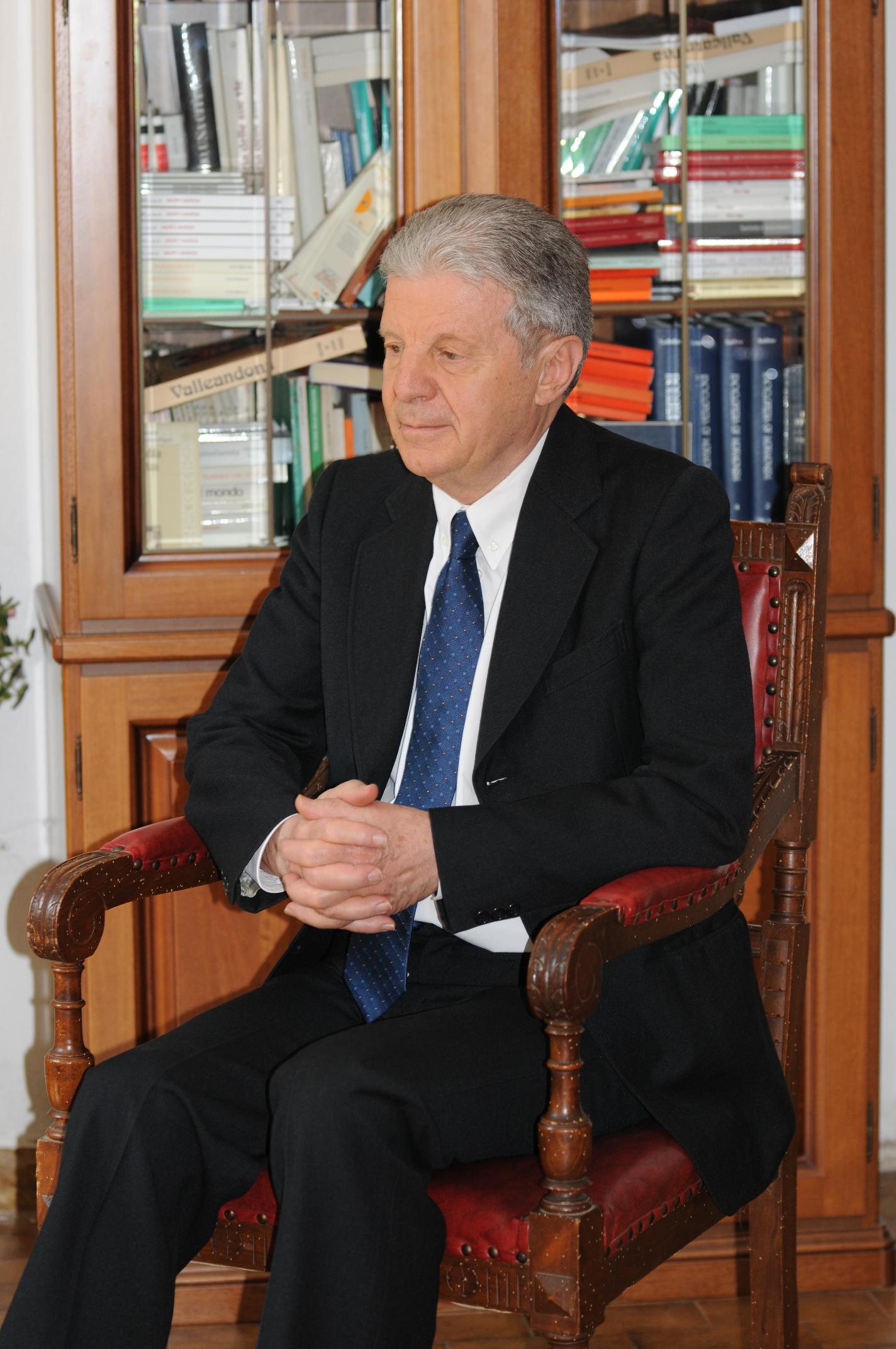
Luigi Berzano

Luigi Berzano (born 8 July 1939, Asti) is an Italian sociologist and Catholic priest.

== Biography ==
He is national coordinator of the Scientific Council of Religion Section of the Italian Association of Sociology and, since 1992, president of the Center for Studies on New Religions (CESNUR) . He is full professor at the Department of Cultures, Politic and Society of the University of Turin. He collaborates with the Faculty of Theology and Rebaudengo University in Turin. Since 2005, he is member of the Scientific Council of the Journal Studi di Sociologia of the Catholic University of Milan.

His research focuses on religious pluralism and freedom in multicultural societies, particularly in relation to individual and collective religious experiences. In this field, he conducted researches on spiritual movements such as New Age and also on historical religious minorities. In Sociologia dei lifestyles, he developed a new theory relating to the practices and collective behaviour in the religious field.

In 2010, he founded Osservatorio sul Pluralismo Religioso in Turin, which has recorded about 150 religious groups and forms in the metropolis of Turin, dividing them in five categories: groups with Judeo-Christian and Pentecostal Churches origins, groups and movements with eastern origins, groups founded in the West (New Age, esoteric and ufological groups, Damanhur) and Islam. He is coeditor of the Annual Review of the Sociology of Religion (Brill, Leiden-Boston).

== Bibliography ==
- L'analisi del contenuto nella ricerca sociologica, Pontificia Università Gregoriana, Roma, 1973.
- Partecipazione sociale e nuove forme religiose, TDF, Torino, 1977.
- Differenziazione e religione negli anni Ottanta, Giappichelli, Torino, 1990.
- Maghi e magie nell'Italia di oggi, (with Enzo Pace, Maria Immacolata Macioti, Vittorio Dini), Pontecorboli Editore, Firenze, 1991.
- Tutela e degrado del territorio, Il Segnalibro, Torino, 1992.
- Aree di devianza, Il Segnalibro, Torino, 1992.
- La pena del non lavoro, (ed) F. Angeli, Milano, 1993.
- Religiosità del nuovo areopago, F. Angeli, Milano, 1994.
- La sfida infinita, with Massimo Introvigne, Edizioni Sciascia, Roma, 1994.
- Sociologia della devianza (with Franco Prina), Edizioni NIS, Roma, 1995.
- Terziario esoterico a Torino, (ed) Edizioni Il Segnalibro, Torino, 1995.
- Adolphe Quételet. Il mito dell'uomo medio, (ed) Edizioni Il Segnalibro, Torino, 1996.
- Forme del pluralismo religioso, Edizioni Il Segnalibro, Torino, 1997.
- Giovani e violenza. Comportamenti collettivi in area metropolitana, Ananke, Torino, 1997.
- Il gigante invisibile. Nuove credenze e minoranze religiose nella provincia di Foggia, (with Massimo Introvigne) Edizioni NED, Foggia, 1997.
- Damanhur. Popolo e comunità, Editrice ElleDiCi, Torino, 1998.
- New Age, Il Mulino, Bologna, 1999.
- Cristiani d'Oriente in Piemont, (with Andrea Cassinasco), L'Harmattan Italia, Torino, 1999.
- New Age, Acento Ed., Madrid, 2002.
- Liberi tutti. Centri sociali e case occupate a Torino, (with Carlo Genova e Renzo Gallini) Ananke, Torino, 2002.
- Società e movimenti, (with Cristopher Cepernich) Edizioni Esselibri Simone, Napoli, 2003.
- Giubileo 2000: non tutte le strade portano a Roma, FrancoAngeli, Milano, 2003.
- Identità e identificazione, (with Pierluigi Zoccatelli), Sciascia Editore, Caltanissetta-Roma, 2005.
- Percorsi di sociologia dei lifestyles, (with Carlo Genova), ilSegnalibro, Torino 2008.
- I lifestyles nella partecipazione religiosa, (with Carlo Genova), ilSegnalibro, Torino 2008.
- Religione dei volti, Edizioni loSpettatore, Asti, 2009.
- La buona morte, (ed), Morcelliana, Brescia, 2009.
- La società delle pratiche orizzontali, (with Carlo Genova), Libri Emil, Bologna, 2010.
- Nessun idolo. Cultura contemporanea e spiritualità cristiana, (ed) Glossa, Milano, 2010.
- L'età delle pratiche orizzontali, (with Carlo Genova), I libri EMIL, Bologna, 2010.
- Ai piedi dei grandi maestri, (ed) Edizioni loSpettatore, Asti, 2010.
- Cinesi a Torino, (with C. Genova, M. Introvigne, R. Ricucci, P. Zoccatelli) Il Mulino, Bologna, 2010.
- Sociologia dei lifestyles (with Carlo Genova), Carocci, Roma, 2011.
- Lifestyle and Religion, in Annual Review of the Sociology of Religion, n. 1, 2010, Brill.
- Vocation as a personal choice, in Giuseppe Giordan, (ed), Vocation and Social Context, Brill, Leiden - Boston, 2007.
- Conversion as a New Lifestyle: An Exploratory Study of Soka Gakkai in Italy, in Giuseppe Giordan (ed), Conversion in the Age of Pluralism, Brill, Leiden - Boston, 2009.
- Religious Lifestyles, in Giuseppe Giordan, William H. Swatos (ed), Religion, Spirituality and Everyday Practice, London - New York, Springer, 2011.
- Annual Review of the Sociology of Religion Volume 3, New Methods in the Sociology of Religion, ed with Ole Preben Riis.
- The Fourth Secularisation: Autonomy of Individual Lifestyles, Routledge, 2019.
