= List of Hindu gurus and sants =

This is a list of religious people in Hinduism, including gurus, sants, monks, yogis, and spiritual masters.

A guru is defined as a "teacher, spiritual guide, [or] godman", by author David Smith. To obtain the title of guru, one must go through a standard initiation process referred to as diksha, in which they receive a mantra, or sacred Sanskrit phrase.

== The list ==
=== A to C ===
- A.C. Bhaktivedanta Swami Prabhupada (1 September 1896 – 14 November 1977)
- Abhinavagupta (c. 950 – 1020)
- Adi Shankara (8th c. CE)
- Advaita Acharya (1434–1539)
- Agastyar (3rd millennium BCE)
- Akka Mahadevi (c.1130 – 1160), Kannada literature
- Akshobhya Tirtha (c. 1282- c. 1365), disciple of Madhvacharya
- Alvar Saints (700–1000)
- Anandamayi Ma (30 April 1896 – 27 August 1982)
- Anasuya Devī, also known as Jillellamudi Amma(28 March 1923 – 12 June 1985)
- Andal (c.767), Tamil literature
- Annamacharya, Telugu literature
- Anukulchandra Chakravarty, also known as Sree Sree Thakur (1888–1969)
- Arunagirinathar (15th century A.D.)
- Asaram Bapu (born 1941)
- Atmananda Krishna Menon(8 December 1883 – 14 May 1959)
- Avvaiyar (c. 1st and 2nd century AD), Tamil literature
- Ayya Vaikundar (1809–1851)
- Atri (Vedic times)
- Baba Hari Dass (26 March 1923 – 25 September 2018)
- Baba Mast Nath (born 1764)
- Bahinabai (1628–1700), Marathi literature
- Bamakhepa, or Bamakhyapa/ Bamdev Bhairav (1837 – 1911)
- Basava (1105 CE–1167 CE)
- Bhadase Sagan Maraj (1920–1971), Indo-Trinidadian Hindu leader and politician, founded the Sanatan Dharma Maha Sabha
- Bhagat Dhanna (born 1415)
- Bhagatji Maharaj (20 March 1829 – 7 November 1897)
- Bhagawan Nityananda (November or December 1897 – 8 August 1961)
- Bhakti Charu Swami (17 September 1945 – 4 July 2020)
- Bhakti Tirtha Swami (25 February 1950 – 27 June 2005)
- Bhaktisiddhanta Sarasvati (6 February 1874 – 1 January 1937)
- Bhaktivinoda Thakur (2 September 1838 – 23 June 1914)
- Bharathi Tirtha (born 11 April 1951, 36th Jagadguru Shankaracharya of Sringeri Sharada Peetham)
- Bhaskararaya (c. 1690–1785)
- Bijoy Krishna Goswami (2 August 1841 – 1899)
- Brahma Chaitanya, also known as Gondavalekar Maharaj (1845–22 December 1913)
- Brahmanand Swami (1772–1832)
- Brahmananda Saraswati (20 December 1868 – 20 May 1953)
- Chaitanya Mahaprabhu (18 February 1486 – 14 June 1534)
- Chandrashekarendra Saraswati (20 May 1894 – 8 January 1994)
- Chandrashekhara Bharati III (1892–1954)
- Chattampi Swamikal (c. 1853–1924)
- Chaturbhuj Sahay (3 November 1883 – 24 September 1957)
- Chinmayananda Saraswati (8 May 1916 – 3 August 1993)
- Chokhamela (14th century)

=== D to F ===
- Dada Bhagwan, founder of Akram Vignan (7 Novembery 1908 – 2 January 1988)
- Damodardev (c. 1488 – c. 1598)
- Dayananda Saraswati (Ärsha Vidya) (15 August 1930 – 24 September 2015)
- Dayananda Saraswati, founder of Arya Samaj (12 February 1824 – 30 October 1883)
- Dhyanyogi Madhusudandas (1878–1994)
- Dhirendra Krishna Shastri
- Devraha Baba
- Dnyaneshwar (1275–1296)
- Drona (Mahabharat era)
- Eknath (1533–1599)
- Eknath Easwaran (1910–1999)

=== G to I ===
- Gagangiri Maharaj (1906 – 4 February 2008)
- Gajanan Maharaj (c. mid-19th century)
- Ganapati Muni (c. 1878–c.1936)
- Gambhirnath (death 1917)
- Garib Das (1717–1778)
- Gauḍapāda (Gauḍapādācārya), (The Gure of Govindapada)
- Gaurakisora Dasa Babaji (1838–1915)
- Gnanananda Giri (c. early 19th century)
- Gokulanatha (1551–1641) (Author of Chaurasi and Dou Sau Bavan Vaishnavo Ki Varta)
- Gopala Dasa (1721–1769
- Gopala Bhatta Goswami (1503–1578)
- Gopalanand Swami (1781–1852)
- Gopi Krishna (yogi) (1903–1984)
- Gora Kumbhar (c. 1267–c.1317)
- Gorakhnath (c. 10th or 11th

century)

- Govindapada, (Govinda Bhagavatpada) (The Guru of Adi Shankara)
- Gulabrao Maharaj (6 July 1881 – 20 September 1915 )
- Gunatitanand Swami (17 October 1785 – 11 October 1867)
- Guru Jambheshwar (1451–1536)
- Gurumayi Chidvilasananda (born 24 June 1955)
- Hans Ji Maharaj (8 November 1900 – 18 July 1966)
- Haridasa Thakur (born 1451 or 1450)
- Hariharananda Giri (Paramahamsa Hariharananda) (27 May 1907 – 3 December 2002)
- Hathiram Bhavaji
- Isaignaniyar (c. 7th century), Tamil literature

=== J to L ===
- Jagannatha Dasa (c. 1490–1550] Odia Vaishnav poet and devotee
- Jagannatha Dasa (Kannada poet)
- Jaggi Vasudev (born 3 September 1957)
- Jalaram Bapa (4 November 1799 23 February 1881)
- Janabai (c. 13th century), Marathi literature
- Jayadeva (CE 1170), Indian Sanskrit poet and devotee
- Jayatirtha (1345–1388)
- Jiva Goswami (c. 1513–1598)
- Kabir (c. 15th century), Indian saint and mystic
- Kalki Bhagwan (born 1949)
- Kamlesh D. Patel, also known as Daaji (born 28 September 1965)
- Kanakadasa (1509–1609)
- Kanhopatra (c. 15th century), Marathi literature
- Karaikkal Ammaiyar (c. 6th century), Tamil literature
- Khaptad Baba
- Khatkhate Baba (1859–1930)
- Kripa (Kripacharya), (Mahabharata era)
- Kirpal Singh (c. 1894–1974) (Sawan Kirpal Ruhani Mission)
- Kirupanandha Variyar (25 August 1906 – 7 November 1993)
- Kripalu Maharaj (5 October 1922 – 15 November 2013)
- Krishna Prem (1898–1965)
- Krishnadasa Kaviraja (born 1496)
- Krishnananda Saraswati (25 April 1922 – 23 November 2001)
- Lahiri Mahasaya (Shyamacharan Lahiri) (30 September 1828 – 26 September 1895)
- Lakshman Joo (9 May 1907 – 27 September 1991), modern scholar of Kashmiri Shaivism
- Lakshmanananda Saraswati (1926 – 23 August 2008)
- Lalleshwari (c.1320 – 1392), Kashmiri literature

=== M to O ===
- Madhavdev (c. 1489 – c. 1596)
- Madhvacharya (c. 1238 – 1317)
- Mahant Swami Maharaj (born 13 September 1933)
- Maharishi Mahesh Yogi (12 January 1918 – 5 February 2008)
- Mahavatar Babaji (mid-19th – mid-20th century)
- Mangayarkkarasiyar (c. 7th century), Tamil literature
- Manik Prabhu
- Master C. V. V. (4 August 1868 – 12 May 1922)
- Mata Amritanandamayi (born 27 September 1953)
- Matsyendranath (c. 10th century)
- Meera (c. 1498 – c. 1547), Hindi literature
- Meher Baba (25 February 1894 – 31 January 1969)
- Mehi (28 April 1885 – 8 June 1986)
- Mirra Alfassa (21 February 1878 – 17 November 1973)
- Morari Bapu (born 25 September 1946)
- Mother Meera (born 26 December 1960)
- Muktabai (c.1279 – 1297), Marathi literature
- Muktanand Swami (1758–1830)
- Muktananda (16 May 1908 – 2 October 1982)
- Murugan Chillayah (born 22 November 1978)
- Muthuswami Dikshitar (24 March 1776 – 21 October 1835)
- Namdev (c. 1270 – c. 1350)
- Narahari Tirtha
- Narasimha Saraswati(1378–1459)
- Narayan Maharaj (20 May 1885 – 3 September 1945)
- Narayana Guru, writer of Daiva Dasakam (c. 1854 – 1928)
- Narayanprasaddasji Swami (14 January 1921 – 30 January 2018), also known as Tapomurti Shastri Swami (Gujarati: તપોમૂર્તિ શાસ્ત્રી સ્વામી)
- Narottama Dasa (born 1466)
- Narsinh Mehta (1414–1481), also known as Narsi Mehta or Narsi Bhagat
- Nayakanahatti Thipperudra Swamy (c. 15th–c. 16th century), also known as Nayakanahatti Thippeswamy
- Nayanmars Saints (700–1000)
- Neem Karoli Baba (c. late 19th or early 20th century – 11 September 1973)
- Nigamananda Paramahansa (18 August 1880 – 29 November 1935)
- Nimbarka (c. 7th century or earlier)
- Niranjanananda (c. 1862 – 9 May 1904)
- Nirmala Srivastava, also known as Shri Mataji Nirmala Devi (21 March 1923 – 23 February 2011)
- Nisargadatta Maharaj(17 April 1897 – 8 September 1981)
- Nishkulanand Swami (1766–1848)
- Nischalananda Saraswati (born 30 June 1943 145th Jagadguru Shankaracharya of Govardhan Math)
- Nityananda Prabhu (born 1474)
- Om Swami (born 1979)

=== P to R ===
- Padmanabha Tirtha
- Panth Maharaj (3 September 1855 – 16 October 1905)
- Paramahansa Yogananda (5 January 1893 – 7 March 1952)
- Parthasarathi Rajagopalachari, also known as chariji (24 July 1927 – 20 December 2014)
- Pattinathar (c. 10th or 14th century AD)
- Pavhari Baba (birth unknown – 1898)
- Potuluri Virabrahmendra Swami (c. 17th century)
- Prabhat Ranjan Sarkar, also known as Shrii Shrii Anandamurti (21 May 1921 – 21 October 1990)
- Pramukh Swami Maharaj (born 7 December 1921 – 13 August 2016)
- Pranavananda, also known as Yugacharya Srimat Swami Pranavananda Ji Maharaj (29 January 1896 – 8 February 1941)
- Pranavanda Saraswati (28 August 1908 – 28 August 1982)
- Prem Rawat, also known as Maharaji, Guru Maharaj Ji, and Balyogeshwar (born 10 December 1957)
- Premanand Ji Maharaj, Radhavallabh Sampradaya, Vrindavan (born 30 March 1969)
- Purandara Dasa (c. 1484 – c. 1565)
- Puran Puri (born 1742)
- Rambhadracharya (born 14 January 1950)
- Ramdas Kathiababa (early 24 July 1800 – 8 February 1909)
- Ramdev Pir (1352–1385 AD)
- Radhanath Swami (born 7 December 1950)
- Raghavendra Swami (1595 – 1671)
- Raghunatha Bhatta Goswami (1505–1579)
- Rajinder Singh (spiritual master) (20 September 1946) (Sawan Kirpal Ruhani Mission) (Founder of Science of Spirituality)
- Rakeshprasad (born 23 July 1966)
- Rakesh Jhaveri (born 26 Sep 1966)
- Raghuttama Tirtha (1537 – 1596)
- Ram Chandra (Babuji) (30 April 1899 – 19 April 1983)
- Ram Chandra (Lalaji) (02 February 1873 – 14 August 1931)
- Ram Thakur (2 February 1860 – 1 May 1949)
- Rama Tirtha (22 October 1873 – 27 October 1906)
- Ramakrishna (18 February 1836 – 16 August 1886)
- Ramalinga Swamigal (5 October 1823, disappeared on 30 January 1874), also known as Vallalar
- Ramana Maharshi (30 December 1879 – 14 April 1950)
- Ramanuja (c. 1077 – c. 1157)
- Ramprasad Sen (c. 1718 or c. 1723 – c. 1775)
- Ravidas (1398–1540)
- Rupa Goswami (1489–1564)

=== S to U ===
- Siyaram Baba(1914 – 11 December 2024)
- Sant Rampal Ji Maharaj (1951–present)
- Sahadeo Tiwari (1892–1972)
- Sai Baba of Shirdi (1838–1918)
- Samarth Ramdas (1608–1681)
- Samyamindra Thirtha
- Sanatana Goswami (1488–1558)
- Sankardev (c. 1449 – c. 1568)
- Sant Charandas (1703–1782)
- Sant Nirmala (c. 14th century), Marathi literature
- Sant Soyarabai (c. 14th century), Marathi literature
- Sarada Devi (22 December 1853 – 20 July 1920)
- Satchidananda Saraswati (22 December 1914 – 19 August 2002)
- Sathya Sai Baba (23 November 1926 – 24 April 2011)
- Satnarayan Maharaj (born 1931), Indo-Trinidadian Hindu leader and son-in-law of Bhadase Sagan Maraj
- Satsvarupa dasa Goswami (born 6 December 1939)
- Satyadhyana Tirtha
- Satyasandha Tirtha Dvaita philosopher
- Satyanatha Tirtha
- Satyavrata Tirtha
- Satyapriya Tirtha
- Satyanidhi Tirtha
- Satyasandha Tirtha
- Satyadharma Tirtha
- Satya Narayan Goenka (30 January 1924 – 29 September 2013)
- Satyananda Saraswati (25 December 1923 – 5 December 2009)
- Satyapramoda Tirtha (1918–1997)
- Satyatma Tirtha (born 1973)
- Shaunaka
- Seshadri Swamigal (22 January 1870 – 4 January 1929)
- Shastriji Maharaj (31 January 1865 – 10 May 1951)
- Shivabalayogi (24 January 1935 – 28 March 1994)
- Shreedhar Swami (7 December 1908 – 19 April 1973)
- Shrimad Rajchandra (11 November 1867 – 9 April 1901)
- Shripad Shri Vallabha
- Shriram Sharma Acharya (20 September 1911 – 2 June 1990)
- Shrivatsa Goswami (27 October 1950 – present
- Shyama Shastri (26 April 1762 – 6 February 1982)
- Sitaramdas Omkarnath (17 February 1892 – 6 December 1827)
- Sivananda Saraswati (8 September 1887 – 14 July 1963)
- Sivaya Subramuniyaswami (5 January 1927 – 12 November 2001)
- Soham Swami (birth unknown – 1918)
- Sopan (c. 13th century)
- Sri Aurobindo (15 August 1872 – 5 December 1950)
- Sripadaraja (c. 1422–1480)
- Sri Chinmoy (27 August 1931 – 11 October 2007)
- Sri Madhukarnath (born 06 November 1948)
- Sri Sri Ravi Shankar (born 1956)
- Sudhanshu Ji Maharaj (born May 1955)
- Surdas (c. late 15th-century)
- Swami Abhedananda (2 October 1866 – 8 September 1939)
- Swami Avdheshanand Giri
- Swami Bhoomananda Tirtha (born 13 May 1933)
- Swami Chidbhavananda (11 March 1898 – 16 November 1985)
- Swami Janakananda (born 13 June 1939)
- Swami Keshwanand Satyarthi (born 5 September 1943) (Paramhans Satyarthi Mission, Advait Mat )
- Swami Narayan Gautam Khatri (born 1858)
- Swami Nithyananda (born 1 January 1978 or 13 March 1977)
- Swami Prakashanand Saraswati (born 15 January 1929 – )
- Swami Purnachaitanya (born 1984)
- Swami Sharnanandji (birth unknown – 1974)
- Swami Sri Yukteswar Giri (1855–1936)
- Swami Rama (1925–1996)
- Swami Ramanand (c. 1738 – c. 1802)
- Swami Ramdas (10 April 1884 – 25 July 1963)
- Swami Samarth
- Swami Vivekananda (12 January 1863 – 4 July 1902)
- Swaminarayan (3 April 1781 – 1 June 1830)
- Swarupanand (1 February 1884 – 9 April 1936), part of Advait Mat lineage
- Swarupananda (8 July 1871 – 27 June 1906)
- Tapovan Maharaj(3 December 1889 – 16 January 1957)
- Tarigonda Vengamamba, Telugu literature
- Trailanga (1607 – 1887)
- Tukaram (c. 1608 – 1649)
- Tulsidas (1532 – 1623), also known as Goswami Tulsidas
- Turiyananda(3 January 1863 – 21 July 1922)
- Tyagaraja (4 May 1767 – 6 January 1847)
- Upasni Maharaj (15 May 1870 – 24 December 1941)
- Uppaluri Gopala Krishnamurti (9 July 1918 – 22 March 2007)
- Utpaladeva (ca. 900–950), teacher of Kashmiri Shaivism

=== V to X ===
- Vadiraja Tirtha (1480–1600)
- Vallabha (1479 – 1531)
- Valmiki (Ramayana)
- Vasistha (Rig Veda)
- Vasugupta (~ 800–850 CE), author of the Shiva Sutras in Kashmiri Shaivism
- Vedanta Desika, Sri Vaishnava Philosopher and Guru (c. 1268 – c. 1369)
- Vethathiri Maharishi (1911–2006) Indian yoga guru, philosopher and spiritual leader
- Vidyadheesh Teertha Swamiji
- Vidyaranya (c. 1268 – c. 1386)
- Vijayadasaru (1682–1755)
- Vijayindra Tirtha ( The guru of guru of Raghavendra Swami)
- Vishvamitra (The guru of Lord Rama)
- Vishwananda (13 June 1980)
- Vishwesha Tirtha (1931 – 2019)
- Vyasa (Veda Vyasa, Krishna Dvaipayana)
- Vyasatirtha (c. 1460 – 1539)

=== Y to Z ===
- Yogaswami (1872 – March 1964)
- Yogi Ramsuratkumar (1 December 1918 – 20 February 2001)
- Yogiji Maharaj (23 May 1892 – 23 January 1971)
- Yukteswar Giri (10 May 1855 – 9 March 1936)

== See also ==
- Dalit saints of Hinduism – Hindu Dalit saints
- List of founders of religious traditions
- List of Hindus
- Mahacharya – Honorific title used for distinguished teachers in Hindu traditions.
- Modern yoga gurus – People widely acknowledged to be gurus of modern yoga
