= Anandpuri =

Sri Swami Anandpuri ji Maharaj (1782–1872) is known as the founder of the Advait Mat tradition. He was initiated by Totapuri.

When he was 90 years of age, He reportedly wrote in Urdu on a piece of paper: "Accept Paramhansa Ram Yaad" referring to Dayal Ji, the one that went to become the "First Master" of Advait Mat.
