= Satyarthi =

Satyarthi is an Indian surname that may refer to

- Devendra Satyarthi (1908–2003), Indian folklorist and writer of Hindi, Urdu and Punjabi literature
- Kailash Satyarthi (born 1954), Indian children's rights and education advocate
- Swami Keshwanand Satyarthi (born 1943), Indian Guru of Paramhans Satyarthi Mission (Shri Nangli Sahib )
