= Naikanahatti =

Nayakanahatty
- village
- Location in Karnataka, India Nayakanahatty (India)
- Coordinates: 14.32°N 76.64°E
- Country: India
- State: Karnataka
- District: Chitradurga
- Talukas: Challakere

Population (2022)
  - Total: 5,043

Languages
  - Official: Kannada
- Time zone: UTC+5:30 (IST)

Nayakanahatti or Nayakanahatty is a small village in the southern state of Karnataka, India. It is located in the Challakere taluk of Chitradurga district in Karnataka. The town of Nayakanahatty is also famous for the temple of Nayakanahatti Thipperudra Swamy.

== Demographics ==
As of the 2001 India Census, Naikanahatti had a population of 2,501 with the population being 6,580 male and 2,542 female.

== See also ==
- Chitradurga
- Districts of Karnataka
