= Dalit saints of Hinduism =

Hindu Dalit saints

Dalit is an ancient designation for a group of indigenous Indian people. Several influential Hindu saints, though, were members of this group. Though there has also many historical Vedic period saints, whose descendants are now considered as Dalits. Many of the saints have been classified as Shudra or Avarna, because there was no concept of Dalits or Harijan.

== List ==
=== Vedic period ===
- Matanga, teacher of Shabari.

=== Ancient period ===
- Avvaiyar, royal saint of Chera dynasty.
- Nandanar (Nalai Povar), one of the Nayanars.

=== Medieval period ===
- Chokhamela, one of the first Dalit poets in India and wrote many Abhangas.
- Ghasidas, notable saint of Satnami sect.
- Namdev, saint from Varkari tradition.
- Ravidas, founder of Ravidassia religion.

=== Modern period ===
- Mata Amritanandamayi
- Bhagu, notable Hindu saint and wrote many Abhangas devoted to Viṭhal.
- Parsuram, founder of Ramnami Samaj.

== See also ==
- List of Dalits
