= Swami Keshwanand Satyarthi =

Indian guru (born 1943)

Shri Swami Keshwanand Satyarthi Ji Maharaj
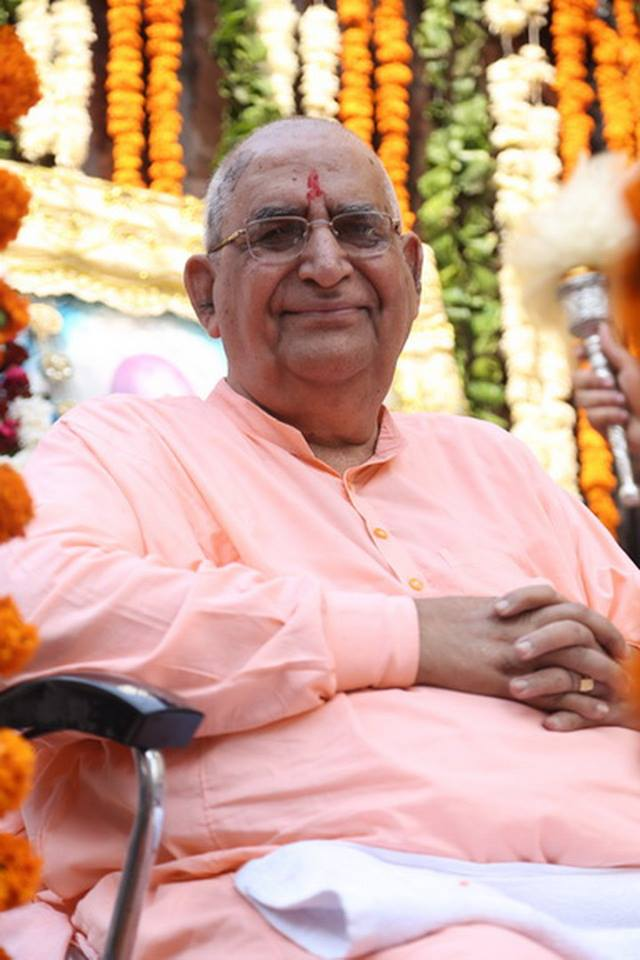
- Born: 5 September 1943
- Died: 25 June 2020 (aged 76)
- Website: www.satyarthiji.com

Shri Swami Keshwanand Satyarthi Ji Maharaj (5 September 1943 - 25 June 2020) was an Indian guru of Shri Nangli Sahib lineage. The spiritual institution Paramhans Satyarthi Mission was led and governed by him. In 1985, Shri Paramhans Swami Ramanand Satyarthi Ji Maharaj anointed him as his spiritual successor and the patron saint of the Paramhans Satyarthi Mission. Swami Keshwanand Satyarthi Ji Maharaj travelled around the world and preached about spirituality and enlightenment. Swami Ramanand Satyarthi Trust, Shri Satyarthi High School, Shri Satyarthi Sevadal and Shri Satyarthi Sandesh Magazine were also administered under his guidance.

== Life ==
He was born on 5 September 1943, in a religious family and was named as Shri Khairati Lal Bhardwaj. His father, Pandit Khushiram Bhardwaj was a devotee of Lord Krishna and a scholar of Sanskrit, Astrology, Vedanta, Shastras and Upanishads. Pandit Khushiram Bhardwaj Ji became a disciple of Swami Swarupanand Ji Maharaj, adopted a life of renunciation (Sanyas) and was later famed as Shri Rajyogacharya Paramhans Swami Ramanand Satyarthi ji Maharaj.

Swami Keshwanand Satyarthi Ji Maharaj acquired knowledge of Rajyoga from Shri Swami Ramanand Satyarthi ji Maharaj. By the age of ten years, he used to go into state of super-consciousness (Samadhi) with ease. He continued his practices of Raj Yoga with his schooling and graduation. He completed his degree of M.A. and married a well-read girl hailing from a cultured family.

Shri Swami Advaitanand Ji Maharaj (1846-1919) the "First Spiritual Master" of the Advait Mat, initiated Shri 1008 Paramhans Swami Swarupanand Ji Maharaj (also known as Shri Nangli Nivasi Bhagwan Ji) in the early 1900s. Swami Swarupanand Ji Maharaj is considered a super-eminent spiritual master in India. Thousands of people visit Shri Nangli Sahib where resides the Samadhi temple of Shri Swami Swarupanand Ji Maharaj. He had initiated more than a thousand Mahatmas and Baijis as disciples. In 1930, Shri Swami Swarupanand Maharaj Ji permitted Shri Swami Ramanand Satyarthi Ji Maharaj to give Updesh to devotees acknowledging his spiritual state. Accordingly, Shri Swami Ramanand Satyarthi Ji Maharaj started preaching in Saalam Ashram in West Punjab (now in Pakistan). Shri Paramhans Swami Ramanand Satyarthi Ji Maharaj laid the foundation of Raj Yog Mandir in Delhi on the day of Kartik Poornima in 1964. He also founded the spiritual institution Paramhans Satyarthi Mission.

On 2 July 1985 (the day of Vyas Pooja), Shri Swami Ramanand Satyarthi Ji Maharaj declared Shri Khairati Lal Bhardwaj as his spiritual successor and the patron saint of Paramhans Satyarthi Mission and named him as Shri Swami Keshwanand Satyarthi Ji Maharaj.

Shri Swami Keshwanand Satyarthi Ji Maharaj and his wife (Sant Maa Divyanand Satyarthi Ji) took sanyaas and vowed to publicize the supreme knowledge of Paramhans tradition on 8 January 1995 at Shri Satyarthi Samadhi Mandir, Shri Nangli Sahib, Meerut. Swami Keshwanand Satyarthi Ji Maharaj founded various Satyarthi Dhams (Ashrams) at New Delhi, Haridwar, Lucknow, Chhatarpur, etc. Swami Keshwanand Satyarthi Ji Maharaj organised Gyan-Yagyas at different places and camps for spiritual and moral understanding every year at Rajyog Mandir, New Delhi.

== Primary teachings ==
The primary teachings of Shri Swami Keshwanand Satyarthi Ji Maharaj are Bhakti, Sewa (Service), Prem (love) and Rāja yoga (meditation). The spiritual institution (Paramhans Satyarthi Mission) led by Shri Swami Keshwanand Satyarthi Ji Maharaj believes in the principle of Vasudev Kutumbkam. The symbol of the mission is Hans or the swan bird on the lotus flower. "Satya" (truth) is the methodology of the mission. Shri Swami Keshwanand Satyarthi Ji Maharaj preached the concept and relevance of Advaita Vedanta, self-realization (Aatm Gyan) and the practices of Dhyana and meditation. Advait refers to the idea that the soul (Atman) is the same as the highest metaphysical reality (Brahman). Advaita Vedanta emphasizes the idea that moksha is achievable in this life in contrast to Indian philosophies that emphasize moksha after death. Advaita Vedanta is one of the most studied and most influential schools of classical Indian thought. Advaita philosophy is non-dualistic.

=== Raj Yoga ===
Raj yoga is variously referred to as "Royal Yoga", "Sahaj Marg", "Surat Shabd Yog", 'Sahaj Yog'. Raj yoga refers to the goal of yoga (which is samadhi). Raja Yoga meditation is an inwardly oriented practice. Shri Swami Keshwanand Satyarthi Ji Maharaj initiated disciples on the meditation of the Holy Name (mantra). This mantra is given to the devotees as Updesh (teaching). It is known to make the person’s life free of all hassles, to show and guide him in the right direction. Advanced practices of Raja Yoga are known as Sehaj Samadhi Vigyan. He has written several books on Rajyog, Sewa, Satya, etc.

=== Sewa ===
In his view, Sewa is the best way of practicing Bhakti. It could be in any way, by going to temples and physically contributing to the activities happening there, by remembering the Lord in our hearts and doing Pooja (worship) at home, or by donating to the funds meant for spiritual uplifment of the masses.

=== Bhakti ===
Bhakti means devotion. Bhakti yoga means to surrender to the supremacy of the Lord / Master in a child-like innocence. The goal of the one who practices Bhakti yoga is to dwell in a state of constant remembrance of his beloved Lord and see the world as a manifestation of God.
