= Arambhada =

- Census town
- Location in Gujarat, India Arambhada (India)
- Coordinates: 22.45588°N 69.02635°E
- Country: India
- State: Gujarat
- District: Jamnagar

Population (2001)
  - Total: 15,008

Languages
  - Official: Gujarati, Hindi
- Time zone: UTC+5:30 (IST)
- PIN: 361345
- Vehicle registration: GJ
- Website: gujaratindia.com

Arambhada is a census town in Jamnagar district in the Indian state of Gujarat. It's in the princely state of Vadhel.

== Demographics ==
As of the 2001 India census, Arambhada had a population of 15,008. Males constitute 51% of the population and females 49%. Arambhada has an average literacy rate of 53%, lower than the national average of 59.5%; with 61% of the males and 39% of females literate. 16% of the population is under 6 years of age. Arambhda has become part of Okha Nagar Palika.

== Notable people ==
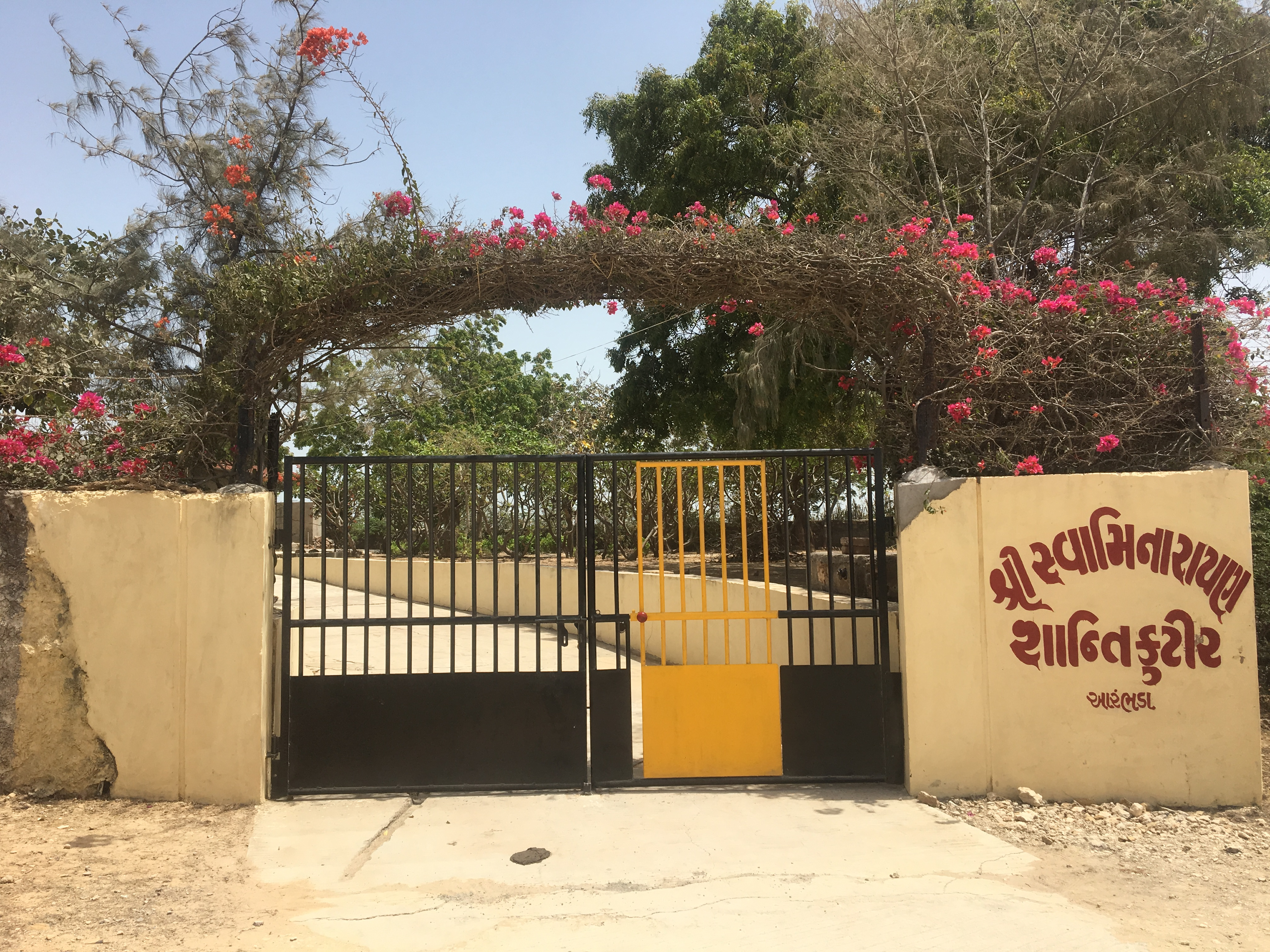
Swami's Shanti Kutir in Arambhada, Gujarat

Tapomurti Sadguru Shastri Shri Narayanprasaddasji Swami, A well known Swami of Swaminarayan Sampraday had been living in this village at his kutir (house) called Shanti Kutir for the last 30 years of his life.
