= Gokarna Math =

Spiritual organisation of Goud Saraswat Brahmins

- Shree Samsthan Gokarn Partagali Jeevottam Math
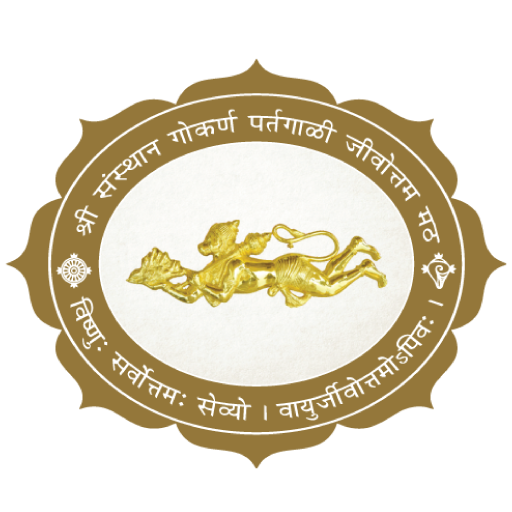
- Emblem

- Location in Goa
- Named after: Shrimat Jeevottam Tirth
- Predecessor: Shrimad Vidyadhiraj Teerth Swamiji
- Founder: Narayana Teertha
- Headquarters: Partagal, Poinginim, Canacona
- Coordinates: 14.992989°N 74.107327°E
- Region served: Konkan belt
- Present Mathadipathi: Shrimad Vidyadheesh Teerth Swamiji
- Website: http://partagalimath.org

Shree Samsthana Gokarn Partagali Jeevottam Math (श्री संस्थान गोकर्ण पर्तगाळी जीवोत्तम मठ) or Partagali Math ( also known as Gokarna Matha, Partagali Jivottama Math) is the first Gaud Saraswat Mathas of the Dvaita order, a system established by Jagadguru Madhvacharya in the 13th century AD. This matha also called Partagali Jivottama and is headquartered in Partagali, a small town in South Goa, on the banks of the river Kushavati.

It is also said that this matha was formed after it split away from Palimar at Udupi initiated by Shimad Ananda Theertharu (Madhvacharya).

The first pontiff of the matha was Narayanatirtha. Shri Narayana Theertharu was a great scholar of the Dvaita order and earned the name "Shri Paada Wodayaru", for which he is still known today. The math became well known as Jivottama Matha after the third pontiff, Jivottama Tirthar. The deity worshiped by the institution is Shri Veera MoolaRama devaru and Shri Veeravittala devaru

During the late 1950s, Shri Dwarakanatha Theertharu established several educational institutions and republished several seminal works.

This math was also a victim of Portuguese Christian missionary activities that drove the original establishment from Madgao to Bhatkal in Karnataka and Karwar District in Karnataka.

== History ==
In the true sense, establishment of Shree Mutt renowned as the Shree Samsthan Gokarn Partagali Jeevottam Mutt coincidentally took place in the Himalayas at Badrikashram on Chaitra Shukla 2, saka 1397 (1475 A.D.)

Shree Madhvacharya had established Ashtamuttas (eight mutts) at Udupi to disseminate the Dvaita philosophy of the Madhva sect. Of these eight, one was the Palimaru Math. The Saraswat community spread along the Western Coast of India, following the philosophy of the Vaishnava sect had accepted the spiritual guidance of this Palimaru Math.

The tenth Acharya of the Palimaru Math Shree Ramchandra Teerth, while on a pilgrimage to the Himalayas accompanied by his entourage, was taken seriously ill. The place being inaccessible and remote from Udupi, it was not possible to establish any contact with the headquarters of the Mutt at Udupi. Fearing that the lineage of the Acharyas of the Mutt may be severed in case he breathes his last at the feet of Lord Narayan, and the tradition of the Mutt would be curtailed, as an alternative arrangement he ritually conferred the discipleship on an eligible Saraswat bhrahmachari (celibate bachelor). Having thus initiated him into the Mutt tradition by giving diksha and having bestowed the name of Shree Narayan Teerth on him, the Guruswami advised him to return to Udupi after duly completing his pilgrimage.

After being duly initiated into renunciation, Shree Narayan Teerth resolved to complete his pilgrimage to the sacred spots and shrines of North India. Thus moving from places of pilgrimage such as Kurukshetra and Brahmavarta to Brahmahruda, he finally arrived at the world-renowned pilgrim centre of Varanasi. This ancient land of Vaishnavas is considered as the abode of rest of Lord Madhava.

The holy month of Kartik had drawn near and the Swamiji was aware of the extraordinary significance of the sacred dip at the Panchaganga ghat at this auspicious time. In fact, it has been mentioned in the Ramayana that Lord Ram had made a year-long sojourn at Varanasi on the way to his vanavas (disbandment).

It so happened that, during the very month of Kartik, the princess of Kashi (Varanasi), along with her companions arrived at the ghat for the gangasnaan (holy bath). As had been her practice, she kept her ornaments on the bank over the clothes and dipped into the water. But due to the extreme cold, she began to shiver and quickly rushing for dry clothes on the shore and pulled them on.

Having completed their bath, as the entire troupe was about to return to the palace, it was discovered that the diamond studded bangle of the princess was lost. But where could it go? Who could have dared to steal the bangle of the princess? An intense search was launched but to no avail.

An hermit was seen engaged in japa anushtthan (ritual of chant-worship) at one corner of the ghat. Many had seen this alien sannyasin (ascetic) there. Although there was a hue and cry over the lost ornament of the princess, it had not disturbed the Concentration of the hermit engrossed in his worship. However, the soldiers disturbed his meditation and accosted him with their suspicion. His reply was spontaneous and forthright:

"We are ascetics who have renounced the world. What enticement could wealth and ornaments hold for the like of us? When we don't even covet a square meal a day, why would we turn traitors to our own belief of non-accumulation and astheya vrata (nonsteaking) ?"

Although Shree Narayan Teerth was unmoved by the accusation, the soldiers refused to be dissuaded by his candid speech and searched him. But they were crestfallen when they found nothing on his person!

There was no iota of doubt left about the innocence of Shree Narayan Teerth, when the waters of the river receded the bangle was discovered in the shallow riverbed near the bank.

The royal family sought forgiveness of Shree Narayan Teerth. The King of Kashi heard that an innocent sanyasin had been harassed by the royal household. He Was deeply disturbed. He felt that he had to seek personal forgiveness for his high handedness of the royalty. Coming to the Panchaganga ghat, he fell at the feel of Shree Narayan Teerth.

"We are ashamed of what has come to pass. Swamiji may kindly forgive us." The King prayed.

Shree Narayan Teerth replied, "Oh Royal Prince' In your kingdom dharma and religiosity have always been given generous patronage. On this Panchaganga ghat, mother Ganga has turned the corner of her stream to become ishyanyaplava (oriented towards the North-East). We belong to the Gaud Saraswat Brahmin community from the distant land of Aparant, but we are deeply devoted to Mother Ganga in the holy land of Kashi. We desire that more and more people or our community should visit this sacred place to seek the darshan of Mother Ganga and bathe in the holy waters: So we intend to have Mutt premises here. If your Royal Highness takes active interest in this project, it would be a virtuous act of benevolence."

The repentant King of Kashi was much relieved by the words of Shree Narayan Teerth. He helped the construction of a modest of a mutt premises on the very ghat facing Shree Bindu Madhav temple on the banks of the ishyanyaplava Ganga. Having ritually installed the pancha-dhatumaya (quinta-metallic) idol of Shree Laxmi Narayan and having made adequate arrangements for the daily pooja of the deity.

Shree Narayan Teerth Swamiji had established the arch Mutt in the Varanasi region, in the absence of any clear perception regarding the existing and ideal relations between the Mutt and the society. The primary objective behind the establishment of a Mutt would be solely to raise the banner of one's sect in a leading place of pilgrimage and to provide a secure shelter to the pilgrims who venturing forth to remote lands in search of spiritual solace and benediction. [Nonetheless his great venture had also launched a new tradition since] This was the initial Mutt of the Vaishnav sect of Saraswat Brahmins.

Having thus established the first Mutt at Kashi, Shree Narayan Teerth Swamiji returned to Udupi. After some time, the venerable Guru Shree Ramchandra Teerth Swamiji having recovered from his ailment believed to be incurable, also returned to his own Mutt. On seeing Shree Narayan Teerth, the Guruswami was puzzled. He was in two minds. The Dravid Brahmins wanted him to cancel the authority over the Peetha granted to Shree Narayan Teerth; while he himself was aware of the worth of the Batu who had served him so well during his pilgrimage and who having taken diksha as his disciple had planted the banner of his glory in the holy region of Varanasi.

As a way out, the revered Guru made Shree Vidyanidhi Teerth as his successor and advised Shree Narayan Teerth to organize the Saraswat Brahmin community and to create a separate Mutt tradition. Accordingly, Shree Narayan Teerth arrived at Bhatkal and having erected a Mutt premises there began the spread of faith among the Saraswat community in the land of Parashur am.

That was the beginning of the Shree Samsthan Gokarn Partagali Jeevottam Mutt which is considered as the emblem of Saraswat identity and the rallying point for their unification. Devoted for over 530 years to preserve and organize a people forced to be disorganized and committed to serve and energize a community ordained to undergo many an ordeal by fate and compelled to be dispersed by history, the success story of the Mutt also contains the history of the Saraswat community. In this long march ahead, the Mutt has had the rare fortune of having an unhindered lineage of 23 Swamijis. The tiny sapling planted on the banks of lshyanyaplava Ganga by H.H. Shree Narayan Teerth Swamiji and nurtured by this long unbroken tradition has today in the form of the holy Mutt burgeoned like a mighty, banyan tree with its branches spread far and wide.

== Deities ==
Main Deities of Samsthan Gokarna Math are charaprathishta (literally, a moving installation) idols of Lord Shri Veera Vittala and Lord Shri Rama.

== Guru System ==
Gokarna Math follows a Guru system, wherein the head of the Math appoints a shishya, who succeeds the Guru. According to the Math's tradition, the shishya should be unmarried, and is selected at a very young age.

Shri Gokarna Math are followers of the Dvaita school of Vaishnavite philosophy founded by Madhwacharya.

=== Mathadipathi ===
As of 30 July 2026

Current Mathadipathi

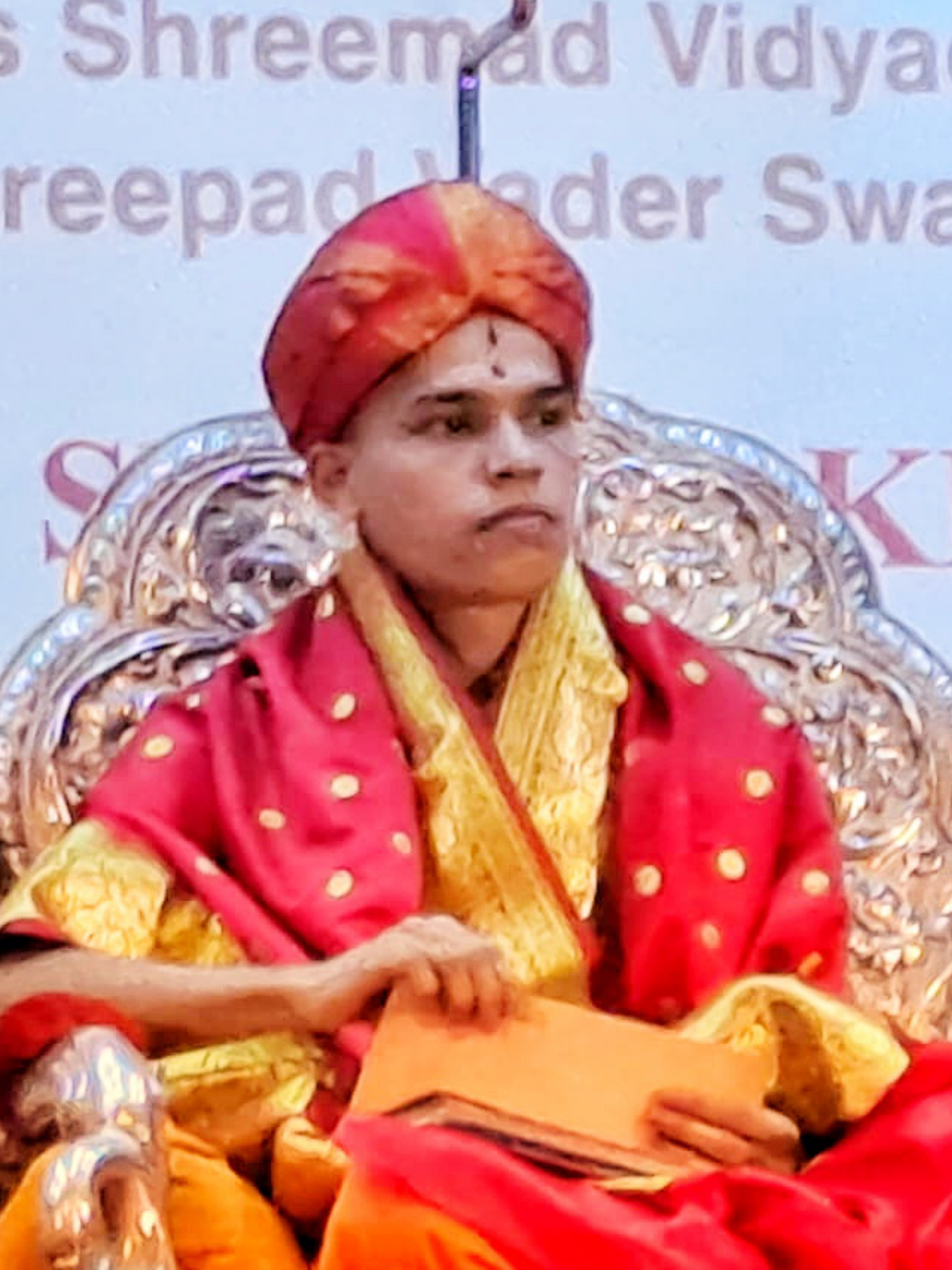
Shrimad Vidyadheesh Teerth Swamiji
(2021–present)
10 October 1995 (age 30)

The spiritual head, or the Mathadipathi is the administrative head of the math and its properties. As a math specific to the Gowd Saraswat Brahmins, the mathadhipathi seldom mingle with members of other communities. The mathadhipathi is not a mere spiritual head of the community. In the past, the mathadhipathi exercised powers over secular matters of the community too. The current Mathadhipathi of Sri Gokarna Math Samsthan is H.H. Vidyadheesha Theertha Swamiji.

== Guru Parampara ==
SL No	Name	Purvashrama Name	Birth (A.D)		Ashrama Sveekar			Vrindavan			Ref
SL No	Name	Purvashrama Name	Date	Place	Date	Age	Place	Date	Age	Place	Ref
1	Shri Narayana Theertha	-	-			-		1517 AD		Bhatkal	
2	Shri Vasudeva Theertha	-	-			-		1518 AD		Pandarpur	
3	Shri Jeevothama Theertha	-	-			-		1588 AD		Bhatkal	
4	Shri Purushothama Theertha	-	-			-		1588 AD		Gokarnam	
5	Shri Anujeevothama Theertha	-	-			-		1637 AD		Dicholi	
6	Shri Ramachandra Theertha	-	-			-		1665 AD		Rivon	
7	Shri Digvijaya Ramachandra Theertha	-	-			-		1669 AD		Ankola	
8	Shri Raghuchandra Theertha	-	-			-		1683 AD		Honavar	
9	Shri Lakshmi Narayana Theertha	Madhav Nayak	-			-		1703 AD		Nasik	
10	Shri Lakshmikantha Theertha		-			-		1707 AD		Honavar	
11	Shri Ramakantha Theertha	-	-			-		1750 AD		Ankola	
12	Shri Kamalakantha Theertha	-	-			-		1758 AD		Gokarnam	
13	Shri Shrikantha Theertha	-	-			-		1772 AD		Partagali	
14	Shri Bhuvijaya Ramachandra Theertha	-	-			-		1803 AD		Ankola	
15	Shri Ramaanatha Theertha	-	-			-		1804 AD		Venkatapur	
16	Shri Lakshminaatha Theertha	-	-			-		1821 AD		Baroda	
17	Shri Ananda Theertha	-	-			-		1828 AD		Partagali	
18	Shri Poornaprajna Theertha	-	-			-		1879 AD		Partagali	
19	Shri Padmanabha Theertha	-	-			-		1892 AD		Partagali	
20	Shri Indirakantha Theertha	-	-			-		1942 AD		Partagali	
21	Shri Kamalanatha Theertha	Vaikunth Narayan Acharya	-			-		1943 AD		Partagali	
22	Shri Dwarakanatha Theertha	Govind Acharya	-			-		25 March 1973		Partagali	
23	Shri Vidyadhiraja Teertha	Raghavendra Acharya	3 Aug 1945	Gangolli	26 Feb 1967	22	Mumbai	19 July 2021	75	Partagali	
24	Shri Vidyadheesh Teertha	Uday Bhat Sharma	10 Oct 1995	Belgaum	9 Feb 2017	22	Partagali	Present Mathadipathi			-

== Samadhi/Vrindavan ==
According to a custom followed in the Gokarna Math, after Swamiji passes away, the mortal remains of the departed Swamiji are buried in the earth after suitably embalming the body with preservatives - salt, camphor, heaps of Tulsi leaves etc. - usually in the Math premises or in temples associated with the Math. Subsequently, a memorial structure is constructed over the site. The entire place is known as the Vrindavana or Samadhi of the Swamiji. Arrangements are made for the daily pujas in the Vrindavana and the Punya Tithi (death anniversary) of the Swamiji is duly celebrated with special pujas and prayers and Abhishekam to the Hanuman idol for his blessing to the Matha Samsthan and its followers.
