= Siyaram Baba =

Indian Hindu saint and supercentenarian (1914–2024)

Hindu saint Siyaram Baba

Personal life
- Born: Siyaram Guttal, British India
- Died: 11 December 2024 Kasrawad, Madhya Pradesh, India

Religious life
- Religion: Hinduism

Siyaram Baba (died 11 December 2024) was an Indian Hindu saint and a supercentenarian. Though his official age was disputed, estimates ranged from 80 to 130 years old. He was from Bhatyan Ashram, located on the banks of the Narmada River in Khargone district, Madhya Pradesh. He died on 11 December 2024 in Khargone.

== Life and teachings ==
Siyaram Baba was a devout follower of Lord Hanuman and was known for his deep spiritual connection. He was a simple saint who lived on the banks of the Narmada River in the Bhatyan Ashram. He was known for his austere lifestyle, often wearing minimal clothing and withstanding extreme weather conditions.

He was deeply knowledgeable about Hindu scriptures and would continuously recite the Ramcharitmanas. He accepted only ₹10 donations from devotees, which were used to develop religious institutions and temples.

== Death ==
Siyaram Baba had been suffering from pneumonia for ten days before his passing. He initially sought treatment at a private hospital in Sanawad but later requested to return to his ashram, where he continued to receive care from doctors at the district hospital. He died on December 11, 2024.

His funeral took place in Teli Bhattayan village, Khargone, on the banks of the Narmada River. The ceremony was attended by thousands of devotees, and sadhus and saints performed the last rites. The funeral, held on Wednesday, was a public event, with Madhya Pradesh Chief Minister Mohan Yadav also scheduled to visit and pay his respects.
