= Narayanprasaddasji Swami =

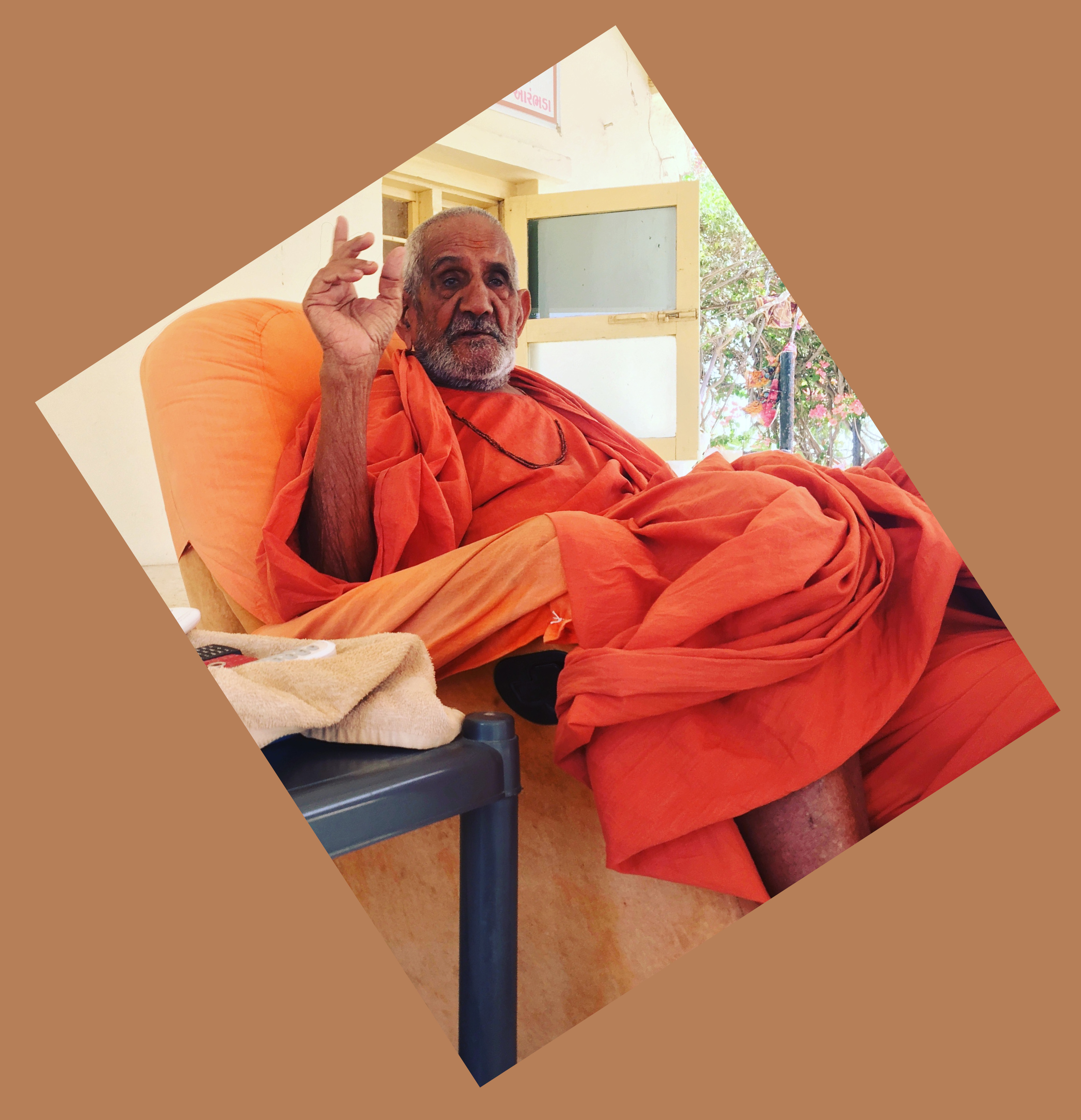

Personal life
- Born: Girdhar Premjibhai Radadiya; January 14, 1921 Saurashtra, Kathiawar Agency, British India
- Died: January 30, 2018 (age 97) Jamnagar, Gujarat, India
- Notable work: Gyan Vilash
- Known for: Tapas, Sanskritacharya, Kathaas
- Honors: Shastri,

Religious life
- Religion: Hinduism
- Sect: Swaminarayan Sampraday

Religious career
- Teacher: Gopaljivandasji Swami
- Disciples: Govindprasaddasji Swami

Narayanprasaddasji Swami (born Girdhar Radadiya, January 14, 1921 – January 30, 2018), also known as Tapomurti Shastri Swami and Guruji by his devotees, was one of the most noted swamis of the Swaminarayan Sampraday. He has been called one of the most legendary Hindu saints of India.

== Early life ==
Shastri Swami Narayanprasaddasji was born on 14 January 1921, the auspicious day of the Hindu Festival Makar Sankranti, in the Vaishnav - Patidar family of Saurashtra region in the Gujarat, India, and was named as Girdhar. His parents, Premjibhai (Father) and Juthiben (Mother) had 4 other children, Kesarben, Keshubhai, Madhubhai and Raliyatben, of which Girdhar was the youngest. Girdhar was from a very poor family, so he was not even able to finish his primary education. Since his childhood, He was very brilliant and had a natural inclination for spiritual learning and reading of religious scriptures. He used to go to sing Swaminarayan Kirtan with his childhood friends to the nearest Swaminarayan Temples. and during this, His art and singing came in the eyes of the saints of Swaminarayan. and therefore, to educate Girdhar and to serve the saints, Saints had taken the permission of girthar's family to bring girdhar with their self. and later saints have decided to make Girdhar a Saint, but girdhar's family was not agreed to it, so girdhar's elder brother Madhubhai brought girdhar back from the saints of Swaminarayan. being attracted by the pure and virtuous life led by the saints of Swaminarayan Sampraday, Girdhar left his home and renounced his family at the age of 12 to become a Saint of Swaminarayan Sampraday. His brothers, Keshubhai had died at the young age while Madhubhai had shifted to the village Thordi. Currently, From the entire family of Girdhar, Nagjibhai (Son of Madhubhai) and his family members are the only who are alive and living in Surat.

== Religious education ==
After joining Swaminarayan Sampraday, he finished his primary and Secondary education in Gujarat and then he had gone to Banaras Hindu University for higher education where he passed Master of Arts- M.A in 6 different Religious Subjects in Sanskrit and therefore people also used to call him as Sanskrutachary which means a person who has a phenomenal knowledge of the language Sanskrit. Swami had also received Shastri degree from Banaras. During his entire education in Banaras/Kashi, he had studied with some of the greatest Hindu religious leaders, such as Pandurang Shastri Athavale - Dada of Swadhyay Parivar, Dongreji Maharaj of Vaishnav Sampraday, Swami Sachchidanandji (Dantali), Swami Satyamitranand (Former Shankaracharya). He also had written a Book in Sanskrit named Gyan Vilas.

== Kathaas, Tapas and fasting ==
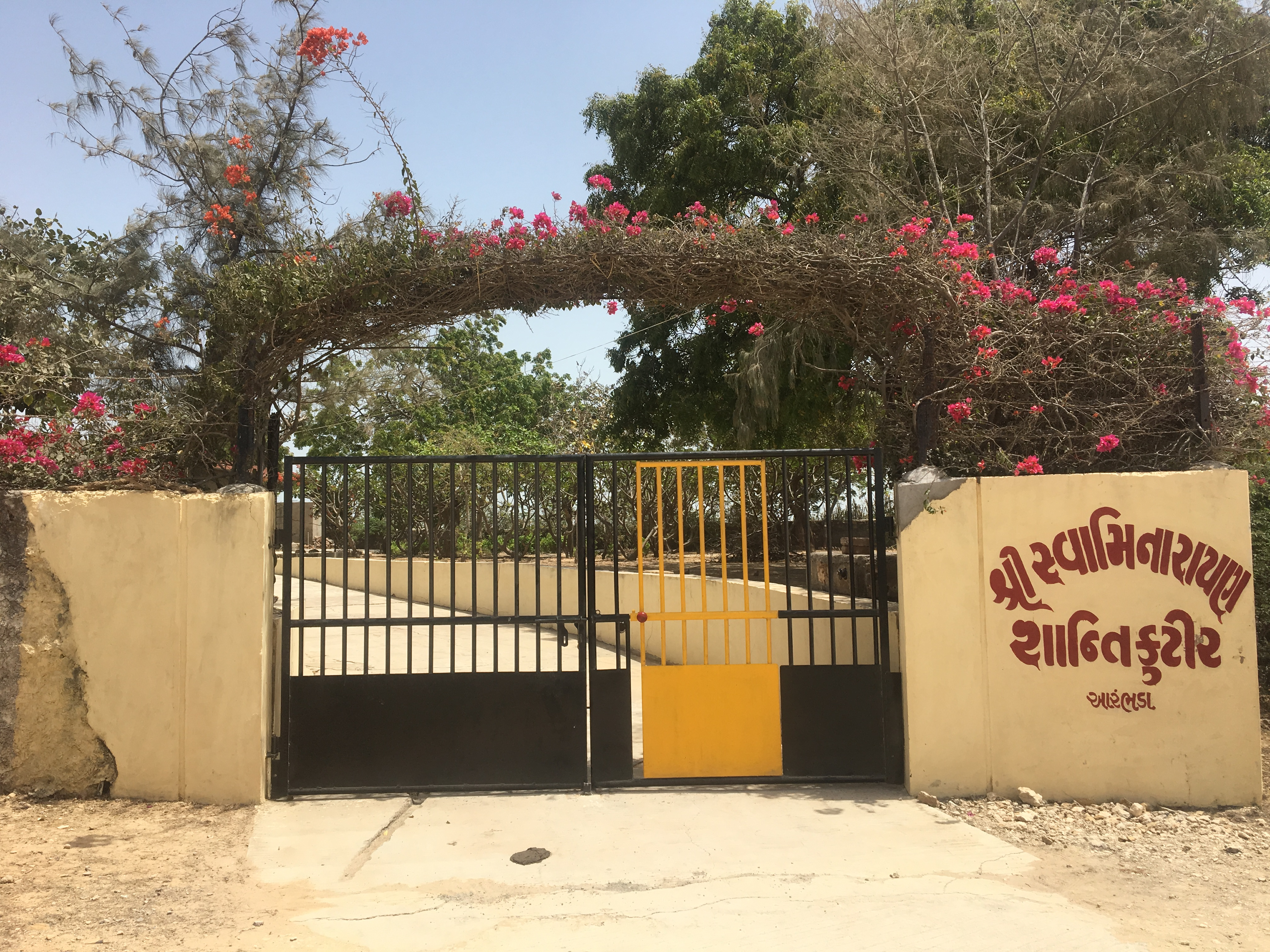
Swami's Shanti Kutir in Arambhada, Gujarat

Swami Narayanprasaddasji had conducted over 100 Kathaas in the Gujarat, Hindi and Sanskrit, most of them were based on the Bhagavata Purana, Bhaktachintamani of Nishkulanand Swami and Vachanamrut. During his whole life, Swami was mostly known for his Tapas (Sanskrit: तप) as he had started doing a deep Tapas for the last 30 years of his life at his resident Shanti Kutir located at the Arambhada village on the coast near Dwarka and therefore, he was known as Tapomurti. transl. Ascetic). Swamiji used to drink only one litre of Milk per day and sometimes, he used to drink Coconut water as a food because he had abandoned the normal food and had not even eaten the single piece of Grain or any item made of any kind of Grains since the last 55 years of his life.

== Kirtan ==
Swamiji was very fond of learning and singing Kirtan from childhood and it was said that Swami remembered more than 1000 kirtan. due to the Swami's voice was good, Dev Utsav Mandal (a Band) of Rajkot who are the devotees of Swami had recorded a Kirtan in the voice of Swami which was released after Swami's death.

== Award ==
Shastri Swami Shri Narayanprasaddasji had received Award from the Second President of India Dr. Sarvepalli Radhakrishnan for his Education and Knowledge towards the language Sanskrit.

== Death ==
He had been suffering from a Prostatitis in his last days. Due to this, he had been shifted from Shanti Kutir, Arambhada to Swaminarayan Gurukul (Naghedi, Jamnagar) in the care of other Saints, where his surgery was performed. but unfortunately, he died at around 12 pm on 30 January 2018 at the Age of 97 at Swaminarayan Gurukul (Naghedi, Jamnagar). The funeral of Swami had taken place as per Vedic Tradition on 31 January 2018 in the presence of the large numbers of Swaminarayan Saints and devotees of Swaminarayan Sampraday.

== Media coverage ==
After Swami's Death, the Official confirmation of the death of Swami was made by the Saints of Jamnagar Swaminarayan Gurukul and Some of the big Gujarati Newspapers and Online News Portals like Divya Bhaskar (Online News portal) & Newspaper, Nobat Newspaper, Sandesh Newspaper, AajKaal Newspaper, akilanews.com (Online News Portal) and patelsamaj.co.in (Online News portal) have published the articles of Swami's Life and Death.
