= Raipur Nangli =

- village
- Location in Uttar Pradesh, India Raipur Nangli (India)
- Coordinates: 29.276°N 77.731°E
- Country: India
- State: Uttar Pradesh
- District: Muzaffarnagar

Languages
  - Official: Hindi
- Time zone: UTC+5:30 (IST)

Raipur Nangli is a village in Khatauli tehsil, Muzaffarnagar district, Uttar Pradesh state in India. It belongs to Saharanpur division, and is located 25 kilometres (16 mi) south of district headquarters Muzaffarnagar and 485 kilometres (301 mi) from the state capital Lucknow. Nearby towns and cities include Sardhana, Hastinapur and Meerut.

The village is on the border of the Muzaffarnagar and Meerut districts.
