= Shrimad Vidyadheesh Teerth Swamiji =

24th peethadhish of Gokarna Math

His Holiness Shri Vidyadheesh Teertha Swamiji
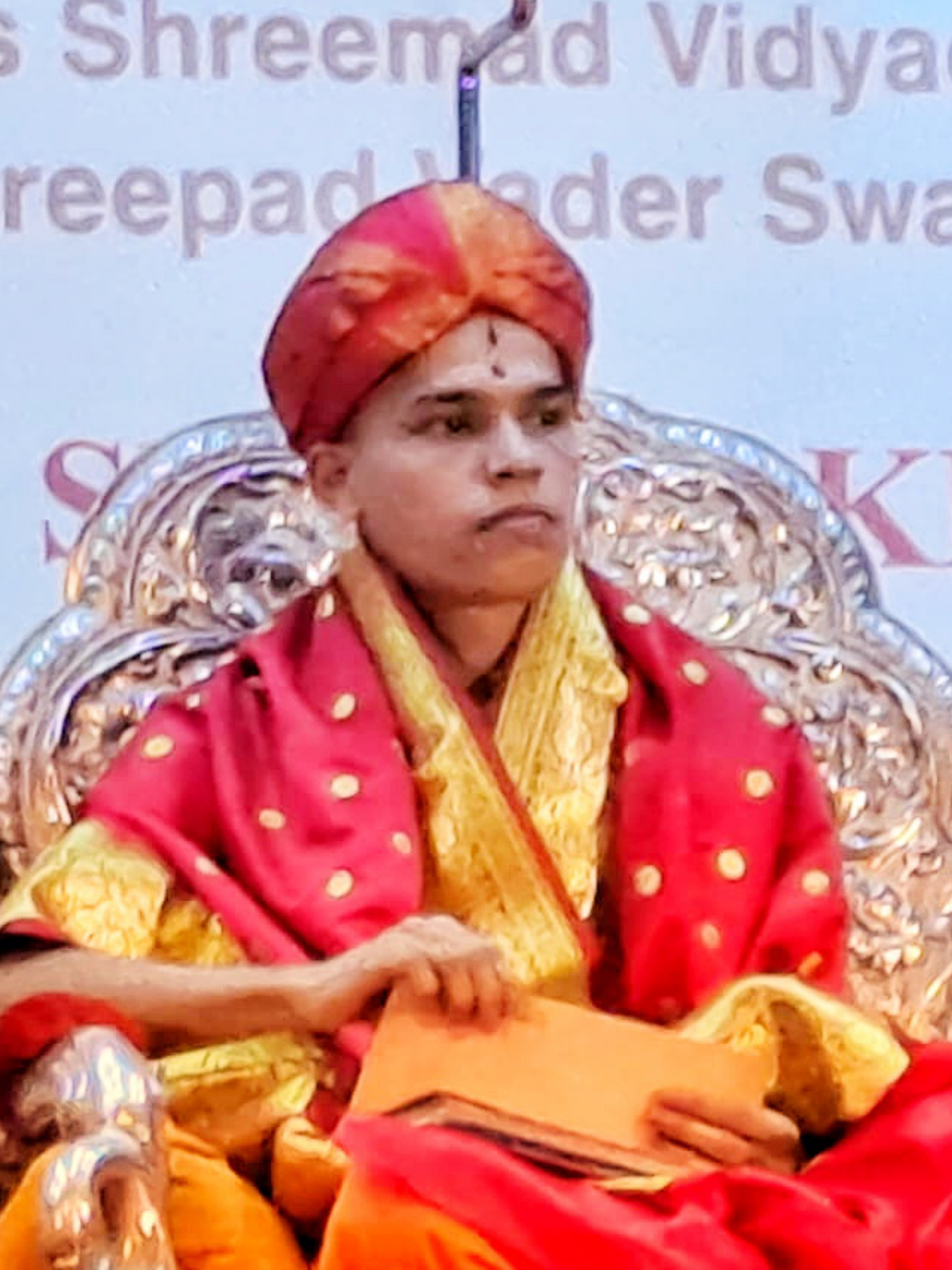
- In office 30 July 2021 – present
- Preceded by: Shrimad Vidyadhiraj Teerth Swamiji
- Title: Shri Vidyadheesh Teertha Swamiji

Personal life
- Born: Uday Bhat Sharma; 10 October 1995 (age 30) Belgaum, Karnataka, India
- Home town: Belgavi
- Citizenship: Indian

Religious life
- Religion: Hinduism
- Philosophy: Dvaita
- Sect: Gokarna Math

Religious career
- Teacher: Shrimad Vidyadhiraj Teerth Swamiji

Gokarna Math
- Incumbent
- Assumed office 2021-present
- Preceded by: Shrimad Vidyadhiraj Teerth Swamiji
- Website: https://www.dbcblr.org

Shrimad Vidhyadheesh Teerth Swami (born 10 October 1995; formerly Uday Bhat Sharma), also referred to as Shri Vidhyadhish Teerth Swamiji, became head (Mathadipathi) of the Gokarna Partagali Math in July 2021. He is the 24th successive person of Gokarna Math according to Guru Parampara.

== Early life ==
In February 2017 Uday Bhat Sharma of 21 years of age, an engineering student of Maratha Mandal Engineering College, Belgaum, Karnataka was officially declared by Sripad Vader Swamiji to be his successor to head the matha.

== Head of Gokarna Partagali Math ==
Shrimad Vidhyadhish Teerth Swamiji, the predecessor Shrimad Vidyadhiraj Teerth Swamiji as mathadipathi, attained moksha on 19 July 2021. In accordance with the guru–shishya tradition followed by the math, He had initiated Vidhyadhish Teerth as the shishya who would succeed him upon his death and thus Vidhyadhish Teerth became the new mathadipathi. He officially took charge on 30 July 2021 at Partagali, Poinginim, Canacona, Goa.

== See also ==
- Gokarna Math
- Kashi Math
