= Advaitanand Ji =

Indian spiritual guru

Shri Paramhans Swami Advaitanand Ji Maharaj
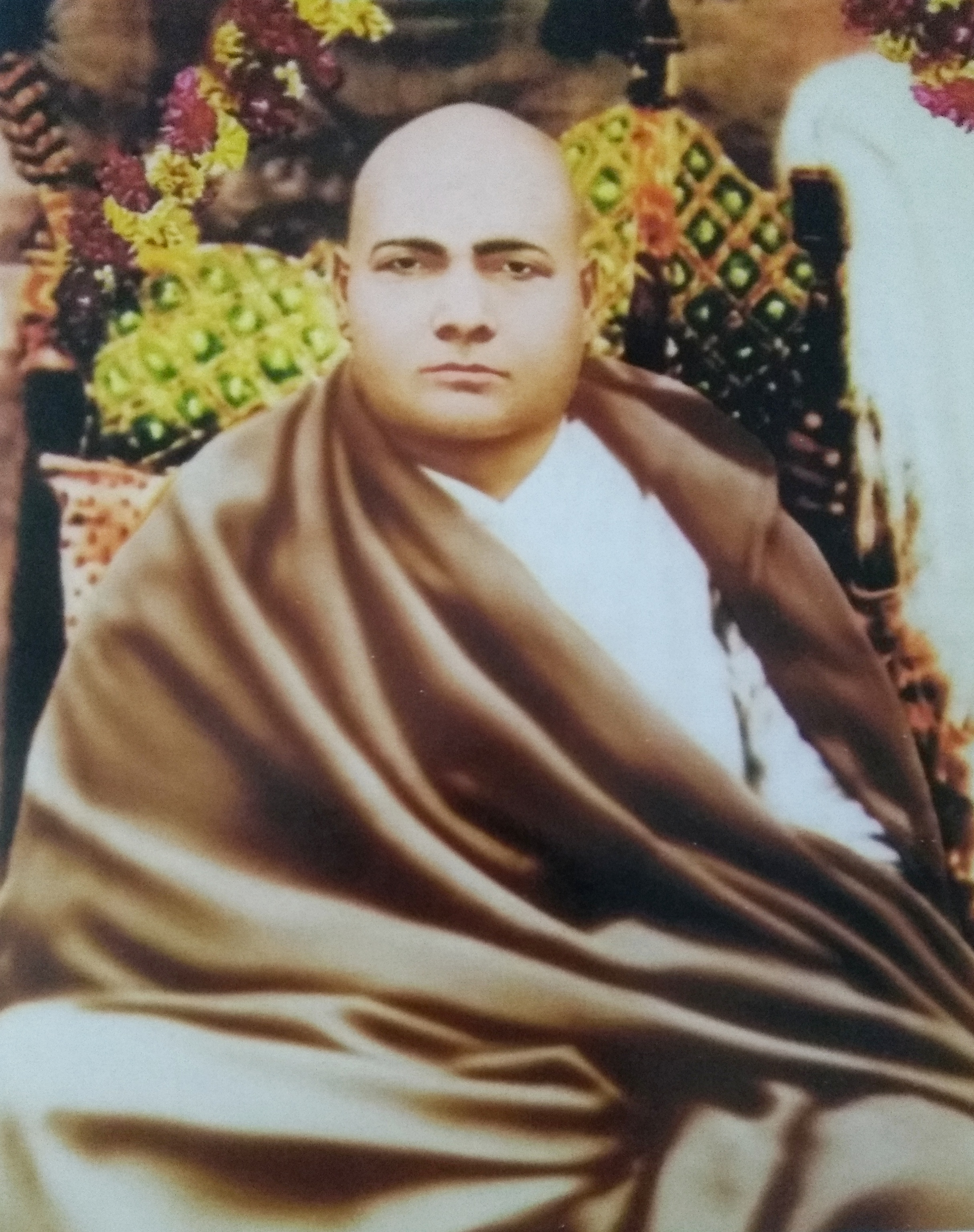
- Born: 5 April 1846; Chhapra (Bihar)
- Died: 10 July 1919 (aged 73)
- Known for: Advait Mat
- Successor: Shri Swami Swarupanand Ji Maharaj

Shri Paramhans Swami Advaitanand Ji Maharaj (5 April 1846 – 10 July 1919), also known as Shri Paramhans Dayal Maharaj Ji (born Shri Ram Yaad), was born in Chhapra City, India. Shri is known as the "First Spiritual Master" of the Shri Anandpur Dham, while also initiated the "Second Master" and Shri Swami Swarupanand Ji Maharaj in the early 1900s. Shri Anandpur Dham Madhya Pradesh, District Ashoknagar.

== Early life ==
He was born on the day of Rama Navami and was therefore named "Ram Yaad". His father was scholar Pandit Tulsi Pathak; his mother died a few months after his birth, so he was brought up by his father's disciple Lala Narhari Prasad, while Shri Narhari Prasad arranged his education. Shri Ram Yaad learned about Sanskrit, Hindi, and Arabic. When Ram Yaad was five, his father died.

Paramhans Swamiji gave Diksha to him and taught him about Brahma Vidya. When he was 11 years old, Narhari Prasad died and after some years, his wife also died. He was the only rightful successor of both families, but at the age of 16, he left his home and went to the forests of Bihar for meditation. In Jaipur, in 1883, he met the 90-year-old Swami Anandpuri Ji, who taught him the Kriya of Pranayama and Yoga. He reportedly wrote in Urdu on a paper: "Accept Paramhans Ram Yaad". He named him as his spiritual successor to his seat.

== Career ==
He travelled from place to place and carried the message of Sahaj Yoga, Bhakti and service. He stayed at Jaipur for a long time and started his spiritual preaching and uplifting the people there, attracting many followers there. As a wandering monk, he covered Bihar, Uttar Pradesh, Odisha, Madhya Pradesh, Rajasthan, etc. to teach Sahajyoga and Bhakti.

The ashrams (temples) founded by him were called Krishana Dwaras. Sant Mat-a-nuyayi Ashram, Gadwaghat, Varanasi, Brahma Vidyalay and Ashram, Chotka Rajpur, Buxar, Adwait-Swarup Ashram, Paramhans Satyarthi Dham, Rajyog Mandir, Shanti Mohalla, Delhi, and Shri Anandpur Satsang Ashram are all related to him.

He attained Nirvana on 10 July 1919 after transferring succession of the seat to Swami Swarupanand ji. He had promised to his devotee Seth Amirchand that he would sacrifice his body and take Samadhi at his place. A Sacred Samadhi Shrine was built there in Teri, KP, Pakistan. After the Partitiion in 1947, his devotees shifted the center to Anandpur in District Ashoknagar Madhya Pradesh India.

== See also ==
- 2020 Karak temple attack in which Advaitanand Ji's samadhi was destroyed.
