= Swami Purnachaitanya =

Author and Dutch life coach

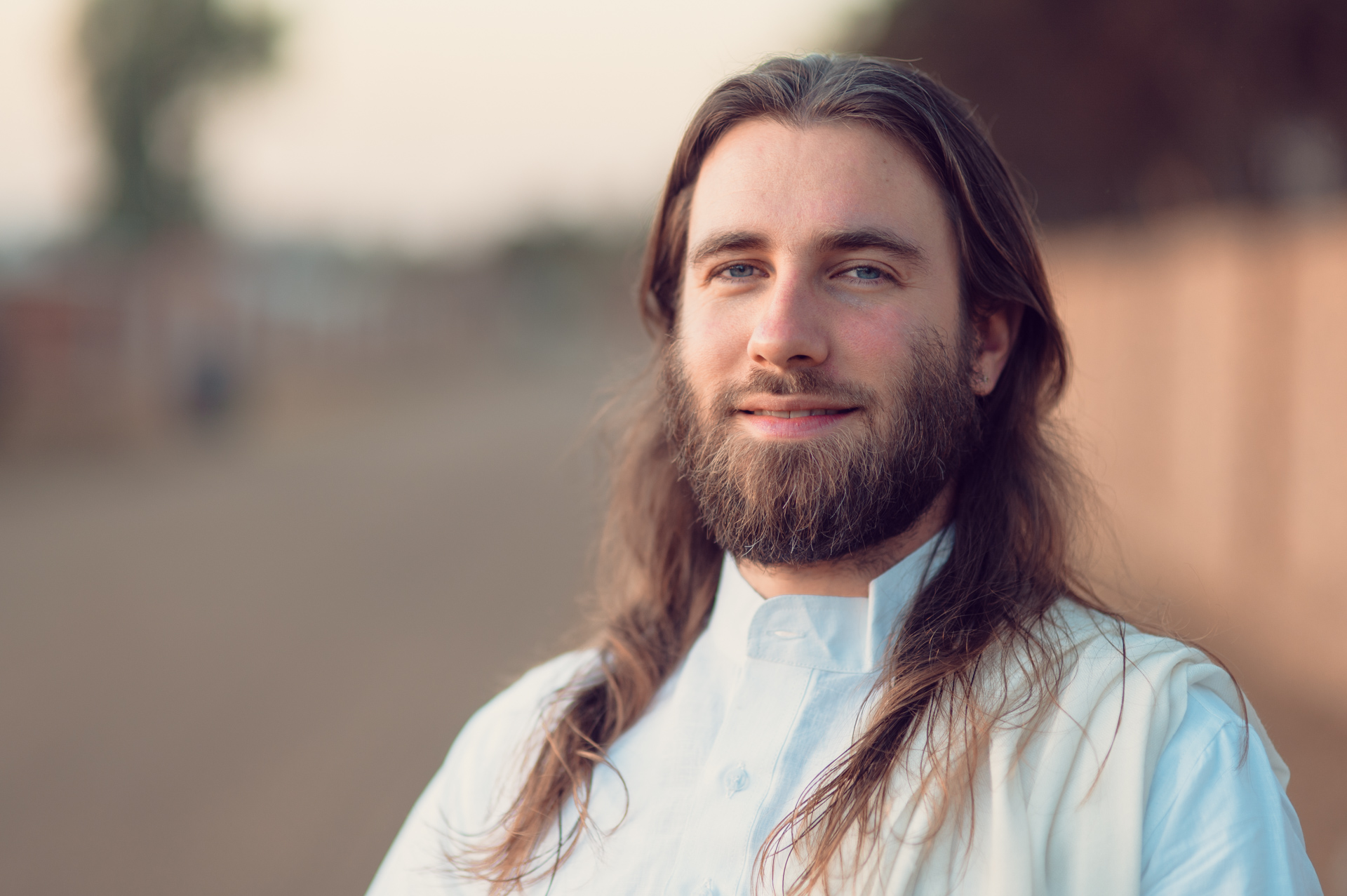
- Born: Alexander Luthra; 26 October 1984 (age 41); Leiden, Netherlands
- Occupations: Life coach; Internet personality; Author
- Notable work: Looking Inward: Meditating to Survive in a Changing World

Swami Purnachaitanya (Svāmī Pūrṇacaitanya), born as Freek Alexander Luthra on 26 October 1984, is an author, Dutch life coach and public speaker. He works at the Art of Living Foundation in Bangalore, India, teaching yoga around India and abroad, and working on rural development and educational projects run by the foundation in the North-Eastern Region of India.

He is a member of the Art of Living Council for yoga. His work is aimed towards the preservation and revival of ancient Vedic practices and indigenous traditions in these regions.

== Early life and education ==
Freek Alexander Luthra was born on 26 October 1984, in Leiden town in the Netherlands to parents Sonia Luthra and Bart Pieter van den Roovaart. He was named Freek (short form for Frederick, which means "Peaceful Ruler") and Alexander (which means "Defender of the People"). Both his Dutch father and Indian mother were also spiritually inclined and initiated him into yoga, meditation, and Eastern philosophies early on.

When he was 5 years old, his family moved to Haarlem, another town in the Netherlands, where he spent the rest of his childhood and teenage years.

Alexander's parents were introduced to meditation and spiritual teachings through the programs of Maharishi Mahesh Yogi and decided to raise both- Alexander and his younger brother Sebastian as vegetarians and introduced them to meditation at an early age.

During his childhood, Alexander showed a keen interest in traditions of the East, which led him to learn and practice various eastern martial arts, such as Aikido, Taekwondo, Judo, Ninpo Bujutsu, Capoeira and Wushu (Kungfu). Martial arts helped him understand the importance of breathing, balance, and discipline.

== Spiritual journey ==
In 2000, at the age of 16 years, he met Sri Sri Ravi Shankar at a public program in Amsterdam, and became a regular participant of the Art of Living programs.

Soon after completing his high school studies, he took a year off to work and travel to India for 3 months, where his interest in the Indian traditions, and especially the Vedic traditions and practices deepened. He then went on to study Indology (Languages and Cultures of India and Tibet) at Leiden University, with a specialisation in Sanskrit, along with a course in Journalism and New Media.

After graduation, in 2007, he went to India, where he joined the International Headquarters of the Art of Living Foundation in Bangalore, as a full-time volunteer. He managed various departments in the Ashram, and also started his Vedic studies in the Veda Agama Pathashala (Vedic studies school) in the Ashram.

In 2012, Luthra was formally initiated by Sri Sri Ravi Shankar as a Swami (monk) and was given a new name, Swami Purnachaitanya. Purnachaitanya is a Sanskrit word which means one whose consciousness (chaitanya) has the quality of fullness (purna).

== Bibliography ==
- Looking Inwards: Meditating to Survive in a Changing World ISBN 978-01-4345-208-9 (2021)

== Teaching, social service and welfare initiatives ==
Purnachaitanya became a teacher for various self-development and yoga and meditation programs of the Art of Living in 2008. He is a QCI Certified Level-2 Yoga Teacher and Regional Director of Sri Sri Yoga in India.

From 2009 he started traveling and conducting various programs and service initiatives in South India, mainly in Andhra Pradesh, Telangana and Tamil Nadu. In 2011 his area of work and focus shifted to the Northeast India, where he has traveled and worked extensively in Assam, Arunachal Pradesh, Manipur, Meghalaya, Tripura, Nagaland, Sikkim, and parts of West Bengal.

He has also conducted various programs in Nepal, Bhutan, Sri Lanka, Hong Kong, Dubai, and a few countries in Europe.
