= Swami Sharnanandji =

Indian saint

Swami Sharnanandji Maharaj (? - 1974) Vrindavan, Uttar Pradesh, India, was a modern-day Indian saint and the founder of Manav Sewa Sangh, a nonprofit organization dedicated to the spiritual development of the seekers. His teachings were on the practical implementation of how to practice humanity in true sense. Swami Sharnanandji's clarion call to the humankind can be summarized into three exhortations —1) Serve the world; 2) Discover Thyself; and 3) Love the Divine.

Swami Sharnanandji Maharaj

== Childhood ==
Swamiji was from the northern part of India, and belonged to a well-to-do family. Since childhood, Swamiji had shown love and compassion for all beings and a desire to help others. Swamiji had striking eyes, which unfortunately, he reportedly lost at the age of about 10 years. This caused great grief to his family and to Swamiji himself.

After loss of his eyesight the young boy renounced the world and became a Sann'yasi at the age of 19 in pursuit to attain a state of happiness which is free from all sorrows. His Sann'yasi name was Swami Sharnanandji. The young monk gave up all dependence upon objects and companions, and he began observing the strict discipline of Sann’yasa, and started living by relying solely on the mercy of God.

== Philosophy and teachings ==
The most unusual feature of Swamiji's discourses and books is that in them there is no mention of any scriptural proof. His original and unique views stand on the intrinsic soundness of his own first-hand experience. Swamiji knew that the self-evident truth needs no proof. In his view, Truth is limitless; it cannot be confined to books. Truth is free to provide its own introduction. Not only is it capable of being its own introduction, this truth is also capable of illuminating the hearts of its devout readers. During his entire life Swami Sharnanandji shunned all forms of name and fame. He eschewed giving his name on his books, for he believed that it was not right to claim ‘individual’ credit for the ‘universal’ wisdom and did not want to confine the Voice of Truth to a particular ‘name and form.’ He taught that there is really nothing that is ‘personal’ in life. All wisdom is single unitary movement proceeding solely from the Supreme. All his books bear the byline: ‘the founder-saint of Manav Seva Sangh.’ As an ideal saint surrendered to the Supreme, he favored to proclaim and celebrate the Glory of the Lord alone. The total available corpus of his written and recorded legacy consists of some 100 discourses spanning about 50 hours and about 40 books in the Hindi language.

The central theme of Swamiji's teachings revolves around one key question: How to seek the [spiritual] welfare of the individual and create an elegant society? In Swamiji's view, one can transform one's moral character by restraint of senses, selfless service, contemplation of God, and search for Truth. And in the renunciation of one's rights and the protection of the rights of others lies the secret of an elegant society. Swamiji gave the following advice to an aspirant ‘The day you will understand that the world is not made for you, but you are made for the world—the very same day the picture of [your] life will change.’ Elsewhere he explains that compassion and freedom from jealousy are the harbingers of peace in the world: ‘Become at once happy to see one who is happier than you; and be compassionate towards the unhappy—this is the master key for fostering the world-peace.’

== Manav Seva Sangh ==
Swami Sharnanandji established Manav Seva Sangh in 1952 so that through its medium, for centuries to come, humanity's needs regarding knowledge, faith, and action may be served. Its main office is in Vrindavan (India). The need for establishing this organization was felt due to the fact that Swamiji did not want to publish, under his personal name, the universal system of thought that he developed in response to his internal struggle. Swami Sharnanandji became Brahmalin in the year 1974. After Swamiji, his foremost disciple, Param-Vidu i Divya Jyoti Devaki ji took care of the administration of the Manav Seva Sangh. In 1992, Devaki ji too became one with the Supreme Divine Light. After that, Swamiji's disciples Swami Advaita Chaitanya ji and Sadhvi Arpita ji have been taking care of the organization. Manav Seva Sangh is based on the 11 fundamental principles of Humanity & Prayer

» Introspection, i.e., to see one’s own flaws in light of the received conscience.

» Taking the oath of not repeating an already committed mistake, to pray with simple faith.

» To apply discrimination (judgement) for oneself and faith for others, i.e., apply justice for oneself, and love and forgiveness for others.

» One's own development through control over senses, service, remembrance of God, and search for truth.

» Not considering others’ duties as one's own right, others’ magnanimity as one's own goodness, and others’ weakness as one's own strength.

» Despite having no family or societal relation, to have mutual interaction and benevolence in accordance with the sentiment of family, i.e., unity (universality) of love despite the diversity of action.

» To serve the proximate people, as far as possible, through actions.

» From the viewpoint of physical benefit, to practice restraint in eating and lifestyle habits, and self-dependence in daily chores.

» Making the body hard-working, the mind restrained, the intellect conscientious, the heart loving, and the ego pride-less to beautify oneself.

» To consider the objects as more important than money, the people as more important than objects, the conscience as more important than people, and the Truth as more important than conscience.

» To brighten the future by giving up useless-worrying, and by properly utilizing the present.

== Views of Seers and Learned people about Swamiji ==
Acknowledging Swamiji's book, Sant Samagam, the erstwhile President of India, Dr. Rajendra Prasad, was pleased to observe: "I have had the privilege of meeting Swamiji on one or two occasions, and I was very deeply impressed by the way in which he dealt with most complicated problems in a simple, intelligible way. I am therefore very happy to receive the two volumes in which you have collected some of his discourses."

In Swami Ramsukhdasji's assessment, "In Sharnanandji’s books, it becomes evident that he wants the readers to attain realization, and not merely to ‘teach’ the readers. His words have the effect of the bullet of a gun. He states his position in a tacit manner so that the spiritual aspirant may not just learn empty words. Instead of just making the seekers go through the drill of "practice," he used to have them "acknowledge" (the Truth); instead of the "intellectual exercise," he used to let the seekers "experience" (the Truth) directly."

Swami Advaita Chaitanyaji, the current spiritual leader of the Manav Seva Sangh, observes, "Pujaya Swami Ramsukhdasji Maharaj was a unique admirer of the immortal words of the founder-saint of the Manav Seva Sangh. He used to designate the philosophy of Swami Sharnanandji Maharaj as the ‘Seventh System’ (Human Philosophy). He generally used to inspire his close circle community to read Swami Sharnanandji Maharaj's books. He used to regard Swami Sharnanandji Maharaj's words as irrefutable (akatya)."

== Sharnanandji's participation in freedom fight ==
In 1930, Mahatma Gandhi initiated a Satyagraha-movement in opposition of the salt ordinance. Dictators used to be appointed to run this movement and the British government used to arrest them. After the second or the third dictator had been sent to jail, no one used to be prepared to go to jail. Watching this, Swami jumped right in the independence war and assumed the reigns of the local movement. This sparked new enthusiasm among the public. Swamiji delivered motivational speeches and also take part in 'Picketing of the Shops'. As a result, Swamiji too was arrested immediately. In the jail, his orange robes were forcefully taken off and he was made to wear the jail uniform. Swamiji immediately took off those clothes and threw them off. The jailer tried to scare him with physical torture; he was dragged on the floor which wounded his back. A few other Sann’yasins apologized and were released from the jail; however, Swamiji remained steadfast fearlessly and started the hunger-strike. People got worried and they send telegram to the Uttar Pradesh government and to the All India Sann'yasi Federation. Finally, the higher authorities intervened and Swamiji was allowed to wear his orange robes. He was released from the jail after one and a half month; the people of the town gave him a very warm welcome. Swamiji's purpose was to end his attachment for service of the nation (desh-seva); what did he have to do with respect and recognition. Very soon, he left that place.

Last worldly day

He opted to depart from this world on the day important for all major religious beliefs - 25th of December, Christmas, Eid and Gita Jayanti (Mokshda Ekadshi). The year was 1974.

== Publications: Books and Discourses Audio ==
All of Swami Sharnanandji's discourses have been published in the form of a series of books called Sant Vani—vol. 1-8. These books deal with the art of living a spiritual life. In addition, Swamiji dictated several of his books in the form of philosophical essays to his foremost disciple, Param-Vidu i Devaki ji, who, in her pre-sann’yasa days, was an eminent professor of psychology. In addition, Devakiji also compiled and coordinated the publication of Swamiji's discourses and other books. All of Swami Sharnanandji's books are currently available in Hindi language. The English & Gujrati translation of his books has also begun. below is a list of these books under references. Almost all of his discourses are also available in audio format.

A Divine compilation of all HINDI books in 10 Volumes: VoL 1 books VoL 2 books VoL 3 books VoL 4 books VoL 5 books VoL 6 books VoL 7 books VoL 8 books VoL 9 books VoL 10 books

books

A complete list of Sharnanandji Maharaj's books is given below: (in alphabetical order)

- 1. Chit-Shuddhi I & II
- 2. Darshan aur Niti
- 3. Duhkha ka Prabhav
- 4. Jivan-Darshan (in two parts)
- 5. Jivan-Patha
- 6. Jivan-Vivéchan (in seven parts)
- 7. Krantikari Santvani
- 8. Manav Seva Sangh ka Parichyey
- 9. Manav Ki Mang
- 10. Manav-Darshan
- 11. Manavta Ke Mula Siddhant
- 12. Mangalmeya Vidhan
- 13. Mein Ki Khoj
- 14. Mook Satsang and Nitya Yog
- 15. Pathyey (in two parts)
- 16. Prashanottri (in two parts)
- 17. Prerana Patha
- 18. Sadhan-Nidhi
- 19. Sadhan-Tattva
- 20. Sadhan-Triveni
- 21. Safalta Ki Kungi
- 22. Sant Hridayodgar
- 23. Sant Jivan Darpa?
- 24. Sant Pattravali (in three parts)
- 25. Sant Vani (in eight parts)
- 26. Sant-Samagam (in three parts)
- 27. Sant-Saurabh
- 28. Sant-Udbodhan
- 29. Satsang aur Sadhan
- 30. Tarutale

In addition "Ek Mahatma Ka Prasad" published by Gita Press is attributed to Swamijis discourses.
