= Khatkhate Baba =

- Born: Pt. Shiv Prasad Choudhari; 1859; Bazar Sita Ram, Delhi
- Died: 1930 (aged 70–71)

Khatkhate Baba (1859–1930) was a Kashmiri saint alleged to have had divine powers.

In Kashmir it is believed that an abode of Shiva has in the course of time produced a number of holy men, saints, ascetics and sages with supernatural powers to perform miracles, who had innumerable followers venerating them. One such outstanding holy man was Pt. Shiv Prasad Choudhari, who after attaining sainthood became popular as Khatkhate Baba among his very large number of devotees.

His samadhi at Etawah is a pilgrimage centre.
