= Nayakanahatti Thipperudra Swamy =

Indian Hindu spiritual guru

Sri Guru Thipperudraswamy of Nayakanahatti village
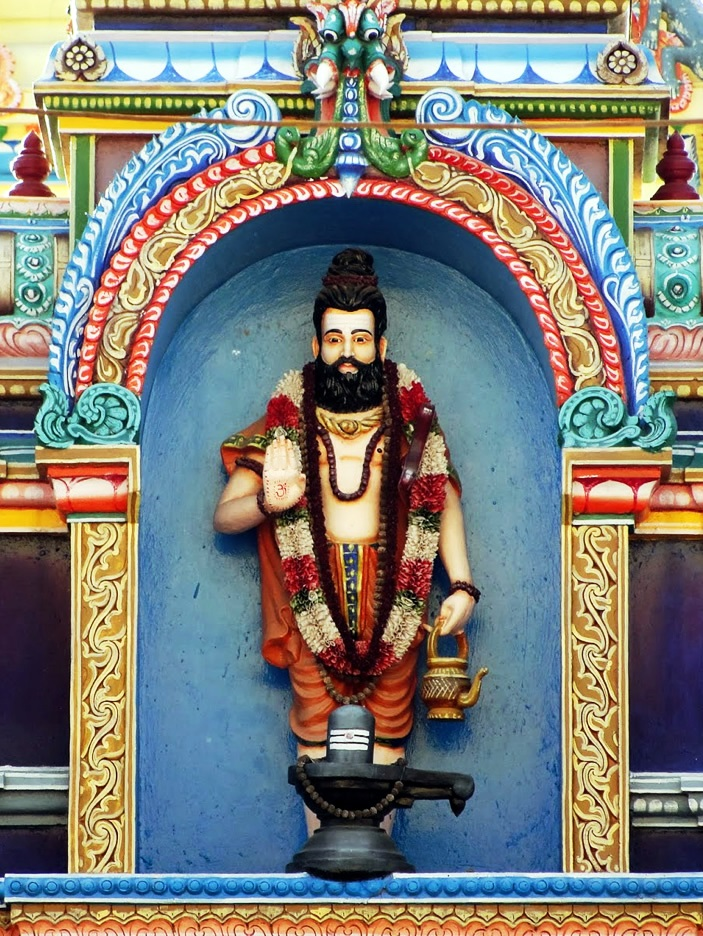
- Sri Guru Thipperudraswamy
- Title: Hindu Guru; Disciple of Lord Shiva

Personal life
- Born: Ganadheeswara Rudraswamy
- Died: Not Known as he took up samadhi on Chitra nakshatra Phalguna Bahula day as per Hindu Calendar. at Nayakanahatti, Chitradurga District, Karnataka, India

Religious life
- Religion: Hinduism
- Philosophy: Karma Yoga, Jnana Yoga, Bhakti Yoga
- Cause of death: samadhi

Quotation

Madidastu Needu Bhikshe (Your reward will be as per your work), Kayakave Kailasa (Work is worship)

Nayakanahatti Thipperudra Swamy, (c. 15th or 16th century), also referred as Tippeswamy, Thippeswamy or Thippeswami, was an Indian Hindu spiritual Guru, and social reformer. He is revered by both his Hindu and Muslim devotees.

He preached that Kayakave Kailasa (Work is worship) and that Maadidashtu Needu Bhikshe (Your reward will be as per your work).

== Birth and early life ==
The details of his early life are not clearly documented. Though there are several legends and references to his origins and early life before arrival at Nayakanahatti (also spelled as Nayakanahatty), they are mostly constrained to oral history.

The date of his birth is unknown however legend says that he descended from Mount Kailash along with 4 other saints. They have not been born through the human stomach like the mortals.

As for the time period of the Guru's life in Nayakanahatti; the Temple Information System website of the Hindu Religious Institutions & Charitable Endowments Department (Government of Karnataka) mentions a rough time period between the 15th and the 16th century, possibly 1570 - 1646 AD.

== Purpose of life ==
Legend has it that Thipperudraswamy was an incarnation of one of the five Ganadheeswaras (Pancha Ganadheeshwara), who originally spread Shaivism (Worship of Shiva) as they were ordered by Lord Shiva himself. These five Gurus were reincarnated across various places in India at various periods of time, with an intention to spread Shiva Dharma in that specific area.

During Sri Guru Thipperudraswamy's times, the other four Ganadheeshwaras were reincarnated as Sri Guru Basaveshwara Swami (Kottureshwara Swami) of Shikhapura (Kottur), Sri Kolashanteshwara of Arasikere, Sri Kempaiah Swamy of Harapura (Harpanahalli) and Sri Maddanaswamy of Kulahalli.

Thipperudra Swamy's purpose of life was to spread the word of Dharma and provide guidance and solace to fellow human beings.

== The legend behind the origins of his name – Thippeswamy or Thipperudraswamy ==
The Guru's original name was Rudraswamy. During the course of his travels across Southern India, he met one of the other reincarnated Ganadheeshwaras, Sri Kempaiah Swamy, who had forgotten his original purpose of life and was caught up in the mundane pleasures, problems and desires of human life.

With the intent to enlighten Kempaiah Swamy, Rudraswamy sat in meditation on a big mound of refuse and cow dung (referred to as ‘Thippe’ in the local languages). This foul smelling mound was intended to be composted for use as a fertilizer in the fields and such mounds can be seen even today in the fields of rural India.

Since the ‘Thippe’ was along the path that Kempaiah had to take to reach his fields, he could not help but notice the divine looking Sadhu seated on the foul heap of refuse. Slowly other passersby too noticed this Sadhu and began referring to him as ‘Thippe’ swamy – the Swamy who was seated on the mound. Though the locals started to stop by to pay their respects and leave food and other offerings for the meditating Sadhu, he continued to sit in silence for many days, undisturbed by the Sun, the Wind and the Rain.

Eventually, Kempaiah walked up to the seated Guru, paid his respects and was wondering as to why the Guru was seated on this mound of refuse, when there were plenty of shady trees around or caves in the nearby hills where the Swamy could have meditated.

Rudraswamy then opened his eyes and revealed his identity to Kempaiah. He stated that even though he was seated on the mound of refuse, he was not letting the smell or the dirt affect his senses and he continued with his original purpose of meditating on Shiva.

Kempaiah realized the allegory wherein he had been distracted from his original purpose of life by the pains and pleasures of normal human life and he remembered his true identity and purpose. Eventually Kempaiah Swamy let go of his worldly pursuits and went on to become the Sri Guru Kempaiah Swamy of Harapura (Harpanahalli).

== Arrival at Nayakanahatti ==
Nayakanahatti is a small town located 35 km from the District headquarters, Chitradurga. Its original name was Nishadapura, however it slowly came to be referred as ‘Nayakana Hatti’ – The Leader's place; after Sri Guru Thipperudraswamy took up residence there.

One of the Guru's early disciples, a trader named Phaniyappa, requested Thipperudraswamy to visit his town, Nishadapura. When Thipperudraswamy arrived, he wished to stay at the temple of a local deity.

As per legend, the local deity refused to allow the Guru to enter the temple and the doors could not be opened. Realizing the background, Thipperudraswamy prayed to the deity that though he could not stay in the temple premises, he should at least be allowed to keep his ‘Betta’ (Walking stick) and ‘Jolige’ (Shoulder bag) in the temple for safekeeping, as they were his only essential worldly possessions.

The doors of the temple could then be opened and the Guru left his Betta and Jolige inside and walked away. Overnight the two objects expanded to become so large that they pushed out the statue of the local deity, who then left the place. The temple became the residence of the Guru Thipperudraswamy, who installed a Shivalinga there.

While the above legend can be discounted as a local myth, since the Guru Thipperudraswamy was spreading the worship of Shiva, at some point in his lifetime, the popularity of the previous local deity Mariamma seems to have waned and her temple were converted into the current Nayakanahatti Shiva temple.

== Teachings and philosophy ==
While Sri Guru Thipperudraswamy preached the worship of Shiva, the highlight of his teachings and philosophy seem to be the importance he gave to work. He preached and practiced ‘Kayakave Kailasa’ – work is worship. During his lifetime, apart from his religious work, he was also instrumental in the creation and expansion of water reservoirs around Nayakanahatti, some of which continue to store and provide water in the drought prone region.

He also preached ‘Madidastu Needu Bhikshe’ (Your reward will be as per your work), whereby he paid men and women equal wages for their work on the reservoirs. He also started a custom of paying one and a half times the wages for any pregnant ladies working on the projects; with the logic that even the unborn child was involved in the effort and should be paid at least half the normal wages.

== Claimed miracles ==
=== Bringing a dead buffalo back to life ===
When the Guru was still new in Nayakanahatti, there was a noble widow in the village, with two young children. Her only source of income to feed her family was from selling the milk of a water buffalo she owned. Even on days when she could not earn enough, she would not seek help from others. Preferring to go hungry and give her children water to try and quell their hunger.

One day, the buffalo fell ill and died. Without any other source of income and too self-respecting to beg help from anyone, she contemplated committing suicide along with her children, by jumping into a deep well. The next evening, she was walking towards a well outside the town along with her children who were excited to be going on a trip with their mother, blissfully unaware that this would be their last walk.

On the way, she encountered Guru Sri Thipperudraswamy sitting in discussion under a tree, with a group of people from the village. She stopped briefly to pay respect to the Guru and was turning around to continue on her journey.

The Guru called out to her and said “We are feeling very hungry and thirsty sitting here all day, go and get us a pitcher of milk from your buffalo.” With a tear in her eye, the lady replied that her buffalo had died the previous day.

The Guru rebuked her with a smile and said “What do you mean the buffalo has died? It is hale and hearty and can give enough milk for your family and also for all of us. Don’t waste time, go quickly and fetch the milk.”

When the widow walked back to her house, she found the buffalo in full health and from that day onwards, the widow and her children did not face any paucity of food.

The episode is used to indicate that if you persist in the right path through difficult times, the Guru appreciates your efforts and you will be rewarded.

=== Construction of the water reservoir at Nayakanahatti ===
When a severe drought hit the region around Nayakanahatti, the local farmers could do nothing but sit idle. With every passing week, their stores of grain and food diminished and even their cattle started to die due to lack of fodder and water.

Guru Sri Thipperudraswamy realized that there had to be a short-term fix and a long-term solution for the problem on hand. People immediately needed some regular work to earn a living till the rains arrived. Also, there was a need to store water from the rains and the small seasonal streams, to be used during the dry periods.

The Guru then requested the local Palegar (Administrator) to build a water reservoir in Nayakanahatti. Due to the drought, even the tax collections had fallen drastically and the Palegar expressed his inability to fund the reservoir construction. The Guru then assured the Palegar that if he could get the construction of the reservoir started, he would take care of the payments to the workers.

With the Guru's blessings, a suitable location was finalized and the construction began in earnest. At the end of the first day, the Guru asked the laborers to make small mounds of earth. He then proceeded to touch each mound with his ‘Betta’ – walking stick.

When the workers dug up the mounds they had made, they found Gold, Silver or Copper coins commensurate with the work that they had done during the day.

This miracle continued every evening for several months and the people of Nayakanahatti and the surrounding villages could earn enough to feed themselves and their families.

Some unscrupulous men tried to take advantage of the Guru's largess by arriving just before the day ended, mingling with the crowd of workers and building their own mounds of earth. However, miraculously, only the people who actually worked on the reservoir would find the coins. The Guru had noticed this and proclaimed Madidastu Needu Bhikshe (Your reward will be as per your work).

When a woman working on the project found one and a half times the normal sum she was expecting, she mentioned this to the Guru that she had been paid more. The Guru then told the lady that she was pregnant and since her unborn child was also toiling with her on the project, it was but fair that the child too should get at least half the amount as would be paid to an adult worker.

The Nayakanahatti reservoir is still in use and continues to provide water for drinking and irrigation in the region.

== Jeeva Samadhi ==
On Chitra nakshatra Phalguna Bahula day as per the Hindu Calendar, Thipperudraswamy is said to have been entered Jeeva Samadhi, i.e. he was buried alive as per his wishes. There is a temple car - Rathothsava festival(subscription required) organized every year in the memory of the famous saint, which is attended by lakhs of people from across Karnataka, Andhra Pradesh and Telangana.

== The Temples or Matha|Matas of Nayakanahatti ==
There are three Mata's or Temples in Nayakanahatti.

=== OlaMata or inner Mata also called Darbar Mata ===
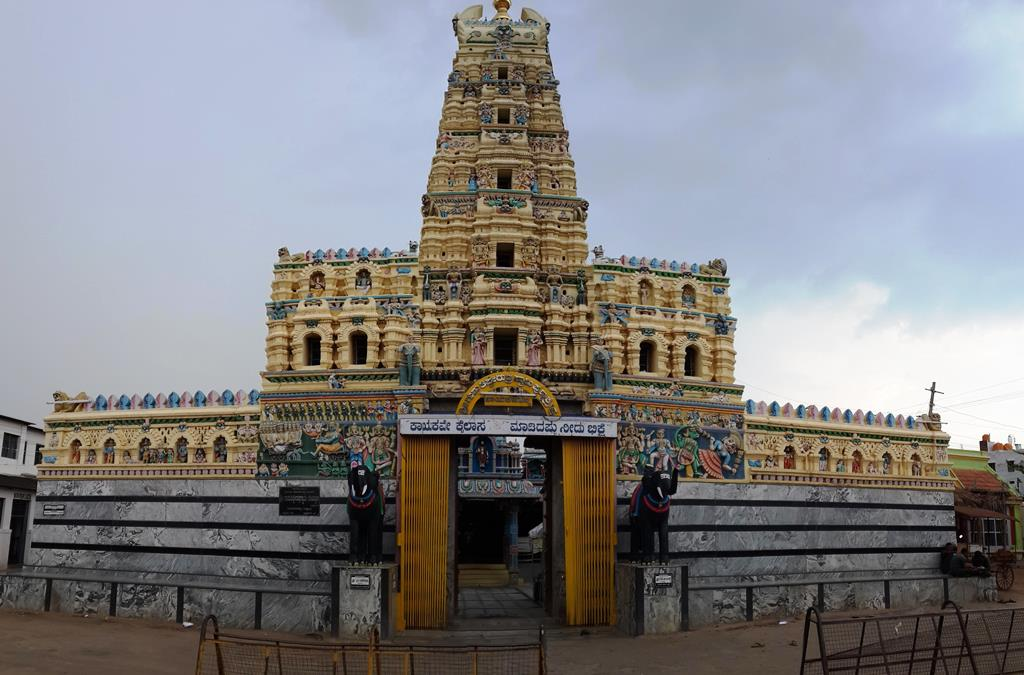
The OlaMata - Nayakanahatti Shiva temple

The OlaMata, also referred to as HireMata or DarbarMata is the focal point of Nayakanahatti. It was the primary residence of the Guru Thipperudraswamy and he would normally entertain visitors here.

This structure was originally a temple of a local deity Maramma. After the Guru took up residence here, a Shivaling was installed here, converting it into a Shiva temple.

The temple has 18 stone pillars with various carvings and elegantly designed stone roof. The ‘Rajagopura’ at the entrance was added at a later date and is said to be around 200 years old.

=== HoraMata or the outer Mata ===
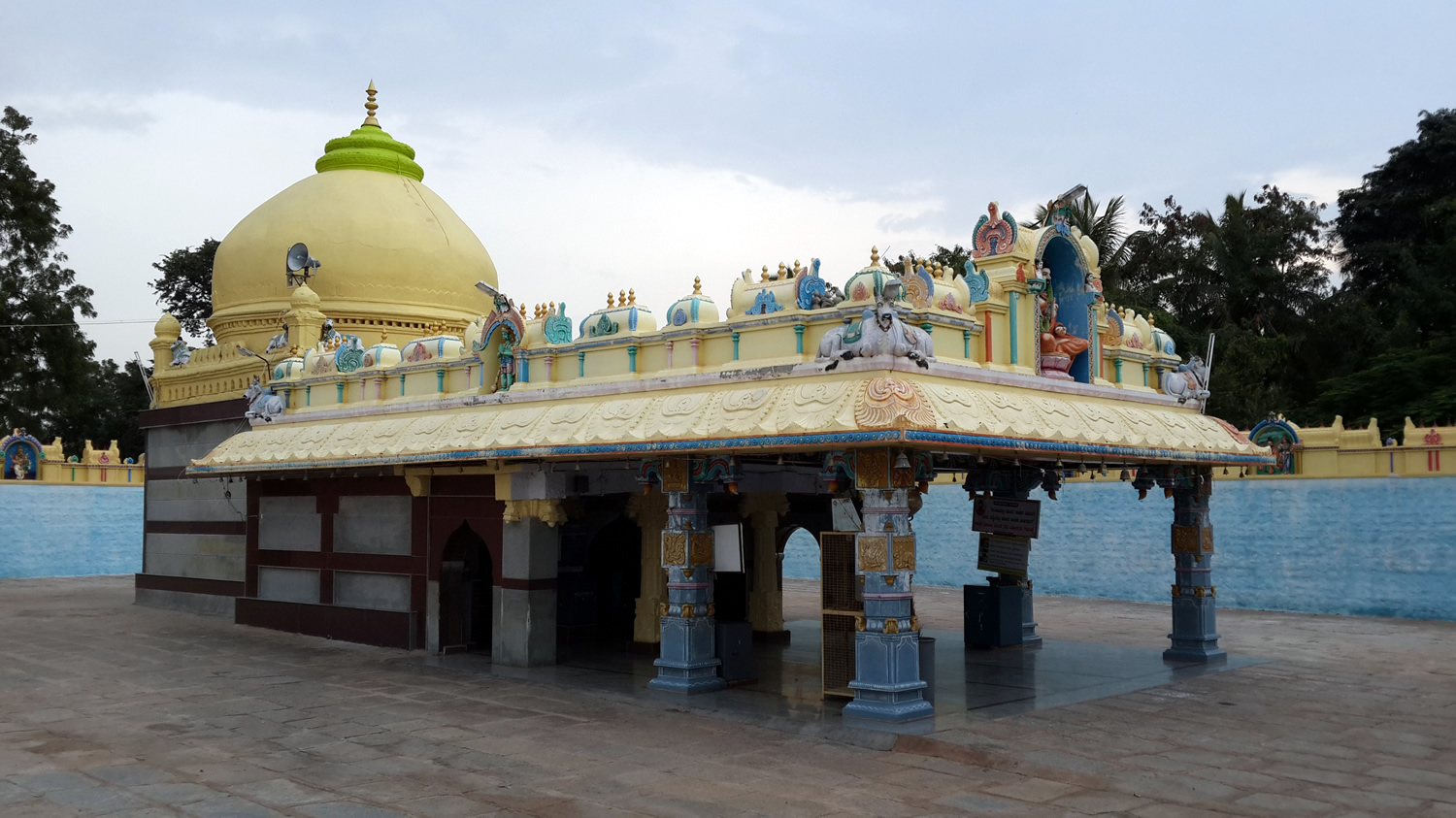
The HoraMata, where Thipperudraswamy took up Jeeva Samadhi

The HoraMata, located in the outskirts of the town has the Jeeva Samadhi of the Guru Thipperudraswamy.

The HoraMata was originally built by Raja Bhichchugatti Bharamanna, the ruler Palegar of Chitradurga in the year 1721 AD. Subsequent additions were made to the HoraMata, including the Indo-Saracenic structure added by Hyder Ali.

The Sanctum of the temple is covered with a dome that is typically seen in Islamic structures such as Mosques or Dargahs. The rest of the temple is built like a typical Hindu structure. This temple is therefore considered to be a symbol of Hindu-Muslim unity and visited by believers from both religions.

=== Ekantha Mata ===
The Ekantha Mata, also called the Ekanthaswamy Mata is located at a distance of 3 Kilometers from the OlaMata, on the route leading towards Challakere. This was a small place where the Guru would retreat for penance.

== A unique custom of burning dry coconut ==
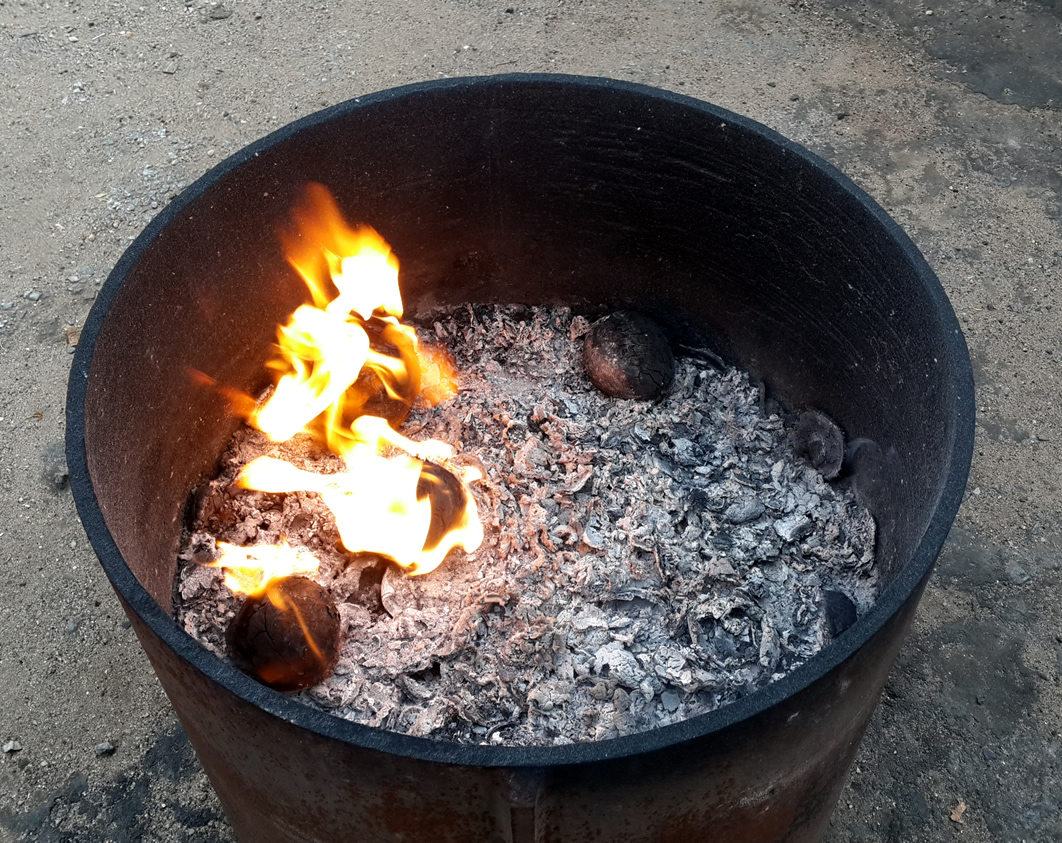
Coconut Kernel (Copra) being burnt in an open metal tub at the Nayakanahatti temple.

A unique custom that is practiced in the Nayakanahatti temple is to burn dry coconut meat (copra) and consuming a portion of it as a 'prasad' - holy offering. The custom is attributed to Guru Thipperudraswamy's liking for the burnt coconut.

Local experts believe that the custom may have been originally started to burn dry coconut husks (Instead of the dried coconut meat, as it is done now.) over an enclosed low fire, which would then become activated charcoal. This activated charcoal was consumed by the devotees for its medicinal and purifying properties.

During the annual Jathra days, thousands of devotees would arrive at Nayakanahatti, leading to sanitation issues and there would be a general increase in cases of diarrhea, indigestion, food poisoning and flatulence. Activated charcoal may be an effective remedy for such cases.

Over the centuries, the purpose and reasons behind the old custom was forgotten and today devotees burn copra over a fire outside the temple as prasad.

== In culture ==
=== Film and television ===
Shree Guru Thipperudraswamy has been the subject of a full-length feature film in Kannada language.

Year	Film	Title role	Supporting roles	Director	Language	Awards
2014	Nayakanahatti Shree Guru Thipperudraswamy Mahatme	BC Patil	Arun Devasya, Disha Poovaiah and Moogu Suresh	B Shivanand	Kannada	Karnataka State Film Awards 2014 - Best Supporting Actor – Arun Devasya

He has also been the subject of documentary in an episode of TV9's series OM.

Year	Name of Documentary	Produced by	Viewable at
2014	TV9 Special: "OM": Nayakanahatti Thipperudraswamy	TV9 Television Channel	https://www.youtube.com/watch?v=-24JUM26rV0

== Nayakanahatti Jatre and rathotsava ==
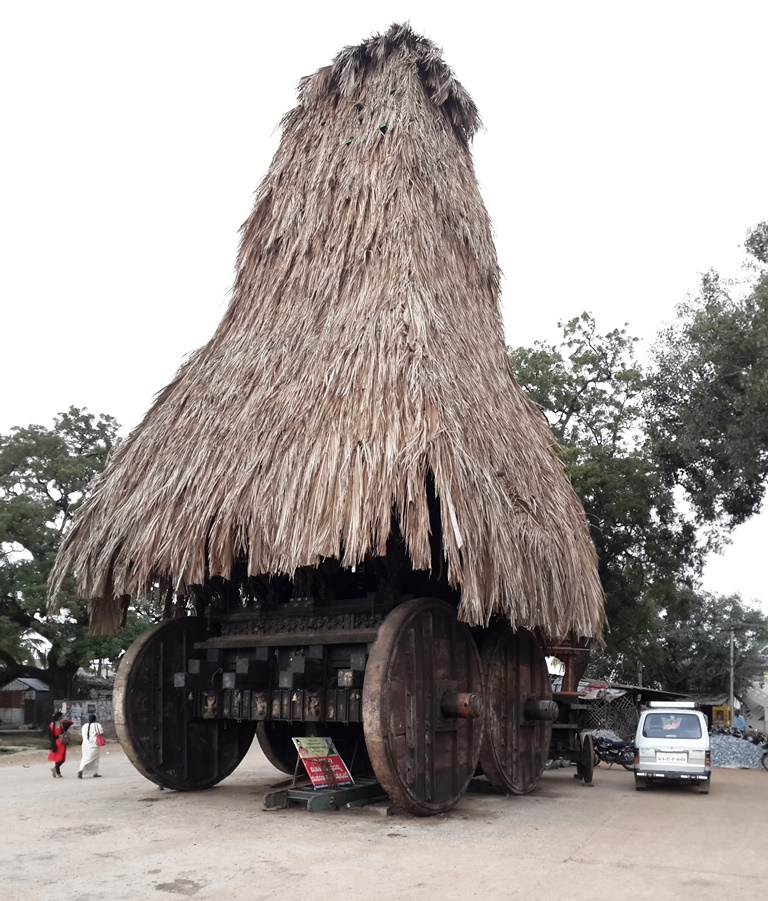
The Temple Chariot at Nayakanahatti

An annual Jatra (Fair and Festival) and Rathotsava (Chariot festival) are held annually in Nayakanahatti, over a period of three to eight days in the Hindu calendar month of Phalguna.

Lakhs of people from across Karnataka, Andhra Pradesh and Telangana arrive to participate in the festivities.

The highlight of the festival is the Rathothsava, where the wooden temple car is pulled by thousands of devotees through a predetermined route.

== See also ==
- List of Hindu gurus and saints
