= Om Swami =

Indian mystic (born 1979)

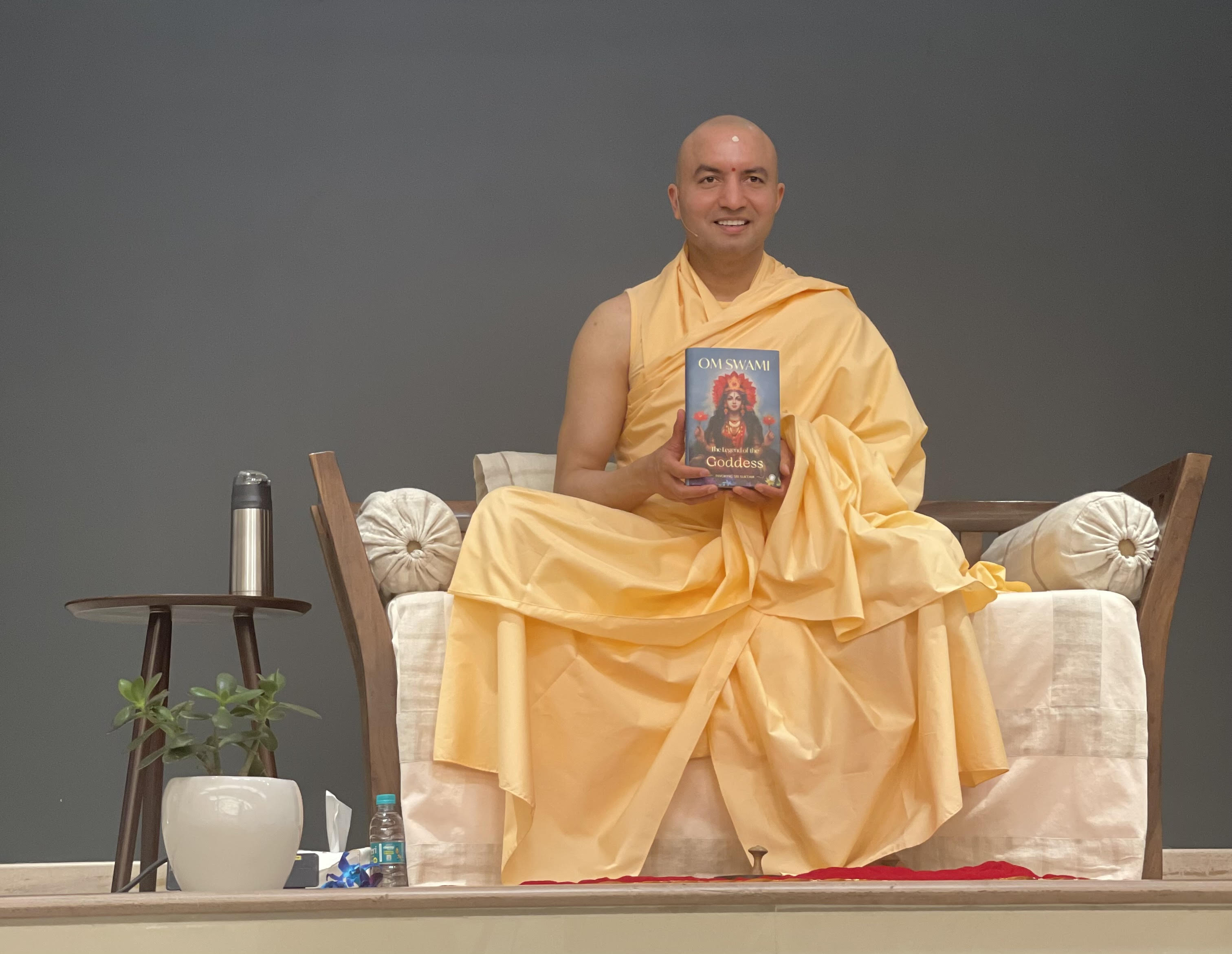
- Born: 30 November 1979 (age 46); Punjab, India
- Citizenship: Australian
- Education: Western Sydney University; University of Technology Sydney
- Occupation: Author
- Notable work: If Truth Be Told: A Monk's Memoir
- Height: 5 ft 10 in (178 cm)
- Website: www.omswami.com

Om Swami is a business leader, spiritual leader and a bestselling author who resides in his ashram in the Himalayan foothills. He is the founder of the Sadhana App, the Black Lotus App, the Wildr App and os.me, a writing platform. Before renunciation, he was a successful tech entrepreneur. Swami is the bestselling author of more than fifteen books on meditation, wellness, and spirituality, such as Kundalini: An Untold Story, The Wellness Sense, and If Truth Be Told: A Monk's Memoir. He has also documented his experiences on meditation for over 15,000 hours in his well-received book A Million Thoughts.

== Early life ==
Showing a deep inclination towards spirituality from an early age, Swami studied a range of Vedic and astrological texts. He quit his job as a part-time editor for a weekly business newspaper to pursue graduation and post-graduation degrees from Australia.

== Education and early career ==
Swami graduated with a Bachelor of Business from University of Western Sydney in 2000 and with a Master of Business Administration from University of Technology Sydney in 2002. Later, he started a software business in Australia and expanded its operations to the United States, Canada, United Kingdom, and India over the next six years. He became a millionaire owing to his IT company. Later, Swami moved back to India.

== Renunciation and spiritual journey ==
On 15 March 2010, Swami renounced his material wealth and left for his spiritual journey quietly. Heading straight to Kashi, he was initiated into the path of renunciation by a Naga saint in a little village some eighty kilometers from Varanasi. After spending four and a half months there, Swami left for the Himalayas where he spent the next thirteen months in intense meditation in complete isolation and solitude. During the days of his intense practice, he claims to have meditated for up to 22 hours every day including straight 10-hour stretches. Researchers and Scientists from IIT studied the effects of his intense spiritual practices (tapasya) and published the findings in 2019 research papers.

== Views ==
Swami gives his own perspective on enlightenment on his website and in his book If Truth Be Told. "Enlightenment does not mean you have to live like a pauper. It does not mean you have to subject yourself to a life of hardship and abstinence. On the contrary, to be enlightened means to live in the light of love, compassion and truthfulness".

== Literary work ==
If Truth Be Told: A Monk's Memoir is his memoir, published by HarperCollins in December 2014. The book was listed as number 6 in the top 10 non fiction books in the country as reported by The Financial Express (India). His fictional novel The Last Gambit was translated as La vie est un jeu d'échecs in French. It won the Chronos Prize for Literature (2019) in France.

== Books ==
- The Bhagavad Gita Retold: Timeless Questions for a Modern World, HarperCollins; 2026.
- Thirteen Months in the Himalayas: Chronicles of a Monk's Sadhana'', HarperCollins; 2024.
- The Legend of the Goddess, Jaico Publishing House; 2024.
- The Big Questions of Life, HarperCollins; 2020.
- The Book of Kindness: How to Make Others Happy and Be Happy Yourself , HarperCollins; 2019.
- The Heart of Success, Jaico Publishing House; 2019.
- The Children of Tomorrow: A Monk's Guide to Mindful Parenting , HarperCollins; 2019.
- The Hidden Power of Gayatri Mantra, Jaico Publishing house; 2019.
- Mind Full to Mindful: Zen Wisdom from a Monk's bowl, HarperCollins; 2018.
- A Fistful of Wisdom: A Monk's light musings on life's serious stuff, Jaico Publishing House; 2017.
- The Ancient Science of Mantras, Jaico Publishing House; 2017.
- The Last Gambit, HarperCollins; 2017.
- A Million Thoughts: Learn all about meditation from the Himalayan mystic, Jaico Publishing House; 2016.
- When All is Not Well: Depression and Sadness from a Yogic Perspective, HarperCollins; 2016.
- Kundalini: An Untold Story, Jaico Publishing House; 2016.
- The Wellness Sense: A Practical Guide to Your Physical and Emotional Health Based on Ayurvedic and Yogic Wisdom, HarperCollins, 2015.
- A Fistful of Love: Wisdom and humor from a Monk's bowl, Jaico Publishing House; 2015.
- If Truth Be Told: A Monk's Memoir, Harper Element; 2014.
