= Swami Swarupanand =

Indian Guru (1884–1936)

Shri Swami Swarupanand Ji
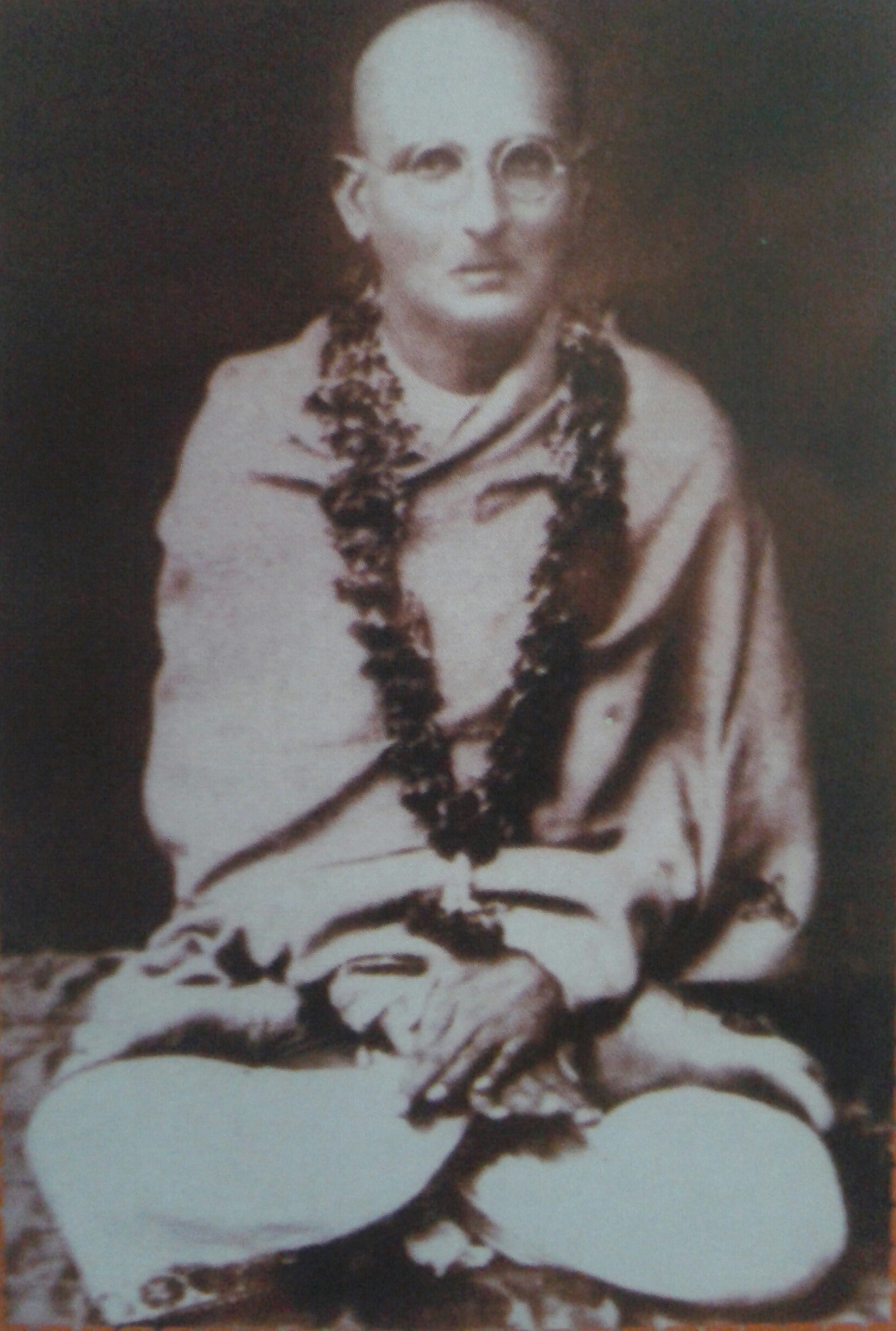
- Portrait of Swami Swarupanand Ji
- Born: 1 February 1884; Teri, British India
- Died: 9 April 1936 (aged 52); Raipur Nangli, Muzaffarnagar
- Website: www.nanglisahib.com www.nanglitirath.com

Born Shri Beli Ram Ji, Shri Swami Swarupanand Ji Maharaj (1 February 1884 – 9 April 1936), was an Indian Guru of Shri Paramhans Advait Mat lineage. He is also known as "Shri Nangli Niwasi Bhagwaan Ji", as "Hari Har Baba", as "Sadhgurudev Ji" and as "Second Guru". Born in the village of Teri in Kohat district, India (now in Pakistan), he was initiated into the sanyasas in the early 1900s in Teri by Shri Paramhans Swami Advaitanand Ji, who named him Shri Swami Swarupanand Ji. During Swami Advaitanand ji's life, Swami Swarupanand ji created an order of sanyasis (or renunciates) in northern India and founded several centers with the purpose of disseminating his master's teachings.

He died on 9 April 1936 in the village of Nangli, near Meerut. At the time of his death, Shri Swami Swarupanand Ji Maharaj had more than 10,000 followers and more than 300 ashrams in northern India. Nangli Tirath (Nangli Sahib) village in Meerut District contains his Samadhi. One of his disciples was Hans Ji Maharaj, who went on to establish the Divine Light Mission. According to another account, Shri Swami Swarupanand Ji Maharaj was succeeded by Shri Swami Vairagya Anand Ji Maharaj, also known as the third master of Shri Anandpur.

Swami Swarupanand Ji Maharaj is sometimes confused with Anand Swarup of the Radha Soami lineage.

A faqir has no particular religion: he is common to all. Wherever I go there will be no dearth of devotees, as I belong to all, and all belong to me.
