= Dongre Maharaj =

Indian spiritual leader

Ramchandra Dongreji Maharaj, popularly known as Dongre Maharaj (15 February 1926 – 8 November 1991), was an Indian spiritual leader and narrator of Bhagavata Purana, Bhagavad Gita, Ramayana katha. He was a revered figure and had huge followers in decades of 1960-1990. He was also a poet and a writer and has written more than 45 books on Bhagwad Purna, Radha Krishna and Ramayana.

== Lifesketch ==
He was born on 15 February 1926 in Indore, Madhya Pradesh, India . His mother's name was Kamalatai and his father's name was Keshav Dongre. He grew up in Vadodara.

Dongreji Maharaj was a passionate orator and Bhagavat Katha narrator. He studied at the Sannyas Ashram in Ahmedabad and Kashi and practiced Karmakand for some time. After that, he first narrated Bhagavat Katha at Saryu Temple, Ahmedabad.

He used to narrate the incidents from the divine text Srimad Bhagwatam in a pleasing manner. He was born and brought up in Gujarat. Through his divine lectures, lots of people used to change their bad habits. Youngsters, after hearing his religious lectures were highly influenced and followed righteous path in life.

Sri Dongreji Maharaj also penned poems and used to sing in praise of Lord Krishna in the temples at Gujarat. He was an ardent devotee of Lord Krishna.

Apart from performing divine lectures, Dongreji Maharaj also used to visit the popular temples, and worship the divine deities. He had performed meditation on Lord Krishna and through that, he got great spiritual powers.

He did not charge any fees for his divine lectures and donated all money collected for the benefit of poor and needy.

He died on November 8, 1990, at the Santram Temple in Nadiad. As per his wishes, his mortal remains were given a water burial in the Narmada stream at Malasar.

Many noted industrialist and personalities were either his followers or have acknowledged to have been influenced by him like Ram Niwas Lakhotia, Govind Dholakia, Swami Krishnanad to name a few.
