= Hindu sants =

Over time many men and women have reached the status of sants among their followers and among Hindus in general. Hindu sants have often renounced the world, and are variously called gurus, sadhus, rishis, swamis, muni, yogis, yoginis and other names.

Many people conflate the terms "saint" and "sant", because of their similar meanings. The term sant is a Sanskrit word "which differs significantly from the false cognate, 'saint'..." Traditionally, "sant" referred to devotional Bhakti poet-sants of two groups: Vaishnava and a group that is referred to as "Saguna Bhakti".

Some Hindu sants are given god-like status, being seen as incarnations of Vishnu, Shiva, and other aspects of God, sometimes many years after their deaths. This explains another common name for Hindu sants, "godmen".

Hindu sants have come from many walks of life including the blind (Bhima Bhoi, Surdas, and Tulsidas), orphaned (Andal, Kabir), former criminals (Kaladutaka , Valmiki) and former concubines (Kanhopatra and Shatakopa).

== See also ==
- List of Hindu gurus and sants
