= Advait Mat =

Cluster of panths in northern India

shri paramhans Advait Mat
- Official logo of the Shri Paramhans Advait Mat

Founder
- Advaitanand Ji

Religions
- Sant Mat

Website
- https://www.shrianandpur.org/

Advait Mat or Paramhans Advait Mat is a cluster of panths (groups of disciples) in northern India. It was founded by Shri Swami Advaitanand Ji Maharaj (1846–1919] , Shri Pratham Padshahi Ji. This Mat became renowned by His auspicious name as 'Shri Paramhansa Advait Mat'.

To unite the soul with the Supreme Soul through Surat-Shabd-Yoga is the goal of this Mat. To initiate the seekers and tell them the means of selfless service, Simran-Dhyan and other means of spiritual upliftment, and to make them progress on the path of Bhakti is the fundamental principle of this Mat. He declared Swami Swarupanand Ji Maharaj as his spiritual successor. Swami Swarupanand Ji Maharaj founded more than 300 ashrams with the purpose of disseminating his master's teachings. Swami Swarupanand Ji Maharaj had initiated more than thousand of his disciples into the sanyas. Many of his disciples went on to establish spiritual institutions to spread the same knowledge.

The ashrams founded by Shri Paramahans Dyal Ji were called Krishna Dwaras. The ashrams with the name Shri Anandpur Satsang Ashram are related to him and Shri Paramhans Advait Mat.

Reportedly, they perceive themselves to be from Paramhans of Kedarghat kashi

== All gurus ==
- Shri Pratham Paadshahi ji Shri Shri 108 Shri Swami Advaitanand Ji Maharaj (Shri Paramhans Dayal ji) 1846 - 1919]
- Shri Dvitiya Paadshahi ji Shri Shri 108 Swarupanand Ji Maharaj [1919 - 1936]
- Shri Tritiya Paadshahi ji Shri Shri 108 Swami Vairagyanand Ji Maharaj [1936- 1964]
- Shri Chaturth Paadshahi ji Shri Shri 108 Swami Beantanand Ji Maharaj [1964-1970]
- Shri Pancham Paadshahi ji Shri Shri 108 Swami Darshan Poornanand Ji Maharaj [1970-2017]
- Shri Shashtam Paadshahi ji Shri Shri 108 Swami Vichar Poornanand Ji Maharaj [ 2017 - present ]

== Main spiritual centre ==
- The largest and the main organization established by the spiritual master is "Shri Anandpur Dham" In Nethai,Madhya Pradesh comprising many smaller trusts in nearby areas.

Coordinates : 24°48′49.015″N 77°51′13.791″E

The Ashram of Anandpur Dham is also home to the current spiritual master.

== Major Ashrams ==
- Shri Anandpur Dham
- shri jyoti dham , canada
- shri pawan dham , new york , usa
- Shri Prayagdham Trust (Pune, Maharashtra)
- shri prem dham , karachi
- shri param shanti dham , pakistan [ tehri , kpk
- Shri Sant Nagar (Rajasthan)
- sunder dham , australia
- shri anand dham , vasant kunj delhi
- shri param dham , gwalior
- shri vivek dham , banglore
- shri divya amrit dham , amritsar
- alaukik dham , raipur and so on ........

== See also ==
- Contemporary Sant Mat movements
