= Jes Bertelsen =

Danish philosopher (born 1946)

Jes Bertelsen (born March 27, 1946), Dr. phil. in History of ideas, is a Danish spiritual teacher and author. Since 1982 he has been the leader of Vækstcenteret (i.e. "The Growth Center"), which he and his wife at the time, Hanne Kizach, founded in Norre-Snede Municipality, Denmark. His teachings are based on an experiential investigation of the nature of consciousness, using comparative analysis of Eastern and Western spiritual teachings and consciousness practices on a foundation of modern psychological, philosophical and scientific approaches. He teaches in Danish. A number of his books have been translated into German.

== Academic background ==
Bertelsen studied History of Ideas ("Idehistorie") at Aarhus University, Denmark with founder of this interdisciplinary study, Danish philosopher Professor Johannes Sløk. Bertelsen was employed and lectured at Aarhus University from 1970 to 1982. Bertelsen has written 20 books beginning with the 1972 gold medal award-winning MA thesis Kategori og afgørelse, strukturer i Kirkegaards tænkning ('Category and decision, structures in the thinking of Kirkegaard'). His most recent book is from 2008, "Bevidsthedens flydende lys - Betragtninger over begrebet apperception hos Immanuel Kant og Longchenpa" ('The flowing light of consciousness – Reflections on the concept of apperception in Kant and Longchenpa'). His 1974 doctoral dissertation was entitled: Ouroboros – en undersøgelse af selvets strukturer ('Ouroboros – a study of the structures of the self'). In the later part of his authorship he more or less departs from the academic tradition and focuses on psychology, self-development and philosophy of consciousness seen in relationship to meditative instructions. From around 2006 he has also been involved in scientific inquiry into the neurological results of meditative practice. In 2009 he was co-author of an article published in the scientific journal NeuroReport: "Long-term meditation is associated with increased gray matter density in the brain stem".

== Spiritual teacher ==
From 1978 to the early 1980s Bertelsen was in an ongoing training with the Irish healer Bob Moore, whose understanding of the human energy system had roots in the theosophical tradition. In Bertelsen's early work this influence is seen in his focus on the connections between ordinary consciousness, the chakra system, non-physical energy systems, symbols from dream states, states of expanded consciousness and clairvoyance. Among Bertelsen's sources of inspiration are also the descriptions of the Christ in the Gospel of Thomas, and the Heart prayer of Eastern Orthodox Christianity. The Eastern Tantric traditions have been a source of inspiration in his work on the relationship between vital energy, sexuality, love and spirituality.

Bertelsen maintains that it is possible to train the mind, and he sees meditative practice as a gradual progression towards both quieting the mind and allowing greater empathic openness and heartfelt presence. Like many other voices in the international dialogue about consciousness, spirituality and religion he thinks it is possible to free the universal elements of spiritual practice from traditional religious contexts and make them available for general use. For this purpose he has created simple and generally applicable teaching tools that teachers can use with school children.

In several of his books, Bertelsen describes the unique possibilities and challenges inherent in the secularized Scandinavian societies for developing an experientially based spirituality. He emphasizes a distinction between an inherent spirituality shared by everyone, and the individual option of actively training and developing what he refers to as spiritual intelligence. In his view such an effort is to be based on "democratic understanding, openness toward the Christian cultural values, equality between men and women and a scientific approach".

== Categorizing Bertelsen in comparative religion ==
The Danish religious sociologist Helle Hinge has characterized Bertelsen as an example of the New Age movement. In the Danish encyclopedia, Den Store Danske Encyklopædi, religious historian Mikael Rothstein describes Bertelsen as being "the center of an actual religious formation", and erroneously describes Bertelsen as a "depth psychologist". However, Bertelsen emphatically refutes both the New Age and religious labels. About the New Age worldview he has said that it contains numerous sensible elements, but that it can also be superficial and characterized by promises of quick solutions.

== Criticism ==
The late leader of the Christian apologetic Danish organization Dialogcenteret, Johannes Aagaard, has criticized Bertelsen for mixing Christian and Eastern traditions, and has classified him as "one of the most influential writers and ideologists among the new religious groupings in Denmark" and later as gnostic. A similarly Christian faith-based criticism has been put forth since 2006 by Annette Leleur and Frank Robert Pedersen, both connected to Vækstcenteret until the early 1990s. Since 2007 they have publicized their criticisms in Danish under the name Infogruppen. In their view Bertelsen represents a form of elitist thinking which they find irreconcilable with the foundational principles of democracy. They find it particularly reprehensible that Bertelsen in later years has focused on developing teaching tools for awareness training and spirituality in the public school system, since they find that a person with Bertelsen's background is unable to do so impartially.

== Bibliography ==
- ’’Kategori og afgørelse - Strukturer i Kierkegaards tænkning’’, (1972). Gold medal award winning MA thesis (Category and decision – Structures in the thinking of Kirkegaard)
- ’’Ouroboros – en undersøgelse af selvets strukturer’’, (1974), doctoral thesis, ISBN 87-418-4014-3, (Ouroboros – a study of the structures of the self)
- ’’Individuation’’, (1975), ISBN 87-418-3521-2
- ’’Dybdepsykologi 1 – fødselstraumets psykologi’’, (1978), ISBN 87-418-4768-7, (Depth Psychology 1 – the psychology of the birth trauma)
- ’’Dybdepsykologi 2 – genfødslens psykologi’’, (1979), ISBN 87-418-4930-2, (Depth Psychology 2 – the psychology of rebirth)
- ’’Dybdepsykologi 3 – den vestlige meditations psykologi’’, (1980), ISBN 87-418-2811-9, (Depth Psychology 3 – the psychology of Western meditation)
- ’’ Dybdepsykologi 4 – en østlig meditations psykologi, (1983), ISBN 87-418-5249-4, (Depth Psychology 4 – a psychology of Eastern meditation)
- ’’Drømme, chakrasymboler og meditation’’, (1982), ISBN 87-418-1070-8, (Dreams, chakra symbols and meditation)
- ’’Højere bevidsthed’’, (1983), ISBN 87-418-6926-5, (Higher consciousness)
- ’’Energi og bevidsthed’’, (1984), ISBN 87-418-7320-3, (Energy and consciousness)
- ’’Kvantespring – en bog om kærlighed’’, (1986), ISBN 87-418-7901-5, (Quantum leap – a book about love)
- ’’Selvets virkelighed’’, (1988), ISBN 87-418-8489-2, (The reality of the self)
- ’’Indre tantra’’, (1989), ISBN 87-418-8844-8, (Inner tantra)
- ’’Kristusprocessen ’’, (1989), ISBN 87-418-8937-1, (The Christ Process)
- ’’Bevidsthedens befrielse’’, (1991), ISBN 87-418-6211-2, (Liberation of consciousness)
- ’’Nuets himmel’’, (1994), ISBN 87-21-00193-6, (Heaven present)
- ’’Hjertebøn og ikonmystik’’, (1996), ISBN 87-21-00365-3, (Heart prayer and icon mysticism)
- ’’Bevidsthedens inderste’’, (1999), ISBN 87-7357-761-8, (Innermost consciousness)
- ’’Dzogchenpraksis som bevidsthedsvidde’’, (2003), ISBN 87-621-0434-9, (Dzogchen practice as width of consciousness)
- ’’Bevidsthedens flydende lys - Betragtninger over begrebet apperception hos Immanuel Kant og Longchenpa’’ (2008), ISBN 87-638-0780-7, (The flowing light of consciousness – Reflections on the concept of apperception in Kant and Longchenpa),
- ’’Long-term meditation is associated with increased gray matter density in the brain stem’’ by Peter Vestergaard-Poulsen, Martijn van Beek, Joshua Skewes, Carsten R. Bjarkam, Michael Stubberup, Jes Bertelsen and Andreas Roepstorff. NeuroReport, 2009, Volume 20, issue 2, pp 170–174
- Kan man lære børn selvberoenhed og empati? (Can children be taught self reliance and empathy?) in the Danish journal Kognition & pædagogik. - Vol. 19, no. 71 (2009), p. 24-30.
