= Jason Scott case =

Case against a deprogrammer

Scott v. Ross
- Court: United States Court of Appeals for the Ninth Circuit
- Full case name: Jason Scott v. Rick Ross, aka Rickey Allen Ross; Mark Workman; Charles Simpson, and Cult Awareness Network, a California Non-Profit Corp.
- Decided: September 1995 (jury verdict); April 8, 1998 (Court of Appeals decision)
- Citation: 140 F.3d 1275 (9th Cir. 1998)

Case history
- Prior action: Jury verdict in favor of plaintiff
- Subsequent actions: Rehearing En Banc denied, August 26, 1998, 151 F.3d 1247. Certiorari denied March 22, 1999, 526 U.S. 1033.

Court membership
- Judges sitting: Mary M. Schroeder, Robert Beezer, & William Schwarzer

Case opinions
- Majority: Beezer; Dissent: Schwarzer

The Jason Scott case was a United States civil suit, brought against deprogrammer Rick Ross, two of his associates, and the Cult Awareness Network (CAN), for the abduction and failed deprogramming of Jason Scott, a member of the United Pentecostal Church International. Scott was eighteen years old at the time of the abduction and thus legally an adult. CAN was a co-defendant because a CAN contact person had referred Scott's mother to Rick Ross. In the trial, Jason Scott was represented by Kendrick Moxon, a prominent Scientologist attorney.

The nine-member jury unanimously held the defendants liable for conspiracy to deprive Scott of his civil rights and religious liberties. In addition, the jury held that Ross and his associates (but not CAN) "intentionally or recklessly acted in a way so outrageous in character and so extreme in degree as to go beyond all possible bounds of decency and to be regarded as atrocious and utterly intolerable in a civilized community." The case resulted in an award of $875,000 in compensatory damages and punitive damages in the amount of $1,000,000 against CAN, $2,500,000 against Ross, and $250,000 against each of Ross's two associates.

The case bankrupted the Cult Awareness Network, and its name, phone number, records and files were obtained by Scientologists.

== Prior events ==
In January 1991, at the time of the failed deprogramming attempt, Jason Scott, of Bellevue, Washington, was an 18-year-old member of the Life Tabernacle Church, affiliated with the United Pentecostal Church International. Scott's mother, Katherine Tonkin, had previously been a member of the church, but had withdrawn from it. Jason and two younger sons of hers disagreed with her decision and insisted they would remain in the church.

The two younger sons then left Tonkin's household, the youngest, aged thirteen, going to live with his grandmother, and the second-youngest, sixteen, moving in with another family from the church. Jason remained at home at first, but subsequently also moved in with his grandmother.

Tonkin, who believed a pastor in the church had behaved inappropriately toward one of her younger sons, subsequently called the local Cult Awareness Network (CAN) hotline. The CAN contact person, Shirley Landa, referred her to Rick Ross; based on her endorsement of Ross, Tonkin retained him to deprogram her sons. At the time, Ross still performed forcible deprogrammings, a fact that Landa was aware of. Landa had had a longstanding relationship with CAN; she had founded its predecessor organization, and was a former member of CAN's board.

== Deprogramming ==
To facilitate the deprogramming, Ross put together a two-man "security team". The three traveled to the grandmother's home, locked the two youngest children in the basement, and following several days of argument and lecturing, the boys gave up their Pentecostal beliefs. For deprogramming Jason, Ross demanded a larger fee, since he was powerfully built and legally an adult, increasing the risk of prosecution. Ross hired a karate black belt named Clark Rotroff to help with the operation. One evening, as Scott returned to the family residence, he was surprised by Ross's three associates, wrestled to the ground, and dragged into a waiting van.

Scott struggled, but was held down and handcuffed by the three men, gagged with duct tape from ear to ear, and had his ankles tied with rope. As he lay face down and with his cuffed hands beneath his body, one of the men, weighing 300 pounds, sat on top of his back. Scott's legs, upper body and back had sustained multiple bruises and abrasions from being dragged to the van across stairs, floors and a patio.

Scott was driven to a beach cottage, where the rope around his ankles was loosened sufficiently to enable him to make steps. Ross and his partners walked him into the house, one of the men leading him on a nylon leash, another holding his handcuffs. Ross and his partners had made the house a virtual prison; the windows were covered with thick nylon straps forming a mesh, to prevent escape. The two doors to the room where he was held were guarded. His captors also took his shoes and fitted the room with motion detectors. According to Shupe and Darnell's (2006) account of court testimony, Scott demanded that he be allowed to leave, and asked Ross whether he would try to make him change his religious beliefs. Ross was said to have replied that that was what he was paid to do. When Scott threatened Ross with criminal prosecution, Ross was said to have threatened Scott that he would handcuff him to the bed frame.

Scott testified that he then endured five days of derogatory comments about himself, his beliefs, his girlfriend and his pastor, and diatribes by Ross about the ways in which Christianity and conservative Protestantism were wrong. He was intimidated, forced to watch videos on cults and told his church was just the same. He said he was watched 24 hours a day. On every visit to the bathroom, he was accompanied by at least two men. Every day, Ross argued with Scott about matters of religion, without giving him a chance to say anything in return, often tapping him or hitting him on the head to underscore his points while Scott was being restrained or closely watched. Scott was told that he would only regain his liberty once the deprogramming had been concluded successfully and he had given up his beliefs.

After four days, Scott began to pretend that he had changed his mind, feigning tears and remorse, in the hope that this would in due course give him a chance to escape. The final day of his imprisonment he spent watching films on New Age religions and channeling, even though neither are related to Pentecostalism. Scott's plan ultimately worked; Ross, pleased with the apparent success of the deprogramming session, proposed that they all go out to meet with Scott's family for a celebratory dinner. In the restaurant, Scott was allowed to go the restroom by himself; he ran out and called the police, who arrested Ross and his companions on suspicion of unlawful imprisonment. Initially, the charges were dismissed.

== Trials ==
=== Criminal ===
In 1993, two years later, criminal charges were brought against Ross and two of his associates for unlawful imprisonment during the deprogramming. At the trial, Ross's defense lawyer argued that Ross "was hired to deprogram Scott but that others who restrained Scott were not under Ross's control." The trial ended in acquittal for Ross. Jurors said "prosecutors had not proved Ross participated in restraining Scott." Grays Harbor County prosecutor Joe Wheeler said "he was surprised by the jury's verdict", arrived at after two hours of deliberation. Mark Workman and Charles Simpson pleaded guilty to the lesser charge of coercion and were sentenced to one-year jail terms, with all but 30 days suspended. The third associate, Clark Rotroff, also from Arizona, testified for the prosecution and was not charged.

=== Civil ===
In addition to the criminal trial, a civil suit for damages was filed against Ross, the two convicted associates and CAN by Kendrick Moxon, a long-time member and counsel for the Church of Scientology, on behalf of Jason Scott. Moxon took the case pro bono. The case led to renewed debate on the deprogramming issue. At the trial, the jury was tasked to decide whether the defendants had violated Scott's civil rights, including the right "to practice and believe in the religion of his choice, free from force, violence, threats, retaliation or intimidation." Anson Shupe appeared in the trial as an expert academic witness for Scott, giving testimony as to "the entrepreneurial nature of deprogramming and its origins in religious intolerance".

Ross's defense lawyer argued that since Scott was powerfully built, it had made sense to bring along others "for security", but that Ross's role had been "limited to counseling and providing information". "Mr. Ross had no physical contact with Mr. Scott," his attorney said. "He did what he was intended to do – provide information." CAN's defense asserted that none of CAN's leaders or employees were aware of the deprogramming.

In September 1995, a nine-member jury unanimously held the defendants liable for negligence and conspiracy to deprive Scott of his civil rights and religious liberties. In relation to the negligence charge, the jury attributed 70% of the total combined negligence to Ross, and 10% each to CAN and his two associates. In addition, the jury held the defendants, excluding CAN, liable for intentional infliction of emotional distress, finding they "intentionally or recklessly acted in a way so outrageous in character and so extreme in degree as to go beyond all possible bounds of decency and to be regarded as atrocious and utterly intolerable in a civilized community."

The descriptions of the forcible nature of the kidnapping and deprogramming attempt seemed to have made an impact on the jury, who awarded $875,000 in compensatory damages to Jason Scott, and punitive damages in the amount of $1,000,000 against CAN, $2,500,000 against Ross, and $250,000 against each of Ross's two co-defendants. The court found that CAN volunteers routinely referred callers to deprogrammers.

After the jury decision, Scott said "he thought the amount of the award was justified." Moxon said he thought "the decision and the large award for punitive damages set an important precedent and would deter other religious deprogrammers." United States District Judge John C. Coughenour pronounced the verdict "quite reasonable" and refused a motion to grant a new trial, stating:

Finally, the court notes each of the defendants' seeming incapability of appreciating the maliciousness of their conduct towards Mr. Scott. Rather, throughout the entire course of this litigation, they have attempted to portray themselves as victims of Mr. Scott's counsel's alleged agenda. Thus, the large award given by the jury against both the CAN and Mr. Ross seems reasonably necessary to enforce the jury's determination on the oppressiveness of the defendants' actions and deter similar conduct in the future.

CAN tendered the claim to its insurance and the insurance company paid CAN the award. But instead of satisfying the judgment, CAN used the money to finance its appeal of the judgment. The three-judge panel of the 9th U.S. Circuit Court of Appeals upheld the award in April 1998, two of the three judges finding against CAN, with the third judge dissenting. In August 1998, the full 9th Circuit court voted against reconsidering the case. The U.S. Supreme Court rejected a final appeal by CAN in March 1999.

Unable to pay the judgment from its remaining resources, and beleaguered by legal suits from other alleged victims and members (some of which were financed by the Church of Scientology), CAN declared bankruptcy in 1996. The Church of Scientology bought the CAN name all its assets from the bankruptcy trustee, as told in further detail below. Ross declared bankruptcy as well.

== Outcome ==
In November 1996, the CAN name, logo and telephone number were bought in Bankruptcy Court by another Scientologist attorney, Steven Hayes, whose partner Timothy Bowles had at one time been partners with Moxon. According to Moxon, Scott had not collected any part of his judgment at that time, as both CAN and Ross had declared bankruptcy. In early December, Scott reconciled with his mother and settled with Ross for $5,000, and 200 hours of professional services to be supplied by Ross. Moxon filed unsuccessful emergency motions alleging that Scott must have been coerced, but admitted he had no proof of this. In December 1996, Scott replaced Moxon as his attorney with Church of Scientology opponent Graham Berry.

The settlement between Scott and Ross was leaked to the Washington Post, which reportedly angered Scott. Berry, his new attorney, said that "it would be a mistake to assume that Scott's decision to make use of Ross' time was a vindication of Ross or his deprogramming methods," and refused to say what services Ross would supply under the agreement. Berry also pointed out that the Church of Scientology had "had a long-standing campaign to destroy the Cult Awareness Network" and asserted that the destruction of CAN had been in the interest of Moxon's main client, the Church of Scientology, rather than in Scott's interest.

The Jason Scott case brought about the demise of the "Old CAN", marking the end of the cult wars in North America. Controversies surrounding new religious movements have continued, but the debate has mostly moved to other arenas than the courts. With the Scott decision, deprogramming came to an almost complete halt in North America, and the practice was largely given up in favor of voluntary exit counseling. After acquiring the CAN name and telephone number, the Church of Scientology established a "New CAN", which serves as an information and networking center on nontraditional religions; it is managed by former opponents of the "Old CAN".

According to religion scholar J. Gordon Melton, head of the Institute for the Study of American Religion at UC Santa Barbara, "The Scott case virtually brought deprogramming to a halt in this country" "What this judgment does ... is cut the communication lines that allow deprogramming to go forward"

== See also ==
- Anti-cult movement
