= ScienTOMogy =

New Zealand organization

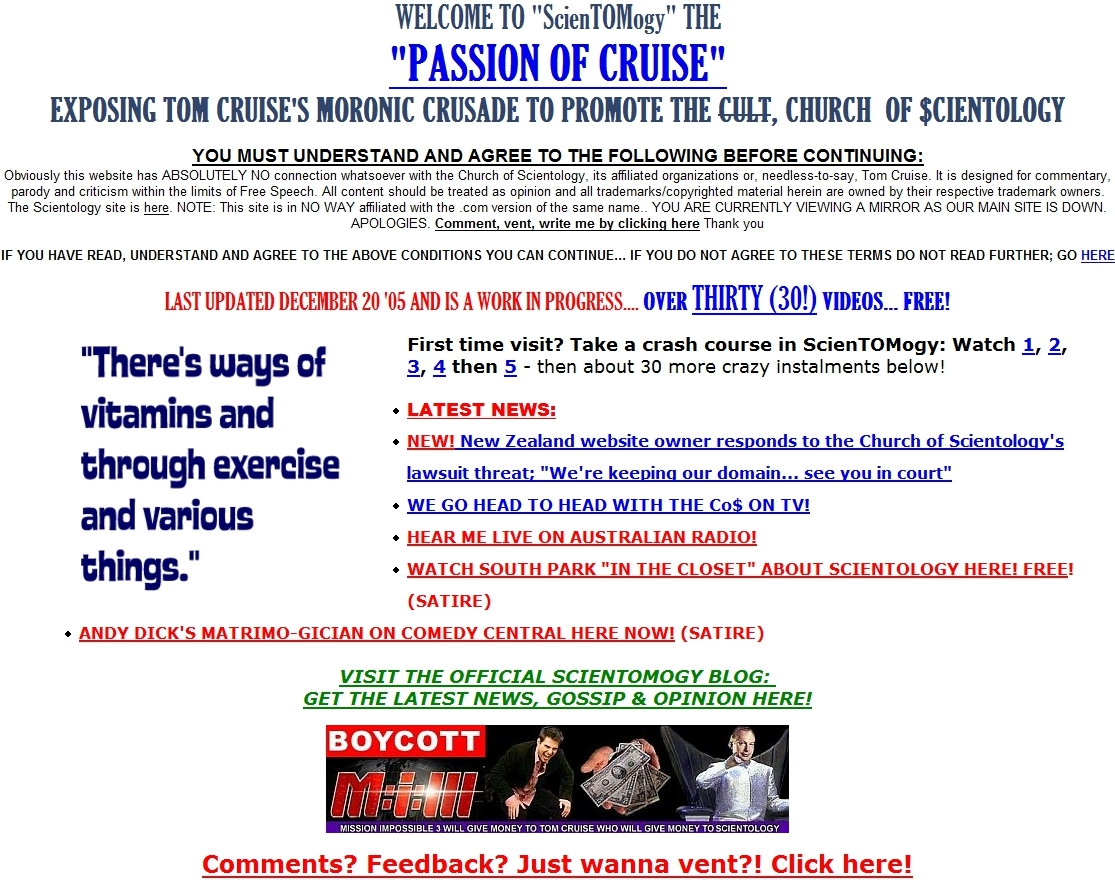
- Screenshot of ScienTOMogy, November 11, 2005
- Formation: July 2005
- Type: Parody Web site
- Location: New Zealand
- Official language: English

ScienTOMogy was a New Zealand–based parody site lampooning actor Tom Cruise's involvement with Scientology. Initially hosted at the domain name scientomogy.info, the site was created in 2005 in response to the extensive media publicity surrounding Cruise's appearances on The Oprah Winfrey Show and The Today Show.

ScienTOMogy gained press attention after the site proprietor was contacted by the Church of Scientology with a cease and desist letter, alleging copyright infringement by claiming the word "Scientomogy" was too close to the word "Scientology". The proprietor initially agreed to relent to the Church's demands, but then decided to keep the site after consulting with attorneys. Internet traffic to the site later increased dramatically as a result of the media attention surrounding the Church of Scientology's allegations of copyright infringement.

== Development ==
New Zealand webmaster Glen Stollery created scientomogy.info in July 2005, after Tom Cruise appeared on The Today Show in an interview speaking about "the dangers of prescription drugs," and following the incident where he jumped the couch over his love for Katie Holmes during an interview on The Oprah Winfrey Show. The site's stated goal was "exposing Tom Cruise's moronic behavior in his relentless crusade to promote the Church of Scientology".

The site was mainly used to store parody and satire material, including depictions of Cruise and Holmes in straitjackets, as well as a video showing Cruise shooting lightning at Oprah Winfrey. To clarify its position as a parody site, ScienTOMogy contained a disclaimer, which it requested that the reader understand and agree to before continuing. The site's disclaimer stated "Obviously www.scienTOMogy.info has ABSOLUTELY NO connection whatsoever with the Church of Scientology, it’s [sic] affiliated organizations or, needless-to-say, Tom Cruise. It is designed for commentary and criticism within the limits of Free Speech. All content should be treated as opinion and all trademarks/copyrighted material herein are owned by their respective trademark owners. The Scientology site is here. Thank you. You may continue..." On the site, a fake Cruise claims that the Church of Scientology should refer to itself as "ScienTOMogy" instead of Scientology, in order to clear up public relations problems. The parody version of Cruise states "It's kind of like the word gummy bears. Bears by themselves are scary, but if you just add the word gummy to it, it now becomes a fun, enjoyable treat."

== Church of Scientology's response ==
The Web site drew media attention when the Church of Scientology's attorneys Moxon & Kobrin contacted Stollery, claiming the ScienTOMogy domain name was an infringement of their trademark, despite being a different word by one letter. In September 2005, the Church of Scientology sent a cease and desist email to Stollery demanding he shut down the site and transfer ownership of the domain name to the Church, threatening him with a $100,000 lawsuit. The Church's law firm stated that "ScienTOMogy" would cause a likelihood of confusion with "Scientology," violating the Lanham Act, 15 U.S.C. 1125(a). The Church of Scientology's email stated "You are hereby on notice that the registration and use of this domain name in this fashion has caused your name to be falsely associated with our client's registered mark, SCIENTOLOGY [...] The fact that you have changed one letter [...] does not protect you from trademark infringement". Helena Kobrin, a lawyer for the Church of Scientology, was quoted as saying "You can't use somebody's trademark, regardless of what you're saying, if you haven't been given permission".

ScienTOMogy responded with a statement, "The site is purely satirical and is for entertainment. It contains no fact nor claims to do so. The site clearly states in its header, 'This site has absolutely no connection whatsoever with the Church of Scientology, it's [sic] affiliated organisations or, needless to say, Tom Cruise'." Stollery originally relented and agreed to change the domain name to "passionofcruise.info" on October 13, 2005, which E! News took to be a parody of the film The Passion of the Christ.

After consulting with his lawyers in October 2005, Stollery responded to the Church with a far more aggressive stance. Now believing the accusation to be completely frivolous, Stollery publicly refused, challenging the Church with "I'm keeping my domain, see you in court". Again in an interview with One News, Stollery reiterated that he was going to retain rights to "ScienTOMogy", and not transfer the domain name to the Church of Scientology, as they had requested. After the media attention, Stollery said he began to receive "annoying calls" from local Scientologists. "The first few I was stupid enough to answer, but now they just call and call and call. When I did speak to 'a church member here in Auckland' he kept insisting over and over that we meet to talk about my 'vendetta' with the church."

== Aftermath ==
The threats gave the Web site a cult following of its own, taking its normal traffic from one hundred hits per day to one million in a matter of hours. The Wall Street Journal carried reports commenting on the irony of the situation, noting the site's message that the press exposure due to the threats from the Church of Scientology had increased its traffic over tenfold. Mel Gibson has not raised objections to use of the parody term "PassionofCruise". E! News reported that though Stollery had originally agreed to take down the site, it was still running and accessible as of July 2006, when the United Nations' World Intellectual Property Organization awarded Cruise rights to the domain name "TomCruise.com" over claims of a cybersquatter.

In addition to hosting the original cease and desist letter, the Berkman Center for Internet & Society also gives legal commentary on various issues pertaining to the ScienTOMogy controversy at a page provided by the organization Chilling Effects. They discuss "trademark tarnishment", which may occur if a non-owner of a trademark uses the work in an "activity that is likely to offend the average person". However, the page also notes that the tarnishment would be non-actionable if the usage was non-commercial or parody. The Church of Scientology has not since filed a lawsuit or opened litigation on "Scientomogy," and the site scientomogy.info no longer exists except in archives.

== See also ==
- Scientology and the Internet
- Scientology controversy
- Scientology and law
