= Tim Bowles =

Tim Bowles may refer to:

- Tim Bowles (attorney), American attorney
- Tim Bowles (politician) (born 1959/60), British politician
- Timothy Bowles (American politician), former state legislator from Connecticut's 42nd House of Representatives district
