= Nancy Ammerman =

American sociologist

Nancy Tatom Ammerman (born 1950) is an American professor of sociology of religion at Boston University School of Theology.

== Life ==
In 1984, Ammerman joined the faculty of Emory University. Her book, Baptist Battles, won the 1992 Distinguished Book Award from the Society for the Scientific Study of Religion. In 1995, Ammerman left Emory University to teach at Hartford Seminary. Since 2003, she has been at Boston University. In 2020 she became an honorary doctor at Uppsala University.

== The Branch Davidians Siege Episode ==
She was one of a panel of academics commissioned in 1993 by the U.S. government to analyze what went wrong in its dealings with the Branch Davidians at Waco. Ammerman's report concludes that neither the ATF nor the FBI took David Koresh seriously as a religious man, but rather adopted the "anti-cult" point of view of deprogrammer Rick Ross. She wrote

[...] the most up lifting finding was the FBI's near total dismissal of the religious beliefs of the Branch Davidians. For these men, David Koresh was a sociopath, and his followers were hostages. Religion was a convenient cover for Koresh's desire to control his followers and monopolize all the rewards for himself. They saw no reason to try to understand his religious beliefs, indeed thought them so bizarre as to be incomprehensible by normal people.2 The negotiators expressed deep regret at this state of affairs, but could see no alternatives to the way they had come to understand the situation. The tactical commanders had no real regret, seeing the final outcome as unavoidable.

Ammerman disputes the view that Koresh's followers were "hostages", noting that some of them left their Mount Carmel Center between the initial ATF raid and the last day of the standoff. She also criticizes the Justice Department for ignoring the recommendations of FBI agents, who suggested taking Koresh's religious faith as (at least possibly) sincere and backing off instead of applying ever-increasing pressure.

She also wrote:

The efforts by Arnold and James Tabor represented probably the best hope for a peaceful end to the siege. By working within Koresh's biblical system, they had suggested to him an alternative reading of critical passages in the book (Revelation). By this reading, Koresh should have written or recorded his explanation of the seven seals. The prophesied destruction of the true believers would not have taken place, in this reading, for a long time. The Davidians would have been free to leave their settlement and deal with the government to resolve their differences. Koresh evidently took this teaching and began his interpretive writing. In his last letter, written the week before the fiery end, he stated that he intended to come out when it was complete. The FBI, however, did not take this scenario seriously or believe that Koresh would actually write the document.

She testified during the U.S. Senate Judiciary Committee Hearings of July/August 1995. She was asked by then U.S. Senator Russel D. Feingold of Wisconsin regards the reported "allegations of violence and instances of child abuse" that were levied against the Branch Davidians. She noted that these allegations are a common response on the part of society in response to groups with unfamiliar beliefs.

== Works ==
Ammerman's work has focused on American congregations. Her most recent book, Pillars of Faith: American Congregations and their Partners (University of California Press, 2005), describes the common patterns that shape the work of American's diverse communities of faith. Her 1997 book, Congregation and Community, tells the stories of twenty-three congregations that encountered various forms of neighborhood change in communities around the country. Along with a team of others, she edited and contributed to Studying Congregations: A New Handbook.

- Ammerman, Nancy T (Ed.). Everyday Religion: Observing Modern Religious Lives. (New York: Oxford University Press, 2006).
- Ammerman, Nancy T. Pillars of Faith: American Congregations and their Partners ( University of California Press, 2005). WINNER, 2005 Distinguished Book Award, Sociology of Religion section, American Sociological Association.
- Dudley, Carl S., and Nancy T. Ammerman. Congregations in Transition. (San Francisco: Jossey Bass, 2002).
- Ammerman, Nancy T., Jackson Carroll, Carl S. Dudley, and William McKinney (eds.). Studying Congregations: A New Handbook. (Nashville: Abingdon, 1998).
- Ammerman, Nancy Tatom. Congregation and Community. (New Brunswick: Rutgers University Press, 1997).
- Ammerman, Nancy T. and Wade Clark Roof (eds.). Work, Family, and Religion in Contemporary Society. (New York: Routledge, 1995).
- Ammerman, Nancy T. (ed.) Accounting for Christian Fundamentalisms. in Accounting for Fundamentalisms, Martin E. Marty and R. Scott Appleby (eds.). (Chicago: University of Chicago Press, 1994).
- Ammerman, Nancy T. (ed.). Southern Baptists Observed: Multiple Perspectives on a Changing Denomination. (Knoxville: University of Tennessee Press, 1993).
- Ammerman, Nancy Tatom. Baptist Battles: Social Change and Religious Conflict in the Southern Baptist Convention. (New Brunswick, NJ: Rutgers University Press, 1990). WINNER, 1992 Distinguished Book Award, Society for the Scientific Study of Religion. Portions reprinted in Sociology: The Central Questions, 2nd ed., by William Kornblum (Harcourt, 2001).
- Ammerman, Nancy Tatom. Bible Believers: Fundamentalists in the Modern World. (New Brunswick, NJ: Rutgers University Press, 1987). Portions reprinted in Religion North American Style, ed. by Thomas E. Dowdy (Rutgers University Press, 1996); and The Practical Skeptic: Readings in Sociology, by Lisa J. McIntyre (Mayfield, 2001).
