= Rick Alan Ross =

American anti-cult activist (born 1952)

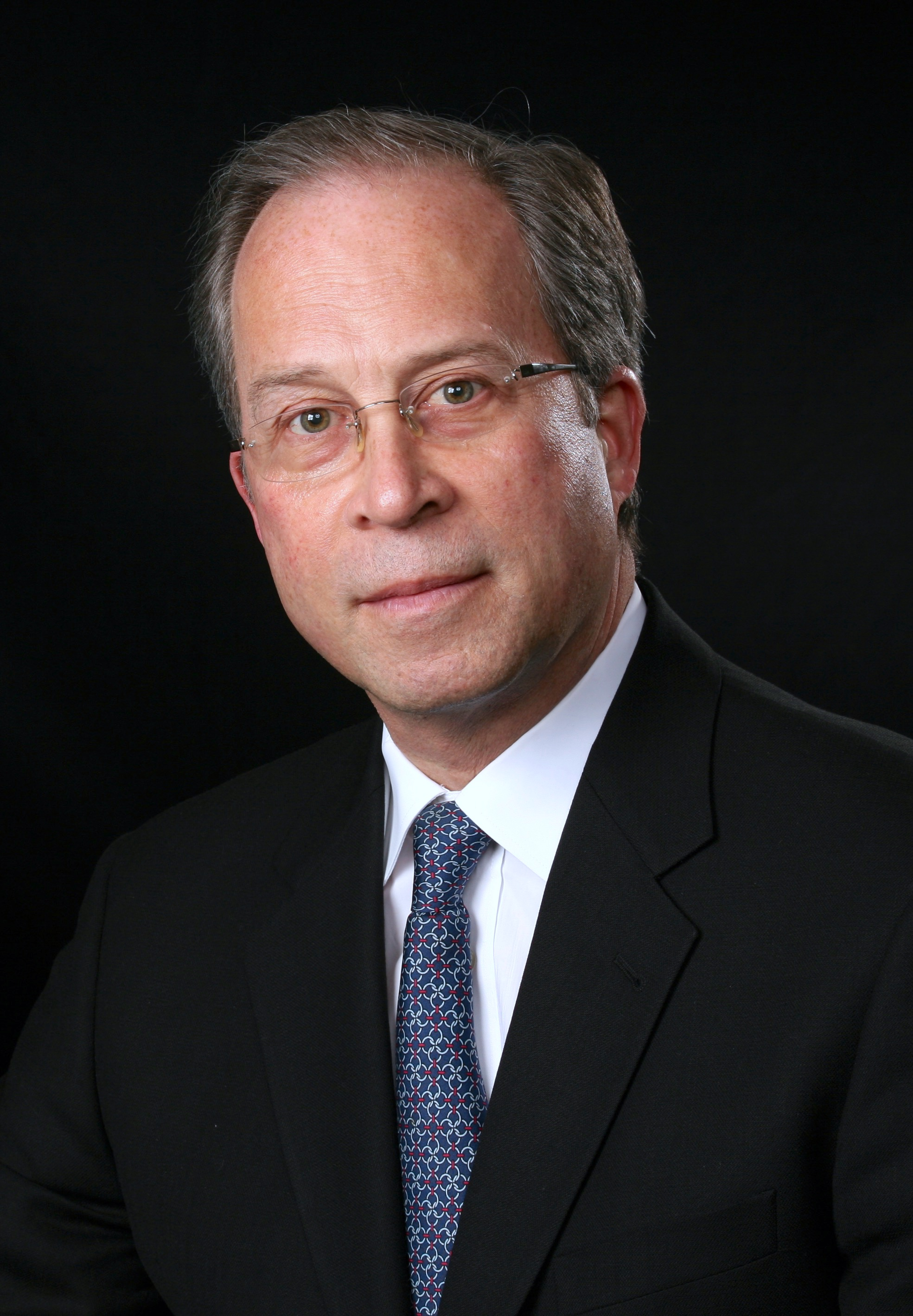
- Ross in 2014
- Born: 1952 (age 73–74); Cleveland, Ohio, U.S.
- Occupations: Deprogrammer, cult specialist, founder and executive director of the Cult Education Institute
- Website: culteducation.com

Rick Alan Ross (born 1952) is an American deprogrammer, cult specialist, and founder and executive director of the nonprofit Cult Education Institute. He frequently appears in the news and other media discussing groups some consider cults. Ross has intervened in more than 500 deprogramming cases in various countries.

Ross faced criminal charges of unlawful imprisonment over a 1991 forcible deprogramming of United Pentecostal Church International member Jason Scott; a jury acquitted him at trial. In 1995, a civil lawsuit filed by Scott resulted in a multimillion-dollar judgement against Ross and his co-defendants. Later, Ross and Scott reached a settlement in which Ross agreed to pay Scott US$5,000 and provide 200 hours of professional services at no charge.

Ross was the only deprogrammer to work with members of the Branch Davidians prior to the Waco siege; some scholars later criticized his involvement with the siege.

== Early life ==
Ross was born in 1952 in Cleveland, Ohio, and moved to Phoenix, Arizona in 1956. His mother worked for the Jewish Community Center and his father was a plumber. He was raised and went to school in Arizona with the exception of one year that he was sent to the Camden Military Academy in South Carolina. He graduated from Phoenix Union High School in 1971.

After high school, Ross worked for two years at a finance company and at a bank. In his twenties, during a period of unemployment, he got into legal trouble. In 1974, he was charged, along with a friend, for the attempted burglary of a model home. He pleaded guilty to trespassing and was sentenced to probation. In 1975, he was charged with grand theft, again with a friend, for embezzling over $50,000 worth of jewelry from a shop where the friend worked. All the stolen items were returned to the store; he pleaded guilty, and was sentenced to four more years of probation, which was terminated early. While he was on probation, he worked for a cousin's car salvage business. During an interview with the New York Daily News in 2004, Ross said, "I was young and foolish and made mistakes that I deeply regret. I did whatever the court required, completed my probation in 1979, and the guilty verdicts were vacated in 1983. I have gone on with my life and never again got in that kind of trouble."

== Career ==
Ross became concerned about extremist organizations in 1982 when he learned that a fringe religious group had encouraged missionaries to become employees at his grandmother's nursing home where they were targeting elderly residents for conversion to Messianic Judaism. According to Ross, the missionaries were threatening Jewish residents, many of whom had survived persecution in Europe, that they would burn in hell if they did not convert. Ross told this to the home's director and the local Jewish community and campaigned to have the group's activities stopped.

Following the incident at his grandmother's nursing home, Ross continued his involvement in the organized Jewish community and worked with the Jewish Federation of Greater Phoenix to write a brochure on the cult phenomenon in Arizona. This led the Union for Reform Judaism to appoint Ross to two national committees focused on cults and inter-religious affairs and he also volunteered as a lecturer and researcher for the denomination.

In 1983, Ross started working for Jewish Family and Children's Services (JFCS) in Phoenix as the coordinator for the Jewish Prisoners Program, which he founded. His work in the prison system covered social services for Jewish inmates, advocating for their religious rights, and providing education regarding hate groups. In addition, he chaired the Coalition of Jewish Prisoners Programs, the umbrella organization for an international group of human services agencies providing assistance to Jewish inmates and their families. He also served on the religious advisory committee for the Arizona Department of Corrections and was later elected as its chairman. From his work in the prison system, Ross discovered that prisoners were a prime target for cult groups and through his role on the religious advisory committee, he helped develop a policy on proselytizing to inmates. He also worked for Phoenix Bureau of Jewish Education, designing a curriculum and teaching.

In 1986, Ross left JFCS to become a full-time private consultant and deprogrammer, a role which has been widely criticized. (Note: Deprogramming is a controversial tactic. Sociologists Anson Shupe and David Bromley note that deprogramming involves "kidnappings, forcible detentions, and exorcism-like rituals" of unwilling participants. According to John E. LeMoult, deprogramming is often "far more like 'brainwashing' than the conversion process by which members join various sects." Key court cases have found deprogramming to be illegal for violating the constitutional rights of members of new religious movements.) Despite involving himself in many coercive interventions against individuals involved in new religious movements, Ross has no education or credentials in religion and no formal training in counselling or psychology. Ross worked as a deprogrammer with the Cult Awareness Network (CAN).

In 1989, the CBS television program 48 Hours covered Ross's deprogramming of a 14-year-old boy, Aaron Paron, a member of the Potter's House Christian Fellowship. According to his mother, when she distanced herself from the church, Aaron began viewing her as "possessed by the devil"; he became suicidal and ran away from home, refusing to leave the organization. Aaron's mother had made multiple calls to the police and, prior to filming, Potter's House entered into an agreement that they would not have contact with or harbor the minor, entice him away from his mother, attempt to influence his behavior, or take any action that would interfere with his mother's parental rights. The program focused on Ross's efforts to persuade the boy to view Potter's House as "a destructive Bible-based group" which took control of its members' lives. According to a review in The New York Times, the 48-hour intervention apparently persuaded Aaron that his mother was not possessed by the Devil and that Potter's House was not what it seemed. In a closing scene filmed three weeks later, Aaron's psychologist assured his mother that Aaron was "back in the land of the living now".

=== Waco siege ===
In 1987, Ross deprogrammed two former members of the Branch Davidians in upstate New York, and in 1988 began receiving calls about the Davidian group led by David Koresh in Waco, Texas. Ross was the only deprogrammer to work with Branch Davidian members prior to the 1993 siege at Waco. The CBS television network hired Ross as an on-scene analyst for their coverage of the Waco siege and he was consulted by the Federal Bureau of Investigation as well.

Criticism of government agencies' involvement with Ross has come from Nancy Ammerman, a professor of sociology of religion, who cited FBI interview notes which stated Ross "has a personal hatred for all religious cults". She further stated the Bureau of Alcohol, Tobacco, and Firearms and FBI did rely on Ross when he recommended that agents "attempt to publicly humiliate Koresh, hoping to drive a wedge between him and his followers". Other scholars of religion also criticized Ross' involvement.

=== Jason Scott deprogramming ===
Ross faced unlawful imprisonment charges over a 1991 forcible deprogramming of United Pentecostal Church International member Jason Scott, whose mother was referred to Ross by the CAN. Ross was acquitted of these charges by the jury at trial.

Scott later filed a civil suit against Ross, two of his associates and CAN in federal court. In September 1995, a nine-member jury unanimously held the defendants liable for conspiracy to deprive Scott of his civil rights and religious liberties. In addition, the jury held that Ross and his associates (but not CAN) "intentionally or recklessly acted in a way so outrageous in character and so extreme in degree as to go beyond all possible bounds of decency and to be regarded as atrocious and utterly intolerable in a civilized community." The case resulted in an award of $875,000 in compensatory damages and punitive damages in the amount of $5 million against Ross, $1M against CAN, and $250,000 against each of Ross's two other co-defendants. The case bankrupted the CAN, and a coalition of groups that were attacked by the CAN bought its assets, and ran a new version of the CAN which become active in religious freedom causes. According to Eugene Gallagher, the Scott case marked a watershed for non-traditional religions in North America.

Scott later reconciled with his mother, who had originally hired Ross to deprogram him. Scott terminated his lawyer, Kendrick Moxon, a prominent Scientologist attorney, and was persuaded by his mother to settle with Ross. Under the terms of the settlement, the two agreed that Ross would pay Scott $5,000 and provide 200 hours of his professional services. The settlement between Scott and Ross was leaked to the Washington Post, which reportedly angered Scott. Graham Berry, his new attorney, said that "it would be a mistake to assume that Scott's decision to make use of Ross' time was a vindication of Ross or his deprogramming methods", and refused to say what services Ross would supply under the agreement. According to the book American Countercultures, Ross and others forwarded the notion that charismatic leaders were able to brainwash college-aged youths, and that such cases were in need of forcible removal from the cult environment and deprogramming. In a book that Ross self-published in 2014, he wrote that after the Scott case he stopped involuntary deprogramming work with adults, advising against such interventions with adults because of the risk of legal consequences.

== Other activities ==
Ross started a website with his archives in 1996. Launched under the name "Rick A. Ross Institute for the Study of Destructive Cults, Controversial Groups, and Movements", and later renamed "Cult Education Institute", it displayed material on controversial groups and movements and their leaders, including Charles Manson, Jim Jones, David Koresh, as well as the Westboro Baptist Church on which Ross had been collecting data since 1993. Content from the website and Ross' opinion surrounding it has been cited in books such as Andrew Breitbart and Mark Ebner's Hollywood, Interrupted in which Ross is quoted as forwarding the notion that Hollywood and the entertainment industry are rife with connections to controversial groups, and that celebrities as role models may influence people by their endorsement of such groups. According to Ann E. Robertson, the Institute "is an unusual source of considerable information about rather obscure groups".

By 2004, Ross had handled more than 350 deprogramming cases in various countries and testified as an expert witness in several court cases. He has also contributed to a number of books, including a foreword to Tim Madigan's See No Evil and a chapter to Roman Espejo's Cults: Opposing Viewpoints.

In 2004, after Ross obtained copies of NXIVM's training manuals from a former participant who had signed a nondisclosure agreement with NXIVM, Ross posted some content from the manuals along with his critiques on his website. For publishing parts of their manuals, NXIVM sued Ross's Cult Education Institute for copyright infringement. In NXIVM Corp. v. Ross Institute, the use of the material for critique was ruled transformative and therefore fair use. In 2019, Ross testified in the racketeering, sex trafficking, forced labor and conspiracy trial of NXIVM's leader Keith Raniere as a cult expert who had spent years dealing with NXIVM, where Ross stated that NXIVM's teachings were not self-help but rather a cult of personality.

In June 2004, Landmark Education filed a 1 million dollar lawsuit against the institute, alleging that postings on its websites which characterized Landmark as a cultish organization that brainwashed their clients damaged Landmark's product. Landmark filed to dismiss its own lawsuit with prejudice, in December 2005, purportedly on the grounds of a material change in case law after the publication of an opinion in another case, Donato v. Moldow, regarding the Communications Decency Act of 1996, even though Ross wanted to continue the case in order to further investigate Landmark's materials and their history of suing critics. Ross stated that he does not see Landmark as a cult because they have no individual leader, but he considers them harmful because subjects are harassed and intimidated, causing potentially unsafe levels of stress.

The Cult Education Institute has its own YouTube channel, since January 2015, with over 70 videos and 25,000 subscribers as of 2023. Ross was part of the creative team at Ubisoft for the 2018 video game Far Cry 5, involving a fictional doomsday cult. Ross has been interviewed for various documentaries on cults and other allegedly exploitative organizations, including: The Vow, season 1, episode 6, "Honesty & Disclosure" (2020, HBO), about Catherine Oxenberg and the NXIVM cult; Seduced: Inside the NXIVM Cult (2020, Starz), about the same; The Rise and Fall of LuLaRoe (2021, Discovery+), which examined a controversial multi-level marketing company; and a 2021 video piece for the YouTube channel of American magazine Vanity Fair, on cults in films and television.

In 2013, the organization was renamed from Rick A. Ross Institute to Cult Education Institute, and the domain name rickross.com was retired.
