= Galen Kelly =

American deprogrammer (born 1947)

Galen G. Kelly (born 13 January 1947 – 3 August 2025) was a deprogrammer, associated with the Cult Awareness Network. He served as CAN's "security advisor." Prior to this he was a director for the Citizens' Freedom Foundation, a precursor to the CAN. Kelly was raised in Accord, New York.

== Deprogramming and anti-cult litigation issues ==
According to a 1977 court case, Merylee Kreshour, a member of ISKCON, was subjected to a deprogramming by Kelly and her mother Edith Kreshour on 7 September 1976. On 8 September 1976, a Grand Jury voted not to indict either of them, but told the District Attorney to continue investigating potential criminal actions.

In 1980, Kelly along with three other people – Elizabeth Kelly (Galen's wife), Eric Shufelt, and Paul Stuart-Kregor – were arrested by New York State Police after Kevin Vallee (also spelt "Valle" or "Valee") escaped their false imprisonment in an attempt to deprogram him from the Unification Church. The charges were eventually dismissed in late 1980.

In May 1982, Kelly was sued for 9 million USD in damages from Unificationist Anthony Colombrito. Colombrito alleged that Kelly kidnapped him and brought him to an isolated farm in New York for eighteen hours in 1979 in order to deprogram him. Colombrito's mother obtained a temporary court order in New Jersey that granted her custody of her adult son, and she hired Kelly to deprogram Colombrito. Kelly and his attorney, Robert Iseman, sought the testimony of Reverend Sun Myung Moon in the case in order to demonstrate that the Unification Church was a fraudulent organization, which they received with protest from Sun Myung Moon's attorney, Charles A. Stillman. Colombrito got approval from the Second Circuit Court of Appeals to drop the case on 28 May 1977.

In 1983, Kelly drafted up a report to the founder of the Citizens' Freedom Foundation, Priscilla Coates, in order to investigate and eradicate a new religious movement called the Island Pond Community Church (formally the Northeast Kingdom Community Church), located in Island Pond, Vermont. The Vermont community would eventually be raided by Vermont State Police in June 1984 that alleged child abuse in the community.

In 1992, Kelly was indicted for allegedly planning to kidnap du Pont heir and Lyndon LaRouche follower Lewis du Pont Smith. The trial ended with acquittal.

In 1993, Kelly was convicted to a seven-year three-month sentence in federal prison for the 1992 kidnapping of Debra Dobkowski, the head of the Washington DC group called The Circle of Friends. Kelly had mistaken the victim for her roommate Beth Bruckert, who had been the intended target. During the trial it was also established that the Cult Awareness Network, contrary to its publicly stated policy, in which it dissociated itself from deprogramming, had for many months during the 1990s paid Kelly a monthly stipend for preparing a pamphlet on Lyndon LaRouche.

Kelly's conviction was overturned in 1994 by the appeals court because of prosecutorial misconduct: Assistant U.S. Attorney Larry Leiser had failed to turn over a search warrant affidavit that contained impeachment material and an impeaching memo written by the kidnap victim Dobkowski. Subsequent investigations by the Department of Justice, the Virginia State Bar and the D.C. Bar vindicated Leiser of those allegations finding that the affidavit was in the public record and available to defense counsel prior to Dobkowski testifying, and that the impeaching memo was not discovered until weeks after the trial had concluded. Dobkowski had claimed that she wasn't a member of the group, while Kelly had claimed that Dobkowski set him up by switching beds with her roommate, changing her hair and entering the van voluntarily and later claiming to have been kidnapped. Dobkowski later pleaded guilty for money laundering crimes and served a 21-month prison sentence.

== Other activities ==
In 1988, Kelly investigated the "kidnapping" of Tawana Brawley and dug up evidence that she had been at parties within the four days of her disappearance.
