= Frederick Lenz =

American spiritual leader (1950-1998)

Frederick Philip Lenz
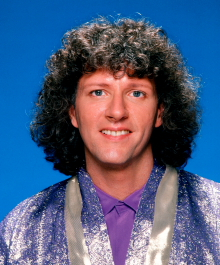
- Born: February 9, 1950; San Diego, California, U.S.
- Died: April 12, 1998 (aged 48); Old Field, New York, U.S.
- Other names: Rama (Sanskrit: राम), Atmananda (Sanskrit: आतमाननद)
- Education: Doctor of Philosophy, Master of Arts
- Alma mater: University of Connecticut, State University of New York at Stony Brook
- Occupations: Buddhist teacher, author, software designer, businessman
- Website: www.fredericklenz.com

Frederick Philip Lenz III, also known as Rama (Sanskrit: राम), Zen Master Rama and Atmananda (Sanskrit: आतमाननद; February 9, 1950 – April 12, 1998) was an American spiritual leader, writer, software designer, and record producer. He founded what he termed "American Buddhism", which incorporated the teachings of Tibetan Buddhism, Zen, Vedanta, mysticism, and New Age ideas.

After studying with Sri Chinmoy, who gave him the name 'Atmananda', Lenz lectured and taught classes in meditation, before forming his own school and assuming the name 'Rama'. His teachings centered around enlightenment in the modern world through the integration of Eastern religious principles into everyday life. He wrote several books on meditation and Buddhist philosophy, including two novels depicting a young American snowboarder's encounter with a Tibetan Buddhist Master in the Himalayas, which were, according to Lenz, loosely based on his own experiences in Nepal.

Though a Buddhist, Lenz eschewed asceticism, lived a lavish lifestyle, and encouraged students to focus on financial independence and success. Some former students accused him of cult-like activity, including financial and sexual exploitation. Lenz denied the accusations; no civil or criminal proceedings were ever brought against him.

Lenz died in an apparent suicide in 1998. After his death, his $23 million estate became the subject of dispute, ultimately leading to the creation of the Frederick P. Lenz Foundation for American Buddhism, which has made significant grants to various American Buddhist organizations since 2003.

== Biography ==
=== Childhood and adolescence ===
Frederick Lenz was born in San Diego, California, to Frederick Lenz Jr., a marketing executive, and Dorothy Gumaer Lenz, a housewife and student of astrology. Lenz stated that he had his first experience of samadhi, a state of spiritual absorption, in his mother's garden when he was still a toddler. Lenz's family moved to Stamford, Connecticut, when he was three years old. Lenz grew up and attended school in Stamford. His father served as the town's mayor from 1973 to 1975.

While in high school, he practiced Korean martial arts where he was introduced to meditation. After high school, Lenz was incarcerated in a minimum security camp near San Diego for possession of marijuana, a misdemeanor offense which was later removed from the court records by way of a dismissal. According to his own account, he then traveled to Kathmandu and encountered a Tibetan Buddhist monk who informed him that in the future, he would help millions of people and carry on the teachings of a lineage that had almost disappeared.

=== Education ===
Lenz graduated from Rippowam High School in 1967. He later attended the University of Connecticut, where he majored in English and minored in Philosophy. He was inducted as a member of the Phi Beta Kappa honor society in 1973 and graduated magna cum laude.

After college, Lenz won a competitive State of New York Graduate Council Fellowship enabling him to continue his studies. He earned a Master of Arts and a Doctor of Philosophy from State University of New York at Stony Brook, finishing his studies in 1979. His doctoral dissertation was on "The Evolution of Matter and Spirit in the Poetry of Theodore Roethke". While completing his graduate degrees, Lenz worked as a lecturer in English at the New School for Social Research.

== Spiritual teachings ==
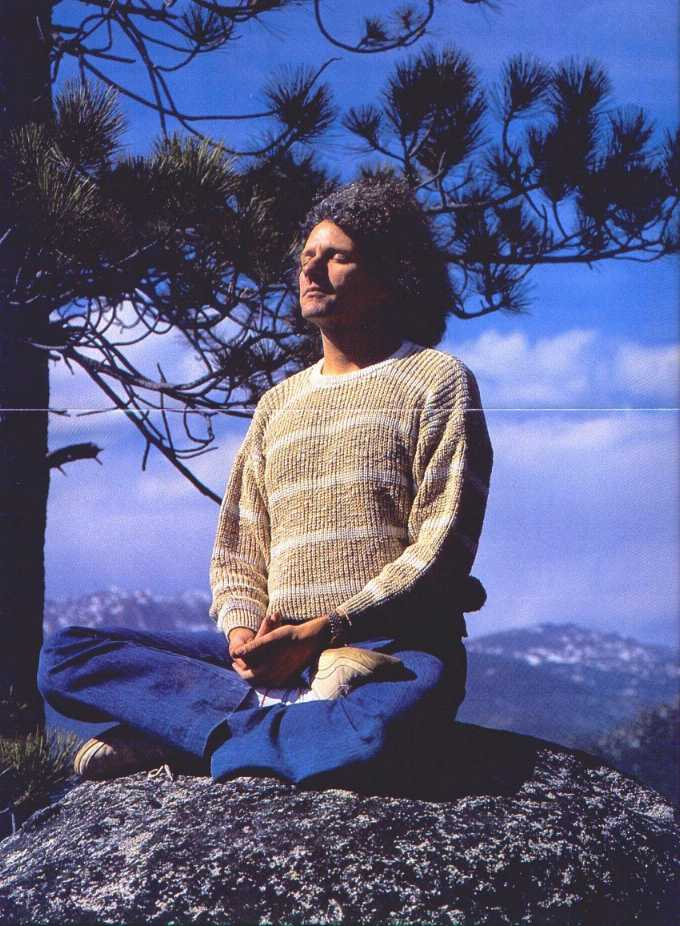
Frederick Lenz at Lake Tahoe, CA

When he was 18 years old, Lenz began studying yoga under Sri Chinmoy. Chinmoy later gave him the name "Atmananda", a name meaning "bliss of the soul". As Atmananda, Lenz began teaching yoga classes in New York. After finishing his doctorate in 1979 he moved back to San Diego where he gave lectures and taught meditation. He became a popular figure in Chinmoy's organization, attracting thousands to the auditoriums where he lectured and reputedly performed miracles. Lenz ended his association with Chinmoy in 1981 after founding his own teaching center in Los Angeles, initially named Lakshmi, after the Hindu Goddess of prosperity and beauty.

At the end of 1982, Lenz adopted the teaching name of "Rama". He indicated that the name was not intended to affirm identity with the Rama of the Hindu epic The Ramayana, but rather some of the qualities associated with him. According to students' accounts, Lenz said that he was an incarnation of Vishnu, but also insisted this did not mean he was any more important than anyone else, and that it was essential they understood this.

Lenz said that he remembered all his previous incarnations, including his life as a high priest in Atlantis, and four lives as teachers in India, Japan, and Tibet during the 16th through early 20th centuries. His first book, published in 1979, was on the subject of reincarnation.

By 1985, Lenz had approximately 800 full-time disciples in four main locations – Los Angeles, San Diego, San Francisco and Boston. He reincorporated his organization under the name of 'Rama Seminars', characterizing his spiritual teaching as 'Tantric Zen', which incorporated aspects of Chan, Vajrayana Buddhism, Taoism, and Jnana yoga.

Students, and even some non-students and sceptics, wrote that Lenz demonstrated apparently supernatural powers (siddhi), including levitation, teleportation, disappearing, emanating a golden light that filled the room, projecting light from his hands, and transforming into an old, bearded Asian man before their eyes. He often took his students on field trips to the deserts of Southern California and to Disneyland where a number of these events were supposedly witnessed.

Lenz spoke of the world as being full of demons, which he described as "entities" and "negative spiritual forces" that were capable of attacking people. He said that such forces operated in the subtle planes, and that ordinary people, including his students, often unconsciously engaged in such attacks on each other.

According to Zoe Nicholson, the central principle of Rama's teaching is Self Discovery: "The principle is simple; that inside of each woman and man is the Self, Nirvana, Eternity. It has been covered with layers of conditioning, lifetimes of tendencies and fear of the unknown. Through the practice of Self Discovery all these layers are peeled back eventually revealing one's true nature: perfect pure light."

Lenz conducted spiritual classes, seminars and public meditations for 27 years. Although students completed college-style applications, he accepted students based on "his intuition and his sense of what each student needs".

The core of study was always meditation. Lenz described the experience of ecstasy in meditation thus:

You concentrate so intensely, you bring your will to such a singular point that you break through all the limited mind states. You bring in so much kundalini because your focus is so intense that you snap out of the limited mental states into higher mental states, and then, of course, you experience the pure, shining void in whatever form you're capable of experiencing it as, from your sentient mind state, and that in itself is ecstasy.

Putting the practice in a wider perspective, he said:

Meditate and realize that when you meditate, no matter how high you go, no matter how deeply you perceive, that you're only touching the bare surface of infinity. Just hold in mind the fact that beyond your perception is ecstasy. Not far beyond. Just with the stoppage of thought there's ecstasy—power, understanding, in limitless amounts. And no matter how far you go, you can never experience all of it. And if you dissolve the self completely, it doesn't end."

== Novels ==
Lenz wrote two novels expounding many of the Buddhist principles that formed the basis of his teaching – Surfing the Himalayas (1995) and Snowboarding to Nirvana (1997). In an introductory note to Surfing the Himalayas Lenz writes that the novels are "based on a series of experiences that occurred to me some time ago in Nepal. I have taken the liberty of transforming them into a work of fiction." The novels focus on a student-master relationship that develops between an American snowboarder and a Buddhist monk – "Master Fwap".

Lenz spent approximately $1.5 million to promote Surfing the Himalayas, taking out full-page ads in The New York Times and Rolling Stone, and placing ads on billboards. It was originally going to be published by Warner Books, but they reneged following a negative campaign by Lenz's critics, citing "marketing differences with the author". The book was then picked up by St. Martin's Press, who ran advertisements in 1700 cinemas across the United States. Following a request by the publisher, Chicago Bulls coach and student of Zen Phil Jackson endorsed the book, calling it "benign and appropriate" and describing it as bringing "levity and humour to a subject often relegated to a mundane, boring prospect". Jackson later withdrew the endorsement after being inundated with negative correspondence about Lenz.

Surfing the Himalayas was a success, selling over 100,000 hardcover copies in its first two months. The singer Tina Turner said in 2018 that she kept a copy of Surfing the Himalayas in her prayer room.

== Software designer ==
Lenz encouraged his students to pursue computer science because of the mental challenge, diverse career opportunities and high rates of pay. Many students became skilled programmers and went on to form their own software companies, with Lenz acting as co-designer and advisor. These companies included AutoSys (sold to Platinum Technology in 1995), CS10000, Vantage Point (VP-Med and SmartCare), Vayu Web, and Eagle Ray Project Management Software (sold to Primavera).

Devotees described Lenz as an enlightened master whose seminars helped them to become wealthy, but some of those who dropped out claimed that he advised his students to inflate their credentials and to use friends under pseudonyms as references to get jobs. Lenz said that he never told his students to lie and that the allegation was false.

== Music career ==
Lenz was the producer for the rock band Zazen, which produced 31 albums in 13 years. The group also released several music videos. Lenz was also co-composer of the album Ecologie (credited under "Rama") and the soundtrack for 704 Hauser.

== Controversies ==
Some former followers and parents of followers made accusations in the media of psychological abuse, financial exploitation, and sexual exploitation of female members of the group. A group was formed, calling itself Lenz-Watch, that actively sought to publicize these claims wherever Lenz or his students operated. In interviews, Lenz always strenuously denied allegations of sexual or financial exploitation. No legal action, in either a civil or criminal court, was ever taken against him relating to any form of sexual or financial abuse.

=== Allegations and responses ===
Lenz lived a lavish lifestyle, which included owning mansions, expensive cars, and using a private jet. He rejected asceticism adopted by some other Buddhists, describing it as a "begging bowl" mentality. Initial courses were free or low cost, but later courses could be expensive, with a 5-day course costing $2,000. Members of the group were expected to pay a monthly tuition with some paying up to $3,000 a month. Claims of exploitation were made by some former students. Other students said that they voluntarily gave Lenz money and gifts in gratitude for his teaching, which helped them to lead a better life and led them to successful careers in computer programming.

Lenz was the subject of several sexual abuse allegations. According to two former female members, Lenz claimed that having sex with him would increase their chances of enlightenment and a more auspicious reincarnation, as well as transfer his "energy" into them. Lenz maintained that although he had sexual relations with some students, it was always on the basis of informed consent. He described such relations as "perfectly acceptable", and in line with the teachings of Tantric Buddhism. He compared it to meeting someone at church and going out with them: "I think it's called being a healthy American male."

In his teaching, Lenz discouraged male students from making sexual advances towards female students, telling them that a man working toward spiritual liberation can help women by "not projecting sexual energy toward them". He advised women seeking enlightenment that, since for most men sexuality is conflated with violence, it is better to detach themselves from men until they are stronger.

One former follower accused Lenz of giving them anti-psychotic drugs after they had attempted to leave the group, while some said he gave them LSD. Other students said that allegations of drug abuse were unfounded and that Lenz repeatedly warned students about the dangers of taking drugs.

Lenz was accused of being responsible for the suicide of one of his followers and the mental breakdown of two others. He denied having a personal relationship with these students and said that, while he grieved for anyone who would take their own life, he could not be held personally responsible.

=== Cult Awareness Network and Lenz-Watch ===
Lenz received criticism from the sect-monitoring movement. Some former students and parents of students became involved with sect watchdog groups, including the CAN (Cult Awareness Network). Lenz was accused of controlling his followers activities, including pressuring them to move and encouraging them to cut off contact with their friends and families. Other students said they lived normal lives, were in contact with their families, and had great admiration for their teacher. Several disgruntled parents formed a group, Lenz-Watch, that "kept tabs" on Lenz because they considered him a "danger to society". The group focused on placing negative media about Frederick Lenz wherever he lived or taught, or wherever his students taught.

Some parents from Lenz-Watch paid kidnappers to "deprogram" their adult children. According to one of the abductees, Jennifer Jacobs, the kidnapping involved being held captive in a roadhouse, where she was repeatedly subjected to physical, verbal and emotional abuse. In a legal declaration, Jacobs stated that the abuse only stopped after 11 days, when she pretended to be 'cured', though she was nevertheless forcibly detained for several more weeks. According to Jacobs, the kidnappers told her that her parents had instigated the kidnapping on the advice of the Cult Awareness Network.

Deprogrammers were also hired by the parents of Karen Lever, a 33-year-old President of a computer consulting company, who had attended some of Lenz's seminars. As she was loading luggage into her car at SeaTac airport near Seattle, Lever was seized and shoved into a van by three men: "one man sat on me and clamped his hand over my mouth to prevent me from screaming... I could hardly breathe." She was held captive for eight days in a small room in her parents' house, guarded 24 hours a day by at least seven "deprogrammers", and subjected to a barrage of arguments against Lenz and his "cult", including being repeatedly forced to watch videos about the Manson Family. The deprogrammers eventually returned her to her car at SeaTac airport. She called the police and was told she had grounds to press charges for kidnapping and false imprisonment. In both cases the parents' efforts to "deprogram" their children failed: both Lever and Jacobs remained supportive of Lenz and his teaching.

Some of Lenz's students alleged that anti-cult groups were circulating their names to recruiters in order to prevent them advancing their careers.

== Death and his estate ==
Lenz drowned in Conscience Bay, near his home in Old Field, New York on April 12, 1998, the victim of an apparent suicide. Lenz had reportedly taken 150 valium tablets before drowning. He stated that his death was a protest against how spiritual teachers are treated in America. He had reportedly been depressed following eye surgery, but it was thought by many that it was grief over the death of his beloved dog, Vayu, that ultimately pushed him over the edge. Former students have said that Lenz believed that his followers wanted him dead. Reporting following his death suggested that his suicide was part of a suicide pact with a female student, who also ingested drugs, but survived the incident.

He left a gross estate of approximately $23 million. His will was a matter of dispute between the National Audubon Society and his estate, which was settled by a donation to the National Audubon Society, and the creation of the Frederick P. Lenz Foundation for American Buddhism, which at the time was headed by Lenz's accountant, Norman Marcus (executor of his will) and Norman Oberstein, his attorney. This act fulfilled provisions of the will necessary to apply the funds from Lenz's estate to the creation of the Lenz Foundation. His estate was settled in 2002. Since 2003, The Frederick P. Lenz Foundation for American Buddhism has engaged in substantial grant making activity (over $8.5 million to date) to approximately 200 American Buddhist organizations. As part of the settlement with Audubon, a gorge was named for Lenz at the Sharon Audubon Center in northwest Connecticut.

== Publications ==
=== Bibliography ===
- Lifetimes: True Accounts of Reincarnation, 1979, Fawcett Crest, New York ISBN 0-449-24337-0
- Total Relaxation: The Complete Program for Overcoming Stress, Tension, Worry, and Fatigue, 1980, The Bobbs-Merrill Company, Indianapolis ISBN 0-672-52594-1
- Meditation: The Bridge is Flowing but The River is Not, 1981, Lakshmi Publications, Malibu, CA, Revised 1983 ISBN 0-941868-00-1
- The Wheel of Dharma, 1982, Lakshmi Publications, Malibu, CA ISBN 0-941868-01-X
- The Last Incarnation, 1983, Lakshmi Publications, Malibu, CA ISBN 0-941868-02-8
- Insights: Tantric Buddhist Reflections on Life, 1994, Interglobal Seminars, New York ISBN 0-9642196-7-0
- Surfing the Himalayas, 1995, St. Martin's Press, New York ISBN 0-312-14147-5
- Snowboarding to Nirvana, 1997, St. Martin's Press, New York ISBN 0-312-15293-0
- The Ethical Creation and Marketing of Software, Frederick Lenz, Mystic Buddha, 1992,2023 ASIN B0CB9JJ9CZ
- The Lakshmi Series, 2016, Mystic Buddha Publishing House, ISBN 0997243120
- Insights: Talks on the Nature of Existence, 2021, Living Flow, Boulder, CO ISBN 1947811290
- Zen Tapes, 2020, Living Flow, Boulder, CO, ISBN 9781947811249
- Tantric Buddhism, 2020, Living Flow, Boulder, CO ISBN 978-1-947811-21-8
- The Enlightenment Cycle, 2020, Living Flow, Boulder, CO ISBN 9781947811171
- Rama Live! Talks and Workshops, 2023, Living Flow. ISBN 978-1947811416
- Surfing the Himalayas: Abridged, 2024, Living Flow, ASIN B0DM6Y2J4T

=== Films and video recordings ===
- Tantric Buddhism with Rama 1993 ASIN B002VAMPA0
- Canyons of Light & Cayman Blue 2011 ASIN B006FBYL
- Signs of a Rebel Buddha (starring)
