= New Cult Awareness Network =

American organization founded in 1996

CAN, the NEW Cult Awareness Network
- Formation: In 1996, the Church of Scientology purchased assets from Cult Awareness Network - "Old CAN" in United States bankruptcy court 1997, incorporated as Foundation for Religious Freedom DBA Cult Awareness Network
- Type: Advocacy, Freedom of religion, Hotline
- Headquarters: 3500 West Olive Avenue, Suite 300, Burbank, California 91505
- Official language: English
- Chairman of the Board: George Robertson
- Key people: Stan Koehler, Secretary; Nancy O'Meara, Treasurer

The "New Cult Awareness Network" (NCAN, often referred to as simply the "Cult Awareness Network", though unrelated to the older group of that name) is an organization that provides information about cults, and is owned and operated by associates of the Church of Scientology, itself categorized in many countries as a cult. It was formed in 1996, with the name purchased from the now defunct Cult Awareness Network, an organization that provided information on groups it considered to be cults, and that strongly opposed Scientology.

The "New CAN" organization (also known as the Foundation for Religious Freedom) has caused both confusion and controversy among academics and its opponents. Board members of the "Old CAN" have characterized it as a front group for the Church of Scientology. In December 1997, 60 Minutes profiled the controversy regarding the history of the "Old CAN" and the "New CAN", with host Lesley Stahl noting, "Now, when you call looking for information about a cult, chances are the person you're talking to is a Scientologist". Margaret Thaler Singer expressed the opinion that any experts the public would be referred to by the "New CAN" would be cult apologists. Shupe and Darnell noted the "New CAN" had been able to attract support from donors such as Amazon.com, and by 2000 it was receiving thousands of phone calls per month. The "New CAN" promotes itself as a champion of human rights and freedom of religion. An August 2007 article on Fox News on the Wikipedia Scanner noted "a computer linked to the Church of Scientology's network was used to delete references to links between it and [...] the 'Cult Awareness Network'" on Wikipedia.

== History ==
=== Bought in bankruptcy court ===
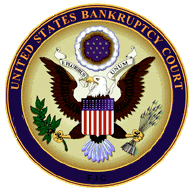
Seal of the United States bankruptcy court. Church of Scientology attorney Steven Hayes bought rights to the Cult Awareness Network assets during its bankruptcy proceedings.

The old Cult Awareness Network, which publicly opposed Scientology as well as other groups it considered to be cults, was driven into bankruptcy by litigation costs in 1996. Subsequently, Church of Scientology attorney Steven Hayes appeared in bankruptcy court and won the bidding for what remained of the organization for an amount of $20,000: the name, logo, phone number, office equipment, and judgments that the organization had won but not yet collected. Initially, the Scientologists did not gain access to the CAN files, because of the threat of litigation against the bankruptcy trustee; the files were returned to the board. After Jason Scott sold his $1.875 million judgment to Scientologist Gary Beeny for $25,000, this made Beeny, represented by Scientology attorney Kendrick Moxon, CAN's largest creditor. The CAN board then settled with Beeny by turning over the files to him instead of the possibility of being individually liable for the judgement.

Individuals who had confided in the "Old CAN" organization expressed anxiety about their confidential files being sold to other groups, but Moxon stated: "People who have committed crimes don't want them to be revealed". According to Shupe, Darnell and Moxon, there is evidence that a number of documents in the files were destroyed by unknown persons at CAN in the early to mid-nineties, during the time when CAN and its directors were embroiled in legal battles. Moxon sought out pledges of money from leaders of new religious movements for the confidential files. Moxon believed only 5 percent of the files related to Scientology, and told The Washington Post he had contacted leaders of other new religious movements because he thought that "there's smoking guns in the files" involving deprogrammers and the "Old CAN". After being turned over to Beeny, the files were donated to the Foundation for Religious Freedom, who made them available to academic researchers and representatives of various new religious movements for inspection and photocopying. Later they were transferred to the Special Collections section of the University of California library in Santa Barbara.

In 1997, the Foundation for Religious Freedom became the license holder of the CAN name. The foundation was chaired by George Robertson, a Greater Grace World Outreach minister. It operated a website and a telephone hotline. The Foundation for Religious Freedom predates the "New CAN"; in the 1993 closing agreement between the IRS and the Church of Scientology, it was listed as a Scientology-related entity.

== Reception ==
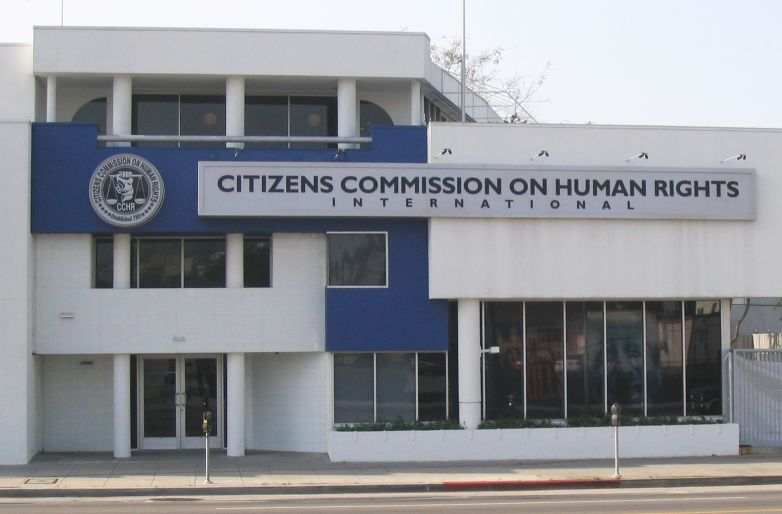
An article published by the "New" Cult Awareness Network in 2000 on the group Aum Shinrikyo thanked the Citizen's Commission on Human Rights for their research on psychiatry.

In her book Researching New Religious Movements, Arweck wrote that individuals began to fear that Scientology would "use CAN's name to cause confusion", and these fears solidified with the appearance of "New CAN". Board members of the "Old CAN" said the "New CAN" was nothing but a front group for Scientology. A section of its website relating to the Aum Supreme Truth sect authored by Nick Broadhurst, a New Zealand Scientology spokesman, stated that the real source of the crimes committed by Aum were drugs and psychiatric treatments the cult administered to its members. Broadhurst thanked the Scientology subsidiary Citizen's Commission on Human Rights for usage of material in his report. Scientology is extremely hostile towards psychiatry. The site does not contain any criticism of Scientology, unlike most other sites which claim to provide anti-cult information (other than those dedicated to other specific groups). In the Scientology publication IMPACT, Nr. 72, Scientologist and CAN VP Jean Hornnes explained, "We have successfully prevented deprogrammings and we have taken broken families and helped to put them back together by using standard LRH technology on handling PTSness". In January 1997, shortly after the formation of the New CAN, brochures mailed out by the organization described Scientology as a way to "increase happiness and improve conditions for oneself and for others".

Other news sources reported that the (New) Cult Awareness Network was owned by the Church of Scientology. A December 1996 report by CNN had the headline: "Group that once criticized Scientologists now owned by one." One Scientologist was quoted in the report as stating that he believed the New Cult Awareness Network would stand for "religious freedom", however former director Cynthia Kisser was quoted as saying, "People are going to believe they're going to talk to an organization that's going to help and understand them in their time of crisis, and in fact, it could be a pipeline of information directly to the group they're most afraid of". In 1997, an article in the New York Times characterized the New CAN as an affiliate of the Church of Scientology, stating: "now it's in the hands of a Scientologist and proselytizes for the church". The New CAN has been accused of giving away the identity of a caller, a concerned mother, to the cult she was inquiring about, which resulted in further damaging the relationship with her daughter. Penn writes in False Dawn that the New Cult Awareness Network is "dominated by Scientologists". In describing what he refers to as the "doublespeak" of the (New) Cult Awareness Network, Tuman states that Scientology and CAN utilize the term "religious freedom" as a hallmark of its defense against critics. Tuman wrote that: "What seems to be the case is that the Cult Awareness Network has kept its same name and even its original mission statement, while shifting its concern 180 degrees, from investigating sects to protecting them (from "religious intolerance"). Tuman concluded his piece entitled: "The Strange Case of the Cult Awareness Network", by comparing the Web site of the (New) Cult Awareness Network to the 1956 cult film, The Invasion of the Body Snatchers.

On December 12, 1996, a usenet posting by "lah" (later reported by TIME magazine to be the account of one Sister Francis Michael of the Heaven's Gate group) in the newsgroup alt.religion.scientology applauded Scientology for their "courageous action against the Cult Awareness Network", which she accused of "promoting all sort of lies (including) cult activities." This email was also reported on, and the full-text of the email was displayed, in an article called "The business of cults", in 2000. The subject of the email, "Thanks for Actions Against CAN", and contained the text, "Here's a round of applause to the Church of Scientology for their courageous action against the Cult Awareness Network."

In December 1997, 60 Minutes profiled the new management of the Cult Awareness Network, in a piece hosted by Lesley Stahl, entitled: "CAN: The Cult Awareness Network". 60 Minutes referred to the (Old) Cult Awareness Network as a comprehensive resource, stating it was "for 20 years the nation's best-known resource for information and advice about groups it considered dangerous." The current influence by the Church of Scientology was investigated, and Stahl commented in a voice-over: "Now, when you call looking for information about a cult, chances are the person you're talking to is a Scientologist." The Church of Scientology's fair game policy was described by Stahl; examples of the Fair Game policy were given on-camera from people including Stacy Brooks, as well as a private investigator hired by Kendrick Moxon. Moxon and Church president Heber Jentzsch also gave an interview, during which Jentzsch compared CAN to the Ku Klux Klan and the Nazi Party. The Time Magazine article "The Thriving Cult of Greed and Power" was also cited as a reference in the report. The piece concluded by displaying some of the pamphlets distributed by the (New) Cult Awareness Network, which included one called "Facts about Deprogramming" and another entitled "Fact vs. Fiction: Scientology: the inside story at last". In August 2007, a Fox News Channel article on the new Wikipedia Scanner reported that "a computer linked to the Church of Scientology's network was used to delete references to links between it and [...] the 'Cult Awareness Network'."

== See also ==
- Church of Scientology
- Alt.religion.scientology
- Scientology and the legal system
- Scientology controversies
