= Kendrick Moxon =

American Scientology official

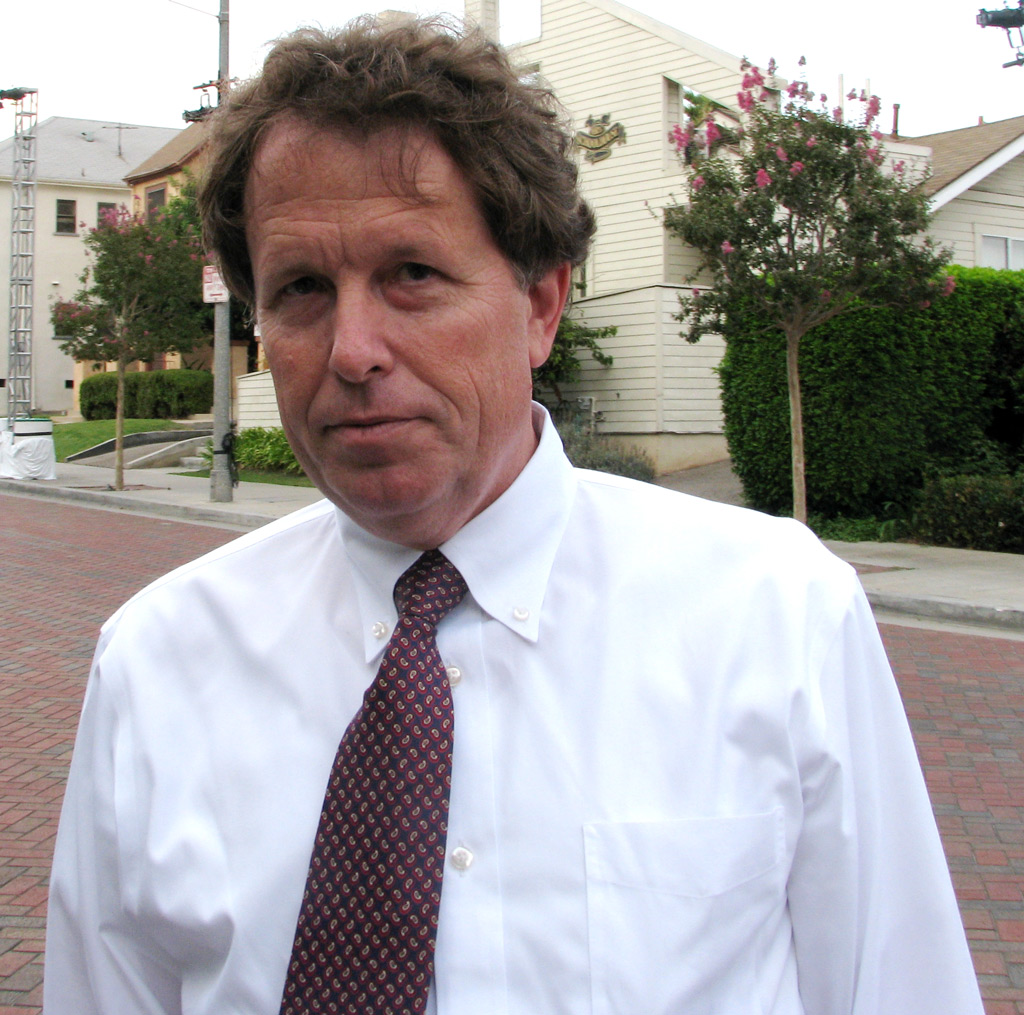
- Moxon outside Church of Scientology Los Angeles in 2008
- Born: Pennsylvania, United States
- Occupation: Attorney
- Employer: Partner at Moxon & Kobrin
- Organization: Church of Scientology
- Known for: Attorney for Church of Scientology
- Website: kendrickmoxon.com

Kendrick "Rick" Moxon, born Kendrick Lichty Moxon, is an American Scientology official and an attorney with the law firm Moxon & Kobrin. He practices in Los Angeles, California, and is a lead counsel for the Church of Scientology. (Note: Author Janet Reitman notes, "Scientology's attorneys were not always wholly independent. One Los Angeles-based lawyer for the church, cited as "outside counsel," was Kendrick Moxon, a Scientologist and former Guardian's Office legal officer who, like L. Ron Hubbard, was named an unindicted co-conspirator in Operation Snow White.") Moxon received his Doctor of Jurisprudence in 1981, and was admitted to the District of Columbia Bar in 1984, and the State Bar of California in 1987. Moxon's early work for the Church of Scientology involved legal affairs, and he also held the Scientology title of "reverend". He worked at Scientology's intelligence agency known as the Guardian's Office (GO), and was named as an unindicted co-conspirator after the Federal Bureau of Investigation's investigation into criminal activities by Scientology operatives which was called "Operation Snow White". An evidence stipulation in the case stated he had provided false handwriting samples to the FBI; Moxon has since said that he did not "knowingly supply" false handwriting samples.

The bulk of Moxon's legal work is Scientology-related. He has served as Commissioner of Scientology's Citizens Commission on Human Rights (CCHR). He represented the Church of Scientology in 1988 in a billion-dollar class action lawsuit against the organization by former Scientologists which was dismissed in Los Angeles Superior Court. In 1990 Moxon represented the organization in a suit against the Internal Revenue Service in an attempt to gain access to their records on Scientology. He assisted 50 Scientologists in filing separate lawsuits against the organization Cult Awareness Network (CAN), which led to the bankruptcy of the organization. He represented the plaintiff in the Jason Scott case against CAN and cult deprogrammer Rick Ross.

A Scientology publication said Moxon had used church doctrine in bringing down CAN. Its assets were bought in bankruptcy court by a Scientologist and legal associate of Moxon's. Moxon said he was proud of what he had done, referring to the old CAN organization as a "hate group". Moxon represented the manager of the Scientology facility Golden Era Productions in a filing against Keith Henson, a critic of Scientology. Moxon filed an affidavit in 2000 in the case involving the criminal prosecution of the Church of Scientology in the death of Scientologist Lisa McPherson, and defended her treatment by Scientology staffers as part of a religious practice.

== Early life and family ==
Moxon was born in Pennsylvania. He graduated from American University in 1972 with a Bachelor of Arts degree in Anthropology. He received his Doctor of Jurisprudence from George Mason University in 1981. He was admitted to the District of Columbia Bar on September 6, 1984, and the State Bar of California on June 17, 1987.

In 1979, Moxon and his wife Carla Smith had a son and daughter who both went to Delphi Academy. Daughter Stacy Grove Meyer had worked for two years at Golden Era Productions in landscaping and maintenance, when she died of electrocution on June 25, 2000, after touching a 7,200-volt wire in an underground electrical transformer vault on the premises. Golden Era Productions was cited by the California Division of Occupational Safety and Health for improper wiring precautions near a vault where Meyer had been working, but their investigation of the death determined that Stacy's death was not related to the safety violations at the facility.

== Guardian's Office ==
In 1977, Moxon served as an official of the Church of Scientology, and held the title of "reverend". His role within the organization in 1977 was called "Director of the Ministry of Legal Affairs of the Founding Church of Scientology". Along with Scientology founder L. Ron Hubbard and nineteen other Scientologists, Moxon was named as an unindicted co-conspirator after the Federal Bureau of Investigation's investigation into criminal activities by Scientology operatives called "Operation Snow White". At the time of the indictments and investigation by the Federal Bureau of Investigation in the Operation Snow White case, Moxon was working in the church intelligence agency then known as the Guardian's Office (GO). Operation Snow White was the name coined by Scientology founder L. Ron Hubbard for a mission by the organization's intelligence division to illegally obtain documents from the United States government. As part of Operation Snow White, members of the Guardian's Office broke into U.S. government offices including those of the Internal Revenue Service, in order to steal documents relating to Scientology.

A 1979 stipulation of evidence signed by officials for Scientology states that Moxon provided false handwriting samples of GO operative Michael Meisner to the FBI. Both parties to the case were in agreement that Moxon responded to an October 14, 1976 subpoena titled "Grand Jury subpoena for all original known handwriting exemplars of Michael Meisner and the employment application and personnel records of Mr. Meisner in the possession of the Church of Scientology" by providing "fake handwriting samples in lieu of Mr. Meisner's true handwriting exemplars" to the United States government. The stipulation stated Moxon was "directed to supply the government with fake handwriting samples". Nine Scientologists signed the stipulation as part of a plea bargain. According to a 1976 letter from the "District of Columbia Security Office" of the Guardian's Office, "Rick Moxon" and four other individuals had either "full data or almost all of it", about covert operations against the United States government. According to the Guardian's Office letter, Moxon was prevented under penalty of a $50,000 fine from disclosing his knowledge of the church cover operations. The non-disclosure agreement was titled "Covenant of Non-Disclosure; 'Doomsday Agreement'". The letter told an official for the Church of Scientology to instruct Moxon "if they do talk, then they will be expelled forever, hounded by the GO [Guardian Office] until doomsday, and left to rot in the Physical Universe".

Moxon stated to the Phoenix New Times that the stipulation of evidence was written by FBI agents and signed by church officials. He asserted that he did not "knowingly supply" samples of false handwriting to the FBI, and said that he was investigated by the bar associations of California and Washington, D.C., before being admitted to the respective bar associations. According to the Phoenix New Times, Moxon is "in good standing" with both bar associations. Former church intelligence operative Frank Oliver told the Phoenix New Times that in his work for the replacement to the Guardian's Office, the Office of Special Affairs, his last assignment for the organization was to assist Moxon in setting up a special unit focused on the Cult Awareness Network. Oliver stated that the goal of his work with Moxon was to recruit individuals who would become plaintiffs in lawsuits against the Cult Awareness Network.

== Church of Scientology attorney ==
=== Early work ===
Moxon acted as attorney for the Church of Scientology in 1988 when former Scientologists sued the organization in a billion-dollar class action lawsuit. According to Moxon the former Scientologists included some members who were subject to excommunication, and they requested the return of donations they had made to the organization, as well as payment for time working on its behalf. The case was dismissed by a Los Angeles Superior Court judge, and Moxon characterized the plaintiffs as "a few former members who apparently banded together for the purpose of making a monetary killing".

In 1990 Moxon represented the Church of Scientology in a lawsuit against the Internal Revenue Service in an attempt to gain access to government documents on the organization. "The actions taken by the IRS in this case are typical of the agency's harassive treatment of religious groups," said Moxon in a statement in The Fresno Bee. During the Church of Scientology's battle with the IRS, Moxon's law firm hired private investigators to investigate the government agency. Private investigator Michael L. Shomers said he set up a dummy operation called "Washington News Bureau", posed as a reporter, and attempted to collect material on Scientology critics. Shomers also said he infiltrated IRS conferences in attempts to collect data on IRS employees that may have been skipping appointments, drinking or having affairs. Shomers said he was either paid in cash or by checks from Moxon's firm Bowles & Moxon. According to The New York Times, Moxon said Shomers' activities were legal, and that he and other Scientology attorneys used private investigators to counter falsehoods from "rogue government agents".

In 1993, Mario Majorski tried to sue a UCLA professor who questioned Scientology. According to court records, Moxon was one of his attorneys in the case.

=== Cult Awareness Network litigation ===
Moxon assisted Scientologists in filing 50 lawsuits against the Cult Awareness Network (CAN), which eventually led to the bankruptcy of the organization. Moxon confirmed to the St. Petersburg Times that his firm assisted the Scientologists with their litigation against CAN for mostly no charge, and that Scientology churches "helped a little bit, but very little" with the case. Moxon asserted that his legal services were requested by individual Scientologists because of his religious discrimination litigation experience. "These were filed by [individual] Scientologists who were victimized by CAN. That’s the long and short of it," said Moxon. Moxon stated to 60 Minutes "They didn't— they didn't spring up serendipitously. A number of Scientologists came to our firm and said, 'I'm being discriminated against by CAN.'"

Jason Scott of the Life Tabernacle Church in Bellevue, Washington was taken from his home in 1991 and subjected to "deprogramming". Deprogrammer Rick Ross had been referred to Scott's mother by a local volunteer for CAN, and Moxon represented Scott in a lawsuit against Ross and CAN. Moxon took on Jason Scott's case pro bono. According to a 60 Minutes report on Scientology's actions against the Cult Awareness Network, two affidavits used by Moxon in the case were false. Scott won a jury judgment of US$5 million including $1.8 million against CAN, and CAN later declared bankruptcy. After the CAN organization was purchased in bankruptcy court by a Scientology attorney, Scott fired Moxon and hired Graham Berry, a Los Angeles lawyer who had previously represented clients in suits against the Church of Scientology. Scott and Ross settled in 1996 for $5,000 and 200 hours of time from Ross for his intervention services.

Scott stated that he felt he had been manipulated as part of the Church of Scientology's plan to destroy CAN. According to the Chicago Tribune, Scott and his relatives felt Moxon was not paying enough attention to Scott's financial judgment, and was instead focused on a "personal vendetta" against CAN. "Basically, Jason said he was tired of being the poster boy for the Scientologists. My son has never been a member of the Church of Scientology. When he was approached by Moxon, he was lured by his promises of a $1 million settlement, so he went for it," said Scott's mother Katherine Tonkin in a statement to the Chicago Tribune.

After Scott fired Moxon, Moxon filed emergency motions in two states and alleged Scott had been influenced by supporters of CAN to hire Berry as his lawyer. "He's really been abused by CAN and disgustingly abused by this guy Berry," said Moxon in a statement in The Washington Post. Moxon, who had argued in the case that Ross and associates had hindered a competent adult's freedom to make his own religious decisions, immediately filed court papers seeking to rescind the settlement and appoint a guardian for Scott, whom he called "incapacitated." That effort failed. Jason Scott stated he felt he had been a "pawn" in Scientology's "whole game".

Moxon was involved in the sale of CAN's confidential files when the organization was in bankruptcy proceedings. Individuals that had confided in the prior version of the CAN organization expressed anxiety about their confidential files being sold to other groups, but Moxon stated: "People who have committed crimes don't want them to be revealed." Moxon's former legal associate, Scientologist Steven Hayes, purchased the assets of the Cult Awareness Network in bankruptcy court. In 2000, Moxon co-authored a paper on the Cult Awareness Network with Anson D. Shupe and Susan E. Darnell. The paper, titled "CAN, We Hardly Knew Ye: Sex, Drugs, Deprogrammers' Kickbacks, and Corporate Crime in the (Old) Cult Awareness Network", was presented at the 2000 meeting of the Society for the Scientific Study of Religion in Houston, Texas. The old "CAN no longer exists because it was a hate group that destroyed families. I’m very proud of what I’ve done," said Moxon in a statement in The American Lawyer.

According to a Scientology publication, Moxon utilized Scientology doctrine to bring about the demise of the Cult Awareness Network. The publication, authored by Scientology official Kurt Weiland, stated: "A civil case was filed by the victim against [Rick] Ross and the Cult Awareness Network. This time he had an attorney who knew what he was doing and understood PTS/SP tech! The attorney was a Scientologist and OT [Operating Thetan] Rick Moxon." "PTS/SP tech" is Scientology terminology referring to the organization's founder L. Ron Hubbard's prescribed tactics of handling enemies called "suppressive persons" (SPs) and their associates, called "potential trouble sources" (PTSs). The Cult Awareness Network was seen by Scientology as a "SP" organization.

=== Subsequent legal efforts ===
Moxon represented manager Ken Hoden of the Church of Scientology's Golden Era Productions in February 1998 when he filed a restraining order against Keith Henson after Henson protested against Scientology in May 1997 and January 1998 outside the Golden Era film studios in Gilman Hot Springs, California. Moxon had argued that Henson was dangerous based on comments critical of Scientologists he had posted on the Internet, and his knowledge in the fields of cryonics and explosives. Hoden received a temporary restraining order against Henson, but the Riverside Superior Court judge refused to make the restraining order permanent.

In 1999, Moxon represented members of the Seventh-day Adventists and Unification Church in a lawsuit against a Maryland state task force which was investigating the effects of religious cults on college campuses. The Unification Church and Seventh-day Adventists members claimed that their constitutional rights were violated and described the "Task Force to Study the Effects of Cult Activities on Public Senior Higher Education Institutions" as a "religious inquisition".

With fellow Scientology attorney Helena Kobrin, Moxon filed an affidavit in Pinellas-Pasco Circuit Court in March 2000, complaining to the judge about the criminal prosecution of the Church of Scientology related to the death of Lisa McPherson. They claimed that the prosecution held an "extreme religious bias" and a "narrow-minded concept of a church". They defended the practice of the Scientology staffers that had kept Lisa McPherson at the Fort Harrison Hotel in Clearwater, Florida, asserting they had been involved in the "Introspection Rundown", which they called an "entirely religious" practice developed by Scientology founder L. Ron Hubbard. They wrote that "Forcing a Scientologist to receive psychiatric services would be like forcing an Orthodox Jew to eat pork or forcing a devoted Catholic to have an abortion. It is simply unacceptable and unthinkable to our religious faith and conscience." Moxon said that the wrongful death lawsuit filed by members of McPherson's family against the Church of Scientology was "nothing more than a vehicle to say bad things about the church". The criminal prosecution in the Lisa McPherson case was dropped due to issues with record-keeping by the medical examiner; a wrongful death civil suit was settled in 2004.

According to Scientology general counsel Elliot Abelson, the bulk of Moxon's legal work is Scientology-related. In addition to his office with his law firm, as of 1997 Moxon also kept a legal office in the Church of Scientology's headquarters at Hollywood, Los Angeles, California. Moxon has also served as legal advisor to the Scientology-affiliated organization Citizens Commission on Human Rights (CCHR). According to a CCHR press release from 2001, Moxon represented CCHR International as its Commissioner.

In 2014, Moxon sought arbitration through the National Arbitration Forum to have the Internet domain name, KendrickMoxon.com, transferred from Donald Myers to Moxon's ownership. Moxon successfully demonstrated to the Forum arbitrator that Myers "registered and used the domain name in bad faith", and Moxon's petition was granted.

In 2013, Private Investigator Dwayne Powell was arrested on obstruction and prowling charges related to following Ron Miscavige. During the arrest, police found firearms and a homemade silencer. After his arrest, Powell claimed to have been paid $10,000 per week by Scientology through an intermediary. According to the Los Angeles Times, Moxon's firm paid Powell $16,000 and kept Powell on the payroll two years after his arrest.

== Works ==
- Shupe, Anson; Moxon, Kendrick; Darnell, Susan E. (2000). "CAN, We Hardly Knew Ye: Sex, Drugs, Deprogrammers' Kickbacks, and Corporate Crime in the (Old) Cult Awareness Network" (paper). Presented at the 2000 meeting of the Society for the Scientific Study of Religion, Houston, Texas. (Note: Sometimes the Moxon name is omitted from citations to this paper, however Moxon's name is included in the citation in the 2003 book The Oxford Handbook of New Religious Movements.)

== See also ==
- List of Scientology officials
- Scientology and the legal system
