= Carol Giambalvo =

- Organization(s): Cult Awareness Network, reFOCUS, International Cultic Studies Association
- Movement: Anti-cult
- Board member of: International Cultic Studies Association
- Spouse: Noel Giambalvo

Carol Giambalvo (October 29, 1943 - December 2, 2022) was an exit counselor who worked with Cult Awareness Network's New York office and chaired on the Cult Awareness Network's national board of directors from 1988 to 1991, and was also on the International Cultic Studies Association's board of directors headed its Recovery Programs, and was responsible for its outreach program. She co-founded reFOCUS, an anti-cult organization for ex-cult members in the United States.

She got into the profession when her stepdaughter became involved with ISKCON in 1978, The International Society for Krishna Consciousness.

She was based in Flagler Beach, Florida, when she was active as an exit counselor and cult educator.

== Bibliography ==
- "Post-cult Problems: An Exit Counselor's Perspective." in Recovery from Cults: Help for Victims of Psychological and Spiritual Abuse, edited by Michael D. Langone, 148–154. New York and London: W. W. Norton, 1995. Partially available online here.
- Exit Counseling: A Family Intervention. 2nd and rev. ed. Oxford and New York: Oxford University Press, 1992.
- "Book Review – Captive Hearts, Captive Minds: Freedom and Recovery from Cults and Other Abusive Relationships." Cultic Studies Journal 10, no. 1 (1993): 86–90.
- (With Joseph Kelly, Patrick Ryan, and Madeleine Landau Tobias) "Ethical Standards for Thought Reform Consultants." Cultic Studies Journal 13, no. 1 (1996): 95–106.
- (Edited with Herbert L. Rosedale) The Boston Movement: Critical Perspectives on the International Churches of Christ. 2nd rev. ed. Bonita Springs, Florida: American Family Foundation, 1997.
