= The Circle of Friends =

Cult operating out of Morristown, New Jersey

Circle of Friends was a cult that operated in the 1970s, out of Morristown, New Jersey and Washington D.C. Its nominal head was George G. Jurscek, who was born in Hungary c. 1920 and emigrated to the United States, becoming naturalized around 1953. According to the testimony provided by former members, Jurscek gave millenarianist lectures twice a week about "a great political and economic collapse (that) would occur before 2000."

In 1978, The New York Times reported that it appeared to be actually run by Margaret L. Reinauer, Dianne Deming Desiderio, Mary O'Rourke, and Lark Bergwin. The group called themselves a "capitalistic commune" with a mission of making its members "healthy, wealthy, and wise." They were headquartered in the former Saltz Hotel at West Hanover Avenue and Sussex Turnpike in Mount Freedom in Randolph Township, which the group purchased in 1978 for $600,000. At the time the group claimed assets of $6 million.

As of 1978, the group owned multiple properties and businesses, including a security guard service and a real‐estate investment, and construction companies. According to a 1991 article in the journal Security Management, in the 1970s, the Cult drew on Gnostic Christian and anthroposophical teachings to inculcate, in Jurscek's lectures, that the endtime was near and that only the surviving "knowers" would survive. The Circle drew initiates into the cult with messages of special knowledge and a spiritual/racial theory that seduced members into believing that they would be among the surviving Gnostic elite after the apocalypse that was coming. Jursek drew on the popular spiritual teachings of Hal Lindsey and a variety of Hindu teachings about the Kali-Yuga regarding the end-time. More research might be done into the particular syncretic notions that were particular to Jursek's religious teachings within the Circle. Jews and Blacks were prize initiates but the racialist and Gnostic Christian teachings may have alienated minorities. How these theological and end-time teachings might have been integrated into a "capitalist commune" or into Jursek's economic theories remains unclear.

Members of the lower echelon of the group worked primarily as security officers with many working double shifts. Salaries were sent to the group's post office box. Members were encouraged to enroll in colleges, receive education loans, and then defer payment. When charges were brought against the group for the student loan scam, other frauds surfaced. Members would work for two different private security firms at the same time and have someone else sign in for them at one job while they worked another. Sex was used as a means to keep supervisors from revealing the practice to company heads.

— L. Kahaner

In 1988, Jurscek and O'Rourke were tried for conspiracy and fraud on the student-loan defaults. Six former members of the group, including Bergwin and Desiderio, testified for the prosecution. The two were convicted of fraud and conspiracy. They faced up to 20 years imprisonment and fines of up to $200,000 each. In September 1991 Jurscek was sentenced to seven years.

== Deprogrammer activities ==
Galen Kelly worked as a deprogrammer against the group starting in 1978, by offering "voluntary interventions" during which he would approach a member as they entered or left work and offer them the opportunity to see and talk to a trusted family member. In November 1978 the group filed a suit against Galen, asking for a court order forbidding "kidnappings such as the alleged abduction" of a member. In 1990 he was convicted of kidnapping a member of Washington D.C. cell, Debra Dobkowski, and spent 16 months in prison before his conviction was overturned on appeal. Galen claimed Dobkowski and the cult had set him up by having Dobkowski switch guard shifts with her roommate, Beth Bruckert, the actual target of the intervention, that he had offered a voluntary intervention, and that Dobkowski had accompanied him willingly. Dobkowski later pleaded guilty for money laundering crimes associated with her membership in the group and served a 21-month prison sentence.
