= Dialog Center International =

Christian countercult organization

The Dialog Center International (DCI) is a Christian counter-cult organization founded in 1973 by a Danish professor of missiology and ecumenical theology, Dr. Johannes Aagaard (1928–2007).

Considered Christian apologetic and missionary minded, the Dialog Center, led by Aagaard, was for many years the main source of information in Denmark on cults, sects, and new religious movements (NRMs). The Dialog Center is firmly against religious beliefs of cults but promotes dialogue between cult members and their families. It rejects deprograming, believing that it is counterproductive and ineffective, and can harm the relationship between a cult member and concerned family members. It is active in 20 countries. In Asia it also tries to spread Christianity with Buddhists.

According to Mikael Rothstein, an associate professor of religious history at the University of Copenhagen, the Dialog Center International has been greatly influential in promoting a negative public opinion of cults in Denmark and other countries in Europe. Aagaard regarded Scientology as being especially dangerous, but later in his life stated that Islam was an even greater threat. Other concerns included Satanism and New Age groups.

== History ==
Aagaard retired from his position as leader of the organization in 2003 and was replaced by Svend Erik Erasmi Jacobsen (2003-2004), Jens Linderoth (2004-2008) and Tom Thygesen Daugaard (2009-). The danish branch of the organization was discontinued in 2011.

In 2012, the new president of DCI, Lutheran priest Thomas Gandow, was awarded the Order of Merit of the Federal Republic of Germany.

== Impact of DCI in Denmark ==
According to Mikael Rothstein and Armin W. Geertz, Aagaard had a large influence over Denmark's reaction to new religious movements in the late twentieth century. Rothstein and Geertz argue in an article in Nova Religio that Aagaard's push for public education and pedagogical resources on NRMs was a large factor in how the press, schools, and Christian congregations discussed and reacted to cults in Denmark. For example, Jesper Aagaard Petersen argued that DCI had a strong influence over how satanism was perceived in schools and media in Denmark.

== Impact of DCI outside of Denmark ==
The DCI has had a major influence on the anti-cult movements outside of Denmark.

Rothstein and Geertz note that particularly in Eastern Europe and Russia the DCI was active before and after the collapse of the Soviet Union. Russian anti-cultist Alexander L. Dvorkin, for example, was the co-Vice President of the DCI with now-current president Gandow.

Solveiga Krumina-Konkova argues that the Dialog Center contributed significantly to the "rise of antisect hysteria" in Lithuania.

DCI and its local branch in Ireland – Dialogue Ireland – replaced its largest anti-cult/counter-cult organization – the Catholic-ran Cult Awareness Centre – in 1992.

== See also ==
- Christian countercult movement
