= Tim Bowles (attorney) =

American attorney for Scientology

Timothy Bowles
- Occupations: Attorney, executive director
- Organization(s): Youth for Human Rights International; Citizens Commission on Human Rights
- Known for: Church of Scientology International v. Fishman and Geertz
- Website: tbowleslaw.com

Timothy Bowles is an American attorney who served as general legal counsel for the Church of Scientology International for eight years. In addition to his legal practice, he also serves as the executive director of Youth for Human Rights International, is a Commissioner on the Board of Advisors of the Citizens Commission on Human Rights and has helped establish other social organizations sponsored by the Church of Scientology, including Narconon and Applied Scholastics.

Along with Kendrick Moxon and Laurie Bartilson, Bowles was one of the lead attorneys for the Church of Scientology in the oft-cited legal case: Church of Scientology International v. Fishman and Geertz.

== Legal career ==
In the late 1970s, Bowles began his legal career as an attorney for Delphian Foundation (now known as Delphi Schools, an Applied Scholastics educational organization that uses study technology developed by L. Ron Hubbard).

Bowles moved to Southern California in the 1980s where he served as general legal counsel to the Church of Scientology International for several years. Bowles and Kendrick Moxon, in the firm Bowles & Moxon, served as the church's lead counsel in the legal effort that resulted in the church receiving U.S. tax-exempt status in 1993.

Bowles had been a part of the law firm Bowles & Moxon, partnered with Kendrick Moxon. Their law firm acted on behalf of the Church of Scientology. An article in The American Lawyer recounts how the firm of Bowles & Moxon was involved with the filing of 50 civil suits against the Cult Awareness Network by individual Scientologists, many of whom had asserted virtually the same "carbon copy" claims as the other lawsuits. In 1994, the Cult Awareness Network opened a counter-suit against the Church of Scientology, 11 individual Scientologists, and the Los Angeles law firm of Bowles & Moxon.

Tim Bowles was part of the law firm Bowles & Hayes. His partner, Steven Hayes, also a Scientologist, was involved in buying the assets of the Cult Awareness Network after the organization declared bankruptcy.

After leaving that firm, Bowles has continued to work for Scientology entities such as Youth for Human Rights International as executive director, and the Citizens Commission on Human Rights as a Commissioner on the Board of Advisors, as well as representing clients such as Narconon. Representing Youth for Human Rights International in Ghana in 2006, he said, "Ghana should lead the crusade for championing the tenets of United Nations Universal Declaration of Human Rights...through human rights education from an early age", adding that his organization had developed materials to assist in doing so.

On December 19, 2005, he incorporated the firm Law Offices of Timothy Bowles, with two associates.

=== Clients ===
The clients his firm represents include: Airespring, Inc.; Applied Scholastics International, Inc; Castec, Inc.; Consolidated Financial & Insurance Services, Inc.; Cornerstone Pictures; Cushman & Wakefield; Diskeeper Corporation; Eastern Tools & Equipment; The Football Network; Los Angeles Medical Center; McPhee & Associates, Inc.; Mission Renaissance, Inc.; National Foundation of Women Legislators; Omnitronix Inc. (Now Asentria Corp.); Panda Software International; Sterling Management Systems, Inc.; Survival Strategies International; Telsoft Solutions, Inc.; United Merchant Services. As well, he is the agent of service for Hubbard College of Administration and the dissolved Church of Scientology of California.

=== In the news ===
In 1987, Bowles wrote a letter to the St. Petersburg Times, threatening a lawsuit if they were to print a review of the new book L. Ron Hubbard: Messiah or Madman?:

It has come to our attention that [you] are considering publication of a review of L. Ron Hubbard, Messiah or Madman? by Bent Corydon ... it is quite apparent and can be proved that your motives in reviewing this book ... are to attack and denigrate the Church through any vehicle you find available. ... If you forward one of his lies you will find yourself in court facing not only libel and slander charges, but also charges for conspiracy to violate civil rights. If you publish anything at all on it, you may still find yourself defending charges in court in light of what we know about your intentions. We know a whole lot more about your institution and motives than you think.

The newspaper did not comply with Scientology's requests, and published not only the review, but the text of letter as well.

== Personal life ==
Tim Bowles has been a Scientologist since 1975.

== See also ==
- Scientology and the Internet
- Scientology and law
