= Cult Awareness Network =

1978–1996 American organization

- Old logo
- Abbreviation: CAN
- Formation: 1978
- Founder: Ted Patrick
- Dissolved: 1996
- Services: Deprogramming, support and referrals to deprogrammers and exit counselors
- Executive director 1991–1996: Cynthia Kisser
- Co-director 1995–1996, vice president 1992–1995: Rosanne Henry
- Director 1988–1991: Carol Giambalvo
- Director 1982–1987: Reginald Alev
- Key people: Cynthia Kisser, Patricia Ryan, Louis Jolyon West, Margaret Singer, Priscilla Coates, Rick Ross, Steven Hassan, Paul Engel, Janja Lalich, Mike Farrell, Edward Lottick, Sandy Andron (former vice-president), Nancy Miquelon, John Rehling, William Rehling
- Subsidiaries: NARDEC, Free Minds of North Texas
- Formerly called: FREECOG, Citizen's Freedom Foundation (CFF)

The Cult Awareness Network (CAN) was an anti-cult organization founded by deprogrammer Ted Patrick that provided information on groups it considered "cults", as well as support and referrals to deprogrammers. It operated (initially under the name “Citizens’ Freedom Foundation”) from the mid 1970s to the mid 1990s in the United States.

The Cult Awareness Network was the most notable organization to emerge from the anti-cult movement in America. In the 1970s, a growing number of large and small new religious movements caused alarm in some sections of the community, based in part on the fear of "brainwashing" or "mind control" allegedly employed by these groups. The Cult Awareness Network presented itself as a source of information about "cults"; by 1991 it was monitoring over 200 groups that it referred to as "mind-control cults". It also promoted a form of coercive intervention by self-styled "deprogrammers" who would, for a significant fee, forcibly detain or even abduct the cult member and subject them to a barrage of attacks on their beliefs, supposedly in order to counter the effects of the brainwashing. The practice, which could involve criminal actions such as kidnapping and false imprisonment, generated controversy, and Ted Patrick and others faced both civil and criminal proceedings.

After CAN lost a lawsuit and filed for bankruptcy in 1996, lawyer and Scientologist Steven L. Hayes acquired the rights to CAN's name, logo, PO box, and hot-line phone number, and licensed the name to the "Foundation for Religious Freedom", who established the New Cult Awareness Network. Hayes made the purchase with funds raised from private donations, not from the Church of Scientology, although a number of scientologists had been among the most active participants in a coalition of religious freedom advocates from whom he had collected money. The Church of Scientology had previously been one of CAN's main targets.

== History ==
In the United States in the early 1970s there was an increasing number of New Religious Movements. In 1971, Ted Patrick founded FREECOG (Parents Committee to Free Our Sons and Daughters from the Children of God). In 1974, he founded the more wide-ranging "Citizen's Freedom Foundation" (CFF), and began offering 'deprogramming' services to people who wanted to break a family member's connection to an NRM. The deprogramming methods involved abduction, physical restraint, detention over days or weeks, food and sleep deprivation, prolonged verbal and emotional abuse, and desecration of the symbols of the victim's faith. The perpetrators' justification for these actions was that the individual had been "brainwashed", and was not amenable to reason.

Brainwashing theory denied the possibility of authentic spiritual choice for an NRM member, proposing instead that such individuals were subject to systematic mind control programs that overrode their capacity for independent volition. Ted Patrick's theory of brainwashing was that individuals were hypnotized by brainwaves projected from a recruiter's eyes and fingertips, after which the state was maintained by constant indoctrination, a totalistic environment and self-hypnosis. Most academic research, however, indicated that the reasons for people joining, remaining in, or leaving NRMs were complex, varied from group to group and individual to individual, and generally reflected the continued presence of a capacity for individual responsibility and choice.

Patrick's organizations were merged in 1978 to become the Cult Awareness Network after the mass-suicides in Jonestown. CAN became the most prominent group in the emerging national anti-cult movement of the 70s and 80s. The anti-cult movement lobbied for state and national legislative action to legitimize its activities, and although this had very limited success, the movement was nevertheless able to forge alliances with a number of governmental agencies. This was primarily on the back of its propagation of the "cult/mind control ideology", which succeeded in turning affiliation with NRMs into an issue of public—rather than private—concern, and gave a pseudo-legitimacy to the anti-cultists' more extreme claims and actions. By 1991, the Cult Awareness Network had twenty-three chapters dedicated to monitoring over two hundred groups that it referred to as "mind control cults".

Although CFF and CAN were in favor of deprogramming, they distanced themselves from the practice from the late 1970s onwards. Despite this apparent repudiation, however, they continued the practice. In the 1980s, CAN referred thousands of paying clients to activist members who kept lists of deprogrammers. The total number that occurred is unknown, but in 1980 Ted Patrick claimed to have been hired over 2000 times as a professional abductor. Many other operators emerged both during and after the period in which he was active, many of them trained by him. Deprogramming was an integral part of the anti-cult ideology and economy, and was seen as an effective response to the demand emanating from people who wanted a family member extracted, but it also clashed with the need for anti-cult organizations to present themselves as 'educational' associations (CFF, for example, received tax-exempt status as an educational trust). This, along with its tenuous legal and moral status, meant that deprogramming tended to be publicly disavowed, while its practice continued clandestinely. The Cult Awareness Network became the subject of controversy when Patrick and other CAN-associated figures, such as Galen Kelly and Donald Moore, were convicted of crimes committed in the course of deprogrammings.

Patricia Ryan, the daughter of US Congressman Leo J. Ryan (D-Millbrae, California), who died from gunfire while investigating conditions at the Peoples Temple compound in Jonestown, Guyana, was president of CAN from 1990 to 1993. Actor Mike Farrell served on the board of advisors of CAN.

In 1990, the Cult Awareness Network established the "John Gordon Clark Fund", in honor of psychiatrist John G. Clark, who had given testimony about Scientology and other groups. The fund was established to assist former members of destructive cults.

Detractors Susan E. Darnell, Anson D. Shupe, and Church of Scientology attorney Kendrick Moxon charged that CAN deliberately provided a distorted picture of the groups it tracked.

In 1991, Time magazine quoted then CAN director Cynthia Kisser in its article "The Thriving Cult of Greed and Power". Kisser stated: "Scientology is quite likely the most ruthless, the most classically terroristic, the most litigious and the most lucrative cult the country has ever seen. No cult extracts more money from its members". This quote has since been referenced verbatim in other secondary sources discussing Scientology. These comments and other forms of criticism from CAN garnered the attention of the Church of Scientology and Landmark Education, and both separately began litigation proceedings against the organization.

CAN declared bankruptcy after a jury found that CAN conspired to violate the civil rights and religious liberties of Jason Scott, a Pentecostal, who had been forcibly kidnapped and subjected to a failed deprogramming by Rick Ross, a CAN-referred deprogrammer, and others. The court ordered CAN to pay a judgment of 1 million USD. The large award was intended to deter similar conduct in the future; the court noted that the defendants were unable to appreciate the maliciousness of their conduct towards the deprogrammee, and portrayed themselves, throughout the entire process of litigation, as victims of the alleged agenda of the plaintiff's attorney, Church of Scientology attorney Kendrick Moxon.

In 1996, CAN went bankrupt and its assets were bought by a coalition of organizations and individuals, including Scientologists. The bankruptcy trustee told The Washington Post that he put CAN's name-brand assets on the auction block only because Kisser herself asked to buy them. As a result of a legal settlement with Landmark Education, CAN agreed not to sell copies of Outrageous Betrayal, a book critical of Werner Erhard, for five years after it emerged from bankruptcy proceedings. Following its bankruptcy, the files of the "Old CAN" were made available to scholars for study and transferred to a university library.

=== Deprogramming referral kickback scheme – NARDEC ===
The National Resource Development and Economic Council (NARDEC) was formed in the mid-1980s and had become institutionalized as a special unit within CAN by 1987. The unit's role was to provide referrals to deprogrammers in exchange for a "kickback" – either in cash or in the form of a tax-deductible "donation" or "commissions" which were then funneled back to national CAN headquarters.

Journalist Nora Hamerman, in writing about the Dobkowski deprogramming, referred to CAN as "a clearinghouse for kidnap-for-hire rings", with her phrase affirmed by scholarly researchers as "an apt description" of CAN. Hamerman referred to the "financial symbiosis between CAN and coercive deprogrammers".

CAN-associated deprogrammers included Steven Hassan, Carol Giambalvo, Rick Ross, Ted Patrick, Galen Kelly David Clark, and Robert Point.

== Reception ==
The Jason Scott case in 1995 demonstrated the ongoing involvement of the "Old CAN" in deprogramming referrals. Also, in 1993, the trial of deprogrammer Galen Kelly revealed that the "Old CAN" had, contrary to its stated policy, paid Kelly a monthly stipend during the 1990s.

Sociologist Anson Shupe, Susan E. Darnell, and Church of Scientology attorney Kendrick Moxon have alleged that the "Old CAN" could be described as a criminal organization operating in large part for the profit to certain actors, and that it cultivated a hypocritical and deceptive public persona. They alleged that despite public denials, the "Old CAN" operating policy included routine referrals to coercive deprogrammers, citing, among others, FBI wiretap evidence documenting frequent, casual contact between coercive deprogrammers and Cynthia Kisser, the executive director of the "Old CAN". They further allege money laundering, and personal enrichment by some "Old CAN" officials, as well as the use of legal and illegal drugs by deprogrammers during deprogrammings, and occurrences of sexual intercourse between deprogrammers and deprogrammees. Shupe and Darnell expanded on these topics in their 2006 book Agents of Discord, referencing their prior work with Kendrick Moxon.

In chapter 8 of The Oxford Handbook of New Religious Movements, Shupe, Bromley, and Darnell state that the "Old CAN" countered fiscal challenges by soliciting donations for referrals whereby exit counsellors or deprogrammers either made donations themselves, or had client families make donations to the "Old CAN", and that these donations made up as much as one-third of "Old CAN" revenues. While the "Old CAN" was set up as a tax-exempt organization serving educational purposes, coercive deprogramming referrals remained an integral part of its economy and response pattern, a contradiction that was concealed, but not resolved by the "Old CAN" publicly renouncing deprogramming while covertly engaging in referrals. The authors state that ironically the "Old CAN" was finally "undone by the same kind of civil suit strategy it had employed against [new religious movements], in a case involving the same type of coercive practices it accused cults of employing, and with the result that its name and assets were purchased by members of one of its most bitter enemies", the Church of Scientology.

=== Landmark Education ===
According to the (Old) Cult Awareness Network's executive director, Landmark Education and the Church of Scientology were the two groups for which CAN received the highest number of inquiries from concerned relatives – twenty-five per month per group. In an interview, CAN's executive director emphasized that the label "cult" with regard to Landmark Education was not important; but rather greater scrutiny of its practices was needed. Specifically, CAN stressed concerning characteristics, such as "the long hours during which the participant is in the organization's total control, receiving input from only one source, removed from any support system except for the seminar group itself". In 1994, Landmark Education Corporation sued the Cult Awareness Network for 40 million USD, claiming that CAN had labeled Landmark Education as a cult. The case itself involved a dispute over the legality and applicable usage of what William Joseph Matthews termed "cult indoctrination procedures". CAN later settled and made a statement that it did not consider Landmark Education a cult, as part of the settlement agreement.

During the litigation proceedings between Landmark Education and the Cult Awareness Network, Landmark Education spent months attempting to compel legal journalist Steven Pressman to respond to deposition questions aimed at obtaining the confidential sources he used for research on his book about Werner Erhard, Outrageous Betrayal. Though the deposition questions were brought under the pretext of compelling discovery for use in Landmark Education's lawsuit against CAN, Pressman concluded that the deposition questioning was mainly a form of harassment. The discovery commissioner who entered an interim order in the matter, commented that "it does not appear that the information sought [from Mr. Pressman] is directly relevant or goes to the heart of the [CAN] action, or that alternative sources have been exhausted or are inadequate". The action against Pressman was dropped after the Cult Awareness Network litigation was settled. As a result of the Cult Awareness Network settlement with Landmark Education, CAN agreed to cease selling copies of Outrageous Betrayal for at least five years. From the resolution of CAN's board of directors: "In the interests of settling a dispute and in deference to Landmark's preference, however, CAN now agrees not to sell the Pressman Book for at least five years after CAN emerges from bankruptcy". CAN's executive director maintained that the purpose of Landmark Education's lawsuits was not to recover lost funds, but to "gag critics". Along with Scientology, Landmark Education was granted access to Cult Awareness Network's files, which contained phone records and data on individuals who had previously sought information on these groups.

=== Church of Scientology's response ===
The Church of Scientology had long characterized the Cult Awareness Network as both an opponent of religious freedom and a "hate group". In 1990, a woman named Jolie Steckart, posing as Laura Terepin, applied to volunteer for the (original) Cult Awareness Network. Bob Minton later hired a private investigator to look into this, and in 1998 discovered that she was actually a "deep undercover agent", who was managed by David Lee, a private investigator hired by the Church of Scientology. Steckart had also attempted to infiltrate the Scientology-critical organization FACTNet.

In 1991, over fifty Scientologists from across the United States filed civil suits against the Cult Awareness Network, many of whom used the same carbon copy claims through influence from the Los Angeles, California law firm Bowles & Moxon. In addition, Scientologists filed dozens of discrimination complaints against CAN, with state human rights commissions in the United States. The Cult Awareness Network, which ran on a budget of 300,000 USD per year, was unable to cope with this amount of litigation. By 1994, it had been dropped by all of its insurance companies, and still owed tens of thousands of dollars in legal fees. Kendrick Moxon, chief attorney for the Church of Scientology, had stated that the lawsuits were brought to address discrimination against individuals who wanted to reform the Cult Awareness Network. These fifty individuals had all simultaneously tried to join the organization. When the Cult Awareness Network's executive director turned down the applications for fear that the new Scientologist applicants would overtake control of CAN, they sued in separate lawsuits claiming religious discrimination. Though Moxon handled the litigation for all of the lawsuits, the Church of Scientology maintained that it did not provide the financial backing for the suits. Moxon did acknowledge that his firm Moxon & Bowles had represented the plaintiffs in the case at virtually no charge, and that Scientology churches "helped a little bit, but very little", with the litigation costs.

Daniel Leipold, the attorney who represented CAN in the suits, believed that the Church of Scientology did indeed have a role in the financial backing of the suits, stating, "for every nickel we spent, they spent at least a dollar". Leipold also stated that when he began to take statements from some of the Scientologist plaintiffs in the process of his defense of CAN, "[s]everal of the plaintiffs said they had not seen or signed the lawsuits, even though the court papers bore their signatures". One Scientologist plaintiff told CAN attorneys that he could not recall how he initially got the contact information of CAN officials, or who had asked him to write to the organization. Another Scientologist later fired his lawyer and asked a judge to dismiss his own case against CAN, saying that Eugene Ingram, a private investigator for the Church of Scientology, had paid him three hundred dollars to have lunch where he agreed to be a plaintiff and signed a blank page for Church of Scientology attorneys. CAN attorney Leipold stated, "Scientology planned, instigated, coordinated and sponsored a plan to subject CAN to multiple lawsuits in multiple jurisdictions in order to overwhelm and eliminate it or take it over and control it". Frank Oliver, who was until 1993 an operative in the Church of Scientology's Office of Special Affairs division (OSA), asserted that his last assignment with the OSA branch was to assist Kendrick Moxon in developing a special unit to target the Cult Awareness Network. Oliver stated that this unit was tasked with recruiting plaintiffs to sue the Cult Awareness Network, with the intention that these lawsuits would put CAN out of business. In 1995, members of the Church of Scientology picketed the home of ex-Scientology staff members Robert Vaughn Young and Stacy Young. A Scientology spokeswoman called it "a peaceful First Amendment demonstration to protest the Youngs' involvement with the Cult Awareness Network". In a 2005 interview with the Pittsburgh Post-Gazette, a Church of Scientology spokesperson stated that the Church was not responsible for the litigation leading to CAN's bankruptcy.

Church of Scientology leader David Miscavige appeared in his first ever interview with the media on the program Nightline on February 14, 1992, and was interviewed by Ted Koppel. Miscavige stated that he believed Scientology did not "lend itself well to the press", and he criticized a piece on Scientology that aired on Nightline shortly before his interview. In his criticism of the piece, Miscavige asserted that Nightline correspondents had only interviewed members of CAN, stating, "For instance, something that isn't mentioned in there is that every single detractor on there is part of a religious hate group called Cult Awareness Network and their sister group called American Family Foundation. Now, I don't know if you've heard of these people, but it's the same as the KKK would be with the blacks. I think if you interviewed a neo-Nazi and asked them to talk about the Jews, you would get a similar result to what you have here." Koppel then posited the notion that others critical of Scientology were less apt to come forward and speak publicly due to fears of potential recrimination from the Church. In 1994, the Cult Awareness Network opened a counter-suit against the Church of Scientology, eleven individual Scientologists and the Los Angeles law firm of Bowles and Moxon.

== Jason Scott case ==
In 1995, CAN, and two co-defendants were found guilty of negligence and conspiracy to violate the civil rights and religious liberties of Jason Scott, then a member of the Life Tabernacle Church, a small United Pentecostal congregation in Bellevue, Washington. Rick Alan Ross was acquitted in the criminal trial. A CAN volunteer had referred Ross to Scott's mother, endorsing his ability as a deprogrammer. The mother thereupon retained Ross's services. In a civil trial, Ross was ordered to pay more than 3 million USD in damages; CAN, having referred Ross to Scott's mother, was ordered to pay a judgement of 1 million USD. The court found that CAN volunteers had routinely referred callers to deprogrammers.

CAN appealed the decision but a three-judge panel of the 9th U.S. Circuit Court of Appeals upheld the award, two of the three judges finding against CAN, with the third judge dissenting. The full 9th Circuit court then voted against reconsidering the case. The U.S. Supreme Court rejected a final appeal by CAN in March 1999.

Ross went into bankruptcy, but emerged in December 1996 when Scott reconciled with his mother and settled with Ross for five-thousand dollars and 200 hours of Ross's services "as an expert consultant and intervention specialist". Scott fired his attorney Kendrick Moxon the next day and retained long-time Church of Scientology opponent Graham Berry as his lawyer instead.

After Scott fired Moxon, Moxon filed emergency motions in two states and alleged Scott had been influenced by supporters of CAN to hire Berry as his lawyer. "He's really been abused by CAN and disgustingly abused by this guy Berry", said Moxon in a statement in The Washington Post. Moxon, who had argued in the case that Ross and associates had hindered a competent adult's freedom to make his own religious decisions, immediately filed court papers seeking to rescind the settlement and appoint a guardian for Scott, whom he called "incapacitated". That effort failed.

Scott stated that he felt he had been manipulated as part of the Church of Scientology's plan to destroy CAN. According to the Chicago Tribune, Scott and his relatives felt Moxon was not paying enough attention to Scott's financial judgment, and was instead focused on a "personal vendetta" against CAN. Moxon himself was a Scientologist and former official of the Church of Scientology. "Basically, Jason said he was tired of being the poster boy for the Scientologists. My son has never been a member of the Church of Scientology. When he was approached by Moxon, he was lured by his promises of a $1 million settlement, so he went for it", said Scott's mother Katherine Tonkin in a statement to the Chicago Tribune.

=== Demise of the "Old CAN" ===
Scott sold his $1,875,000 USD judgment against CAN for $25,000 USD to Gerry Beany, a Scientologist represented by Moxon, whereby Beany had the largest claim against CAN in the bankruptcy proceeding. In satisfaction of that debt, CAN agreed to give Beany all of CAN's files and records. Beany, in turn, donated the records to the Foundation for Religious Freedom.

That bankruptcy was the demise of the "Old CAN", marking the end of the cult wars—at least in North America. Controversies surrounding new religious movements continued, but the debate thereafter largely moved to other arenas than the courts.

== Waco siege ==
According to Alexander Cockburn, the role of the Cult Awareness Network and its representatives "may well have been crucial" in the law enforcement actions during the 1993 Waco siege. A series of newspaper articles in the Waco Tribune-Herald and allegations of child abuse by CAN Executive Director Priscilla Coates were followed by increasing interest and investigation by law enforcement.

On 8 April 1993, during the siege of the Branch Davidians compound, CAN president Patricia Ryan (daughter of slain U.S. Representative Leo Ryan) stated that the FBI should use any means necessary to arrest David Koresh, including lethal force. Throughout the siege, representatives from CAN offered unsolicited assistance to the Bureau of Alcohol, Tobacco, Firearms and Explosives and FBI. Representatives also made numerous media appearances, including making statements that the FBI commander felt "could set back negotiations substantially". The siege ultimately ended on April 19 with the death of 76 people, including Koresh.

In a 1996 joint hearing before the United States Congress on the Waco siege entitled Activities of Federal Law Enforcement Agencies Toward the Branch Davidians, it was stated into the record that publicists for the New Alliance Party had circulated a report to Congress and the media called "What is the Cult Awareness Network and What Role Did it Play in Waco?" Testimony was also entered into the record stating, "Their report relied on [conspiracy theorist] Linda Thompson, organizations created or funded by the Church of Scientology and the Unification Church, long-time cult apologist Dean Kelley, and others who would minimize public concern about destructive cult phenomena".

== 60 Minutes special report ==
In 1997, two years after the Scott case, CBS News aired a 60 Minutes special on the case. Among other things, it discovered that a signatory who had been responsible for one of the most damaging affidavits against CAN had renounced his testimony. 60 Minutes also reported that a private investigator could find no evidence regarding CAN's alleged use of deprogrammers. Given this evidence sociologist Stephen Kent concludes that the case against CAN was "weak".

== See also ==
- New Cult Awareness Network
- International Cultic Studies Association
- Jason Scott case
