= Johannes Aagaard =

Danish theologian and evangelist (1928–2007)

Johannes Monrad Aagaard (29 April 1928 – 23 March 2007) was a Danish Christian theologian and evangelist. He was a professor of missiology at the University of Aarhus. He founded the Department of Missiology and Ecumenical Theology and the Center for New Religious Studies at the University of Aarhus. He was active in the Christian countercult movement as the founder of the Dialog Center International, an international educational organization concerned with groups it defines as cults and other new religious movements. He was a former president of the International Association for Mission Studies. He was a member of the Faith and Order Commission and was on the board of the Theological Educational Fund. He co-founded and chaired the Nordic Network for Missiology and Ecumenical Studies.

Aagaard had traveled to Asia and was concerned about Buddhism and other Eastern religions, which he felt were gaining influence in Europe. In 1973, Aagaard founded the Danish Dialog Center, which was part of the Dialog Center International, which was later greatly influential in promoting a negative public opinion of cults in Denmark and other European nations. He regarded Scientology as being especially dangerous, but later in his life stated that Islam was an even greater threat. Other concerns included Satanism and New Age groups. Aagaard cooperated with both religious and secular anti-cultists, but opposed deprogramming of cult members since he felt that it was ineffective and often counterproductive. He retired from the Dialog Center in 2002.

He was married in 1954 to Anna Marie Aagaard (b. 1935), the first Danish woman to obtain a doctorate in theology.

== Bibliography ==
- Mission, Konfession, Kirche: Die Problematik ihrer Integration im 19. Jahrhundert in Deutschland, Gleerup, 1967
- "The First Furlough", International Review of Mission 56, no. 224 (1967): 439–443
- "Trends in Missiological Thinking During the Sixties", International Review of Mission 62, no. 245 (1973): 8–25
- Missions from the north: Nordic Missionary Council, 50 years, co-author with Carl F. Hallencreutz, Universitetsforlaget, 1974
- "The Truth Which is at Both Extremes: A Reaction", International Review of Mission 66, no. 261 (1977): 29–31
- New religious movements in Europe, co-author with Helle Meldgaard, Aarhus University Press, 1997
- Identity in conflict: classical Christian faith and religio occulta, co-author with Moti Lal Pandit, Helle Meldgaard, Mike Garde, Munshiram Manoharlal Publishers, 1998
- The hidden way: a study in modern religious esoterism, co-author with Moti Lal Pandit, Munshiram Manoharlal Publishers, 2002
- "Occultisme/Satanism and the Christian faith" in Le Défi Magique, Volume 2: Satanisme, Sorcellerie, edited by Jean-Baptiste Martin and Massimo Introvigne, Presses Universitaires de Lyon, 1994
