= Moxon & Kobrin =

Law firm of Church of Scientology

Moxon & Kobrin is a "captive" law firm of the Church of Scientology, meaning that it has no other clients apart from Scientology-affiliated entities. Its headquarters are located in Los Angeles, California, in the Wilshire Center Business Improvement District. Its members are: Kendrick Moxon, Helena Kobrin, and Ava Paquette.

The firm is best known for being church staff and attorneys for the Church of Scientology, working for the Religious Technology Center, which controls the trademarks of Scientology and the copyright of the works of L. Ron Hubbard.

== History ==
Kendrick Moxon holds a B.A. in anthropology and a Doctorate of Jurisprudence from George Mason University. Before becoming Scientology's lead in-house attorney, he worked in the Church's Guardian's Office (subsequently usurped by the Office of Special Affairs) under Mary Sue Hubbard. During Operation Snow White, in which eleven Scientologists were convicted in federal court, Moxon was listed as an unindicted co-conspirator for providing false handwriting samples to the FBI in response to a Grand Jury subpoena.

According to the Phoenix New Times, Moxon has stated that "he didn't knowingly supply false handwriting samples and that the stipulation of evidence was something signed by church officials but written by FBI agents. He says the matter was thoroughly investigated by two bar associations – in D.C. and in California – before they admitted him as an attorney. Moxon is in good standing with the bar associations in both jurisdictions."

In 2013, private investigator Dwayne Powell was arrested on obstruction and prowling charges related to following Ron Miscavige. During the arrest, police found firearms and a homemade silencer. After his arrest, Powell claimed to have been paid $10,000 per week by Scientology through an intermediary. Moxon and Kobrin paid Powell $16,000 and kept him on the payroll two years after his arrest.

Helena Kempner Kobrin (born April 27, 1948) received her B.A. at Hofstra University and her J.D. at Seton Hall University. She was admitted to the bar in 1978, and at the California bar in 1991. She caused controversy on usenet in the mid-1990s when she tried to get the newsgroup alt.religion.scientology shut down, and later e-mailed legal warnings to participants who had quoted as few as six lines of Scientology texts.

== Notable cases ==
- Frank Oliver, a former member of the Office of Special Affairs, alleged that he worked with Kendrick Moxon and others in a campaign against the Cult Awareness Network (CAN). Plaintiffs were recruited to participate in litigation which ultimately forced the CAN into bankruptcy.
- In 2002 Moxon & Kobrin served notice to search engine Google, demanding that Operation Clambake be removed from their search listings. They alleged that the site "contains literally hundreds of our clients' copyrighted works and federally registered trademarks." Among the specific Church documents they objected to xenu.net's coverage of were those dealing with dead agenting, fair game, security checking of children, Xenu, Helatrobus, and various other space opera in Scientology topics. Google temporarily complied but eventually restored most of xenu.net's pages back to their results.

== See also ==
- Scientology and the Internet
- Scientology and the legal system
