= Deprogramming =

Coercive intervention against a person's beliefs

Deprogramming is a controversial tactic that uses coercive intervention in the attempt to dissuade someone from "strongly held convictions" such as religious beliefs. Deprogramming purports to assist a person who holds a particular belief system—of a kind considered harmful by those initiating the deprogramming—to change those beliefs and sever connections to the group associated with them. Typically, people identifying themselves as deprogrammers are hired by a person's relatives, often parents of adult children. The subject of the deprogramming is usually forced to undergo the procedure, which might last days or weeks, against their will.

Methods and practices of deprogramming are varied but have often involved kidnapping and false imprisonment, which have sometimes resulted in criminal convictions. The practice has led to controversies over freedom of religion, civil rights, criminality, and the use of violence. Proponents of deprogramming present the practice as a necessary counter-measure to the systematic "brainwashing" procedures allegedly employed by religious groups, which they claim deprive the individual of their capacity for free choice.

== Background ==
In the United States in the early 1970s, there was an increasing number of New Religious Movements. Ted Patrick, the "father of deprogramming", formed an organization he called "The Citizens' Freedom Foundation" and began offering 'deprogramming' services to people who wanted to break a family member's connection to an NRM. Patrick's methods involved abduction, physical restraint, detention over days or weeks while maintaining a constant presence with the victim, food and sleep deprivation, prolonged verbal and emotional abuse, and desecration of the symbols of the victim's faith.

Deprogrammers justified their actions by applying a theory of "brainwashing" to New Religious Movements. Brainwashing theory denied the possibility of authentic spiritual choice for an NRM member, proposing instead that such individuals were subject to systematic mind control programs that overrode their capacity for independent volition. Ted Patrick's theory of brainwashing was that individuals were hypnotized by brainwaves projected from a recruiter's eyes and fingertips, after which the state was maintained by constant indoctrination, a totalistic environment, and self-hypnosis. Most academic research, however, indicated that the reasons for people joining, remaining in, or leaving NRMs were complex, varied from group to group and individual to individual, and generally reflected the continued presence of a capacity for individual responsibility and choice.

The Citizens' Freedom Foundation, which later became known as the Cult Awareness Network, became the most prominent group in the emerging national anti-cult movement of the 1970s and 80s. The anti-cult movement lobbied for state and national legislative action to legitimize its activities, and although this had very limited success, the movement was nevertheless able to forge alliances with a number of governmental agencies. This was primarily on the back of its propagation of the brainwashing/mind control ideology, which succeeded in turning affiliation with NRMs into an issue of public—rather than private—concern and gave a pseudo-legitimacy to the anti-cultists' more extreme claims and actions.

Although the CFF and CAN were in favor of deprogramming, they distanced themselves from the practice from the late 1970s onwards. Despite this apparent repudiation, however, they continued the practice. CFF and CAN referred thousands of paying clients to activist members who kept lists of deprogrammers. The total number that occurred is unknown, but in 1980 Ted Patrick claimed to have been hired over 2000 times as a professional abductor. Many other operators emerged both during and after the period in which he was active, many of them trained by him. The practice of deprogramming was an integral part of the anti-cult ideology and economy, and was seen as an effective response to the demand emanating from people who wanted a family member extracted, but it also clashed with the need for anti-cult organizations to present themselves as "educational" associations (the CFF, for example, received tax-exempt status as an educational trust). This, along with its tenuous legal and moral status, meant that deprogramming tended to be publicly disavowed, while its practice continued clandestinely.

== Use of violence ==
Deprogramming became a controversial practice due to the violent and illegal nature of some of its methods. Various academics have commented on the practice. Sociologist Anson D. Shupe and others wrote that deprogramming is comparable to exorcism in both methodology and manifestation. Professor of Sociology and Judicial Studies James T. Richardson described deprogramming as a "private, self-help process whereby participants in unpopular new religious movements (NRMs) were forcibly removed from the group, incarcerated, and put through radical resocialization processes that were supposed to result in their agreeing to leave the group." Law professor Douglas Laycock, author of Religious Liberty: The Free Exercise Clause, wrote:

Beginning in the 1970s, many parents responded to the initial conversion with "deprogramming." The essence of deprogramming was to physically abduct the convert, isolate him and physically restrain him, and barrage him with continuous arguments and attacks against his new religion, threatening to hold him forever until he agreed to leave it.

Deprogrammers generally operated on the presumption that the people they were paid to extract from religious organizations were victims of mind control or brainwashing. Since the theory was that such individuals were incapable of rational thought, extreme measures were thought to be justified for their own good, up to and including the use of criminal violence. Ted Patrick was eventually tried and convicted of multiple felonies relating to kidnapping and false imprisonment of deprogramming subjects.

Violence of one degree or another is common to all anecdotal accounts of deprogramming. There are numerous testimonies from people who describe being threatened with a gun, beaten, denied food and sleep, and sexually assaulted. In these accounts, the deprogramming usually begins with the victim being forced into a vehicle and taken to a place where they are isolated from everyone but their captors. Told that they would not be released until they renounce their beliefs, they are then subjected to days and sometimes weeks of verbal, emotional, psychological, and/or physical pressure until the demands of their abductors are satisfied.

According to sociologist Eileen Barker, "One does not have to rely on the victims for stories of violence: Ted Patrick, one of the most notorious deprogrammers used by CAGs [cult-awareness groups] (who has spent several terms in prison for his exploits) openly boasts about some of the violence he employed." A number of other prominent members of "cult-awareness groups" have been convicted of violent crimes committed in the course of deprogrammings.

Carol Giambalvo, who worked for the Cult Awareness Network in the 1980s (later advocating for "voluntary exit counseling" and "thought reform consultation") said that although abductions certainly occurred, the more common practice was to forcefully detain people in their own homes, or in a cabin or motel room. Giambalvo tells of "horror stories" of restraint, beatings, use of handcuffs and weapons, sexual abuse, and even rape, although she claims that these were only used in a minority of cases and that deprogramming "helped to free many individuals".

== Rationale and effectiveness ==
Carol Giambalvo described the reasoning behind deprogramming thus:

It was believed that the hold of the brainwashing over the cognitive processes of a cult member needed to be broken – or "snapped" as some termed it – by means that would shock or frighten the cultist into thinking again. For that reason, in some cases cult leader's pictures were burned or there were highly confrontational interactions between deprogrammers and cultist. What was often sought was an emotional response to the information, the shock, the fear, and the confrontation.

Another associate of Ted Patrick, Sylvia Buford, identified five stages in the deprogramming which would, ideally, bring the subject to a recognition of their condition:

1. Discrediting the authority figure
2. Presenting contradictions - comparing the ideology with the reality; for example, "How can he preach love when he exploits people?"
3. The breaking point, at which the subject begins to accept the deprogrammer's position and begins doubting the ideology
4. Self-expression: the subject begins to voice criticisms and complaints against the cult.
5. Identification and transference: the subject begins to identify with the deprogrammers, thinking as an opponent of the cult rather than as a member.

According to Giambalvo and others, however, deprogramming frequently failed completely to achieve the desired outcome and often caused significant harm. While some advocates claimed a high success rate, studies show that natural attrition rates are actually higher than those achieved by deprogramming interventions.

Professor of psychiatry Saul V. Levine suggests that it is doubtful that deprogramming helps many people and goes on to say that it actually causes harm to the victim by the very nature of deprogramming. For deprogramming to work, the victim must be convinced that they joined a religious group against their will. They then must renounce responsibility and accept that in some mysterious way that their minds were controlled. He argues that deprogramming destroys a person's identity and is likely to create permanent anxiety about freedom of choice and leave the deprogrammed subject dependent upon the guidance and advice of others.

The Dialog Center International (DCI) a major Christian counter-cult organization founded in 1973 by a Danish professor of missiology and ecumenical theology, Johannes Aagaard, rejects deprogramming, believing that it is counterproductive, ineffective, and can harm the relationship between a cult member and concerned family members.

== Government ==
Deprogrammers have sometimes operated with overt or tacit support of law enforcement and judicial officials. Richardson sees government involvement in deprogramming as existing on a continuum from implicit approval to active involvement. In the United States, where there are First Amendment protections for religious groups, government officials and agencies frequently "turned a blind eye" to the activities of deprogrammers. In China, government agencies have at times promoted activities resembling deprogramming to enforce official views of "correct" beliefs and behaviors, for example in the suppression of the Falun Gong movement. This can involve "vigorous, even violent, efforts to dissuade people from participating in groups deemed unacceptable to the government" and have been "given legal sanction by the passage of laws that make illegal the activities or even the beliefs of the unpopular movement or group being targeted".

In the United States—in New York, Kansas, Nebraska, Connecticut, Illinois, New Jersey, Ohio, Oregon and Texas—lawmakers unsuccessfully attempted to legalize involuntary deprogramming, either through a deprogramming bill or conservatorship legislation. In New York, two bills were actually passed by the legislature (in 1980 and 1981), but both were vetoed by Governor Hugh Carey because of their violation of religious and other constitutional freedoms. In other states the bills failed to pass the legislature.

== Controversy and related issues ==
In the United States, from the mid-1970s and throughout the 1980s mind control was a widely accepted theory in public opinion, and the vast majority of newspaper and magazine accounts of deprogrammings assumed that recruits' relatives were well justified to seek conservatorships and to hire deprogrammers.

One disturbing aspect from a civil rights point of view, was that people hiring deprogrammers would use deception or other ethically questionable methods—including kidnapping—to get their relative into deprogrammers' hands, without allowing them any recourse to a lawyer or psychiatrist of their own choosing. Previously, there would be a sanity hearing first, and only then a commitment to an asylum or involuntary therapy. But with deprogramming, judges routinely granted parents legal authority over their adult children without a hearing.

Critics contend that deprogramming and exit counseling begin with a false premise. Lawyers for some groups who have lost members due to deprogramming, as well as some civil liberties advocates, sociologists and psychologists, argue that it is not the religious groups but rather the deprogrammers who are the ones who deceive and manipulate people. Cult expert and MA graduate in group dynamics Daniella Mestyanek Young is highly critical of deprogramming and exit counseling, instead focusing on helping people, especially those in cults, deconstruct what they've been taught so they can choose to be more free.

During the 1990s, deprogrammer Rick Ross was sued by Jason Scott, a former member of a Pentecostal group called the Life Tabernacle Church, after an unsuccessful deprogramming attempt. In 1995, the jury awarded Scott US$875,000 in compensatory damages and US$2,500,000 in punitive damages against Ross, which were later settled for US$5,000 and 200 hours of services. More significantly, the jury also found that the leading anti-cult group known as the Cult Awareness Network (CAN) was a co-conspirator in the crime and fined CAN around US$1,000,000 in punitive damages, forcing the group into bankruptcy. This case is often seen as effectively closing the door on the practice of involuntary deprogramming in the United States.

== Referral and kickback system ==
Anti-cult groups play a central role in maintaining the underground network of communications, referrals, transportation, and housing necessary for continued deprogramming.

The Cult Awareness Network operated a referral scheme (NARDEC) in which they would refer people to deprogrammers in return for a "kickback" in the form of a donation or as a commission. Deprogrammers such as Rick Alan Ross, Steven Hassan and Carol Giambalvo were among the CAN-referred deprogrammers.

== Historical examples ==
Year	Subject	Group	Description	Deprogrammer
1974	Kathy Crampton	Love Family	The abduction and deprogramming were televised across the United States; shortly after what was thought to be a successful deprogramming, she reverted. Deprogrammer charged with kidnapping but acquitted.	Ted Patrick
1980	Susan Wirth, a 35-year-old teacher living in San Francisco	Coalition to Fight the Death Penalty; African People's Solidarity Committee; anti-nuclear	Taken off the street and shoved into a van by 4 kidnappers, at the instigation of her parents. The parents paid US$27,000 (roughly $106,000 after inflation) for the deprogramming, which included being gagged, handcuffed to a bed for two weeks, denied food and water, and repeatedly threatened. Despite the ordeal, Wirth remained committed to her causes and spoke out against deprogramming, but declined to press legal charges against her parents.	Ted Patrick
1980	Roberta McElfish, a 26-year-old Tucson waitress.	Wesley Thomas Family	Abducted off the street by relatives who thought she had joined a cult, McElfish managed to escape before a deprogramming was administered. Deprogrammer convicted of conspiracy, kidnapping, and false imprisonment; sentenced to one year in prison and fined US$5,000.	Ted Patrick
1981	Stephanie Riethmiller, who lived in Ohio	lesbian relationship	Kidnapped off the streets by deprogrammers hired by her parents, who paid US$8,000 (approximately $28,000 now) to have her extracted from her lesbian relationship. She was allegedly held against her will for 7 days, harangued constantly about the evils of homosexuality, and repeatedly raped. Authorities brought charges of assault, abduction, and sexual battery against those involved, but the trial resulted largely in acquittals. Civil charges were filed against her parents and the deprogrammers, which were dismissed in a trial that generated some controversy in the media.	Ted Patrick referred parents to Naomi Goss and James Roe
1981	Thomas Ward	Unification Church	Held captive for 35 days and subjected to physical and psychological abuse by deprogrammers and family members. In Ward's civil action, the 4th U.S. Circuit Court of Appeals ruled that federal civil rights laws protect against religious discrimination. The judgment contradicted the (then common) "parental immunity" principle in such cases.	
1982	Claire Château, 21-year-old, in Dijon, France	Unification Church	Kidnapped during the day on the central street of Dijon, Château was pulled into a moving car, screaming for help. Medical-psychological examination showed that she had been in good mental health with no traces of "brainwashing". Seven people—family members and ADFI "professional deprogrammers"—were accused of kidnapping by the Dijon Regional Criminal Investigation Department under §341 of the French criminal code. The case contributed to the gradual abandonment of abductions and deprogramming attempts.	7 people: ADFI and family members
1990	Karen Lever, a 33 years old director of a computer consulting company	Rama Seminars	Seized and shoved into a van by 3 men at Seattle airport. Held captive for 8 days (guarded 24 hours a day with no privacy) by 7 deprogrammers hired by her parents. After the complete failure of their enterprise, the deprogrammers returned Lever to her car at the airport. Advised by Seattle police that she had grounds to press charges for kidnapping and false imprisonment.	Joseph Szimhart
1990	Elma Miller, an Amish woman	liberal sect	Deprogrammers were hired by her husband to return her to him and the Amish church. Criminal charges of conspiracy were filed against the husband, brother, and two others but were later dropped on her request to the prosecuting attorney.	Ted Patrick
1990s	Jason Scott	Pentecostal group called the Life Tabernacle Church (part of United Pentecostal Church International)	Unsuccessful deprogramming. Scott became a former member and sued. The jury awarded Scott US$875,000 in compensatory damages, US$1,000,000 in punitive damages against the Cult Awareness Network (CAN), and US$2,500,000 against Ross (later settled for US$5,000 and 200 hours of services "as an expert consultant and intervention specialist").	Rick Ross

== Exit counseling ==
Proponents of "Exit counseling" distinguish it from coercive forms of deprogramming. The fundamental difference is that involuntary deprogramming involves forced confinement of the individual whereas in exit counseling they are free to leave at any time. The absence of physical coercion is thought to increase the likelihood of establishing a rapport and of not alienating, enraging or terrifying the subject. Exit counsellors are typically brought in during a "family Intervention", where they explain their role and seek to change the subject's attitude to their religious group through reasoning and persuasion.

Langone, writing in 1993, estimated that deprogramming costs typically rise to at least US$10,000 (roughly $22,000 after accounting for inflation), compared to exit counseling which typically costs US$2,000 to US$4,000 (roughly $4,000 to $8,000 after accounting for inflation), although cases requiring extensive research of little-known groups can cost much more. Deprogramming, especially when it fails, also entails considerable legal risk and psychological risk (for example, a permanent alienation of the subject from their family).

In exit counseling, these psychological and legal risks are reduced. Although deprogrammers prepare family members (other than the subject) for the process, exit counselors tend to work with such family members directly, expecting those requesting the intervention to contribute to the process. Exit counseling requires that families establish a reasonable and respectful level of communication with their loved one before the program itself can begin. Because deprogramming relies on coercion (which is illegal except in the case of conservatorship and is generally viewed as unethical) deprogrammers' critiques of the religious organization tend to be less credible to the subject than the arguments of exit counselors.

== See also ==
- Anti-cult movement
- Brainwashing – Methods that purportedly control a person's will, desire, or knowledge
- Conversion therapy – Pseudoscientific attempts to change sexual orientation or gender identity
- Debriefing – Report back and review on a project or mission after completion
- Deradicalization – Process to replace extreme views with moderate ones
- Stockholm syndrome – Contested psychological condition
