= Info-Cult =

Canadian non-profit organization

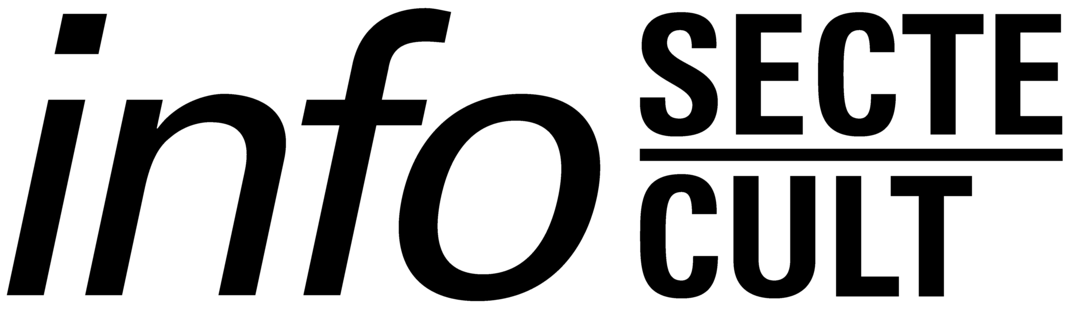
- Predecessor: Cult Information Centre, Cult Project
- Formation: 1980
- Founder: Mike Kropveld
- Founded at: Montreal
- Location: Montreal
- Official language: English, French
- President: Carolle Tremblay
- Executive Director: Mike Kropveld
- Website: www.infosecte.org

Info-Cult, also known as Info-Secte, is a non-profit group that offers information to the Canadian public about religious cults and related topics. From its office in Montreal, it also provides support to people who were victimized as members of a sect.

The group was founded by Mike Kropveld, who is still its Executive Director. In 1977, Kropveld was involved with journalist Josh Freed and others in rescuing a friend who got involved with Sun Myung Moon’s Unification Church. Freed wrote a series of six news reports for the Montreal Star about the intervention, then a book (Moonwebs: Journey into the Mind of a Cult). Director Ralph L. Thomas subsequently made the story into the award-winning film Ticket to Heaven. Faced with the large number of requests for information from the public generated by Freed's work, Kropveld and some friends established the Cult Information Centre. The Centre became the Cult Project under Montreal's B'Nai B'rith Hillel Foundation, then in 1990 it became a standalone group, adopting its current name.

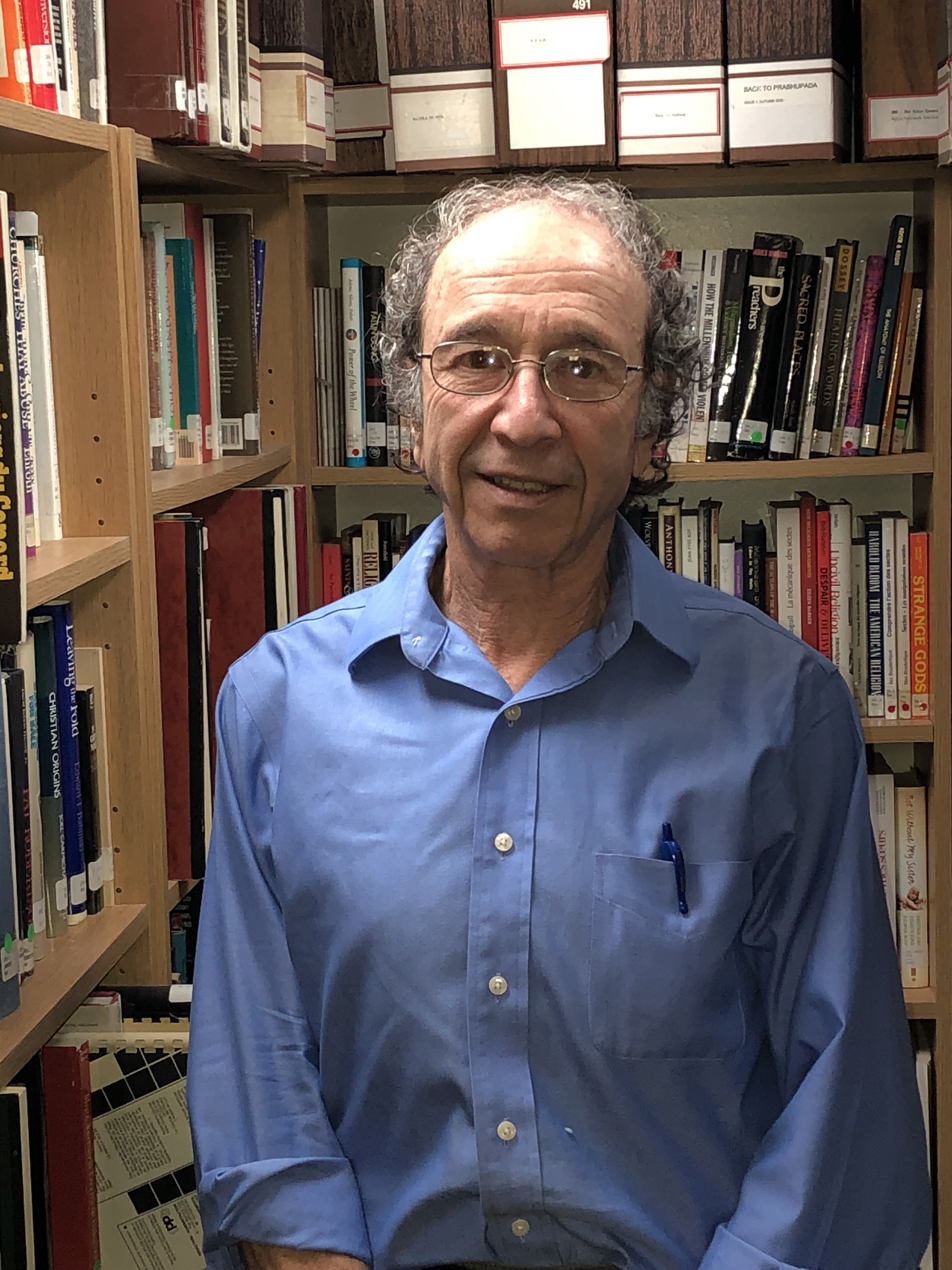
Executive Director Mike Kropveld in the group's office in Montreal, in 2019.

Info-Cult studies marginal religious groups and their leaders. They strive to understand the motivation of people who join a cult, in order to help them when they try to pull away from those controlling influences, or to help people close to them understand what is going on. Some of the 1,000 people who contact Info-Cult each year are worried about family members who are in contact with groups they are not familiar with; others call to get information about conspiracy theories or scams. The group believes sectarian activity has increased significantly since 1980.

They shy away from the concept of "brainwashing" sometimes associated with cults, attributing the power sects have over some in specific periods of their life to socialization and influence. Kropveld insists that public information is the best course of action to prevent cults from harming people and he advises prudence: "Most people have this strong-headedness, but it's really their intellect that they're defending. Cults appeal to your emotions, and the reality is that everyone goes through emotional ordeals, regardless of your intellect."

Info-Cult's Board of Directors is chaired by Carolle Tremblay, a lawyer with expertise in legal issues related to religious groups. The organization is funded by a grant from the provincial government and private donations.

== See also ==
- Cult Information Centre
- Dialogue Ireland
- Decult Conference
- European Federation of Centres of Research and Information on Sectarianism
- International Cultic Studies Association
- MIVILUDES
- The Family Survival Trust
