= Tom Sackville =

British politician (born 1950)

The Honourable Thomas Sackville
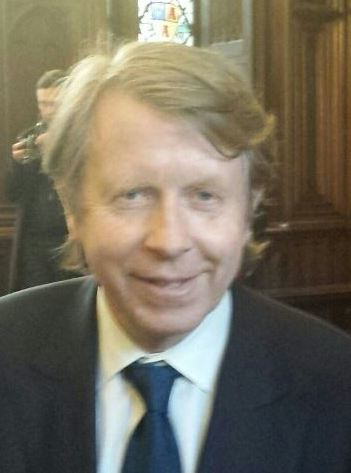

Parliamentary Under-Secretary of State for the Home Department
- In office 28 November 1995 – 1 May 1997
- Prime Minister: John Major
- Preceded by: Nicholas Baker
- Succeeded by: The Lord Williams of Mostyn

Parliamentary Under-Secretary of State for Health and Social Security
- In office 14 April 1992 – 28 November 1995
- Prime Minister: John Major
- Preceded by: new appointment
- Succeeded by: John Horam

Lord Commissioner of the Treasury
- In office 30 October 1989 – 14 April 1992
- Prime Minister: Margaret Thatcher; John Major
- Preceded by: David Heathcoat-Amory
- Succeeded by: Timothy Wood

Member of Parliament for Bolton West
- In office 9 June 1983 – 8 April 1997
- Preceded by: Ann Taylor
- Succeeded by: Ruth Kelly

Personal details
- Born: 26 October 1950 (age 75)
- Parent(s): William Sackville, 10th Earl De La Warr; Anne Rachel Devas

Thomas or Tom Geoffrey Sackville (born 26 October 1950) is a British Conservative politician and anti-cultist.

== Family and early life ==
Sackville is the second son of William Sackville, 10th Earl De La Warr (died February 1988) and Anne Rachel Devas, and his brother is William Herbrand Sackville, the 11th Earl De La Warr.

In 1979, he married Catherine Thérèsa Windsor-Lewis, daughter of Brigadier James Charles Windsor-Lewis. They have two children, both adopted.

He was privately educated at Eton College, and then studied at Lincoln College, Oxford. He began his professional career in merchant banking.

== Parliamentary career ==
Sackville first ran for Parliament in the constituency of Pontypool in the 1979 election, being beaten by Labour's Leo Abse.

He served as a Conservative Member of Parliament for Bolton West from the 1983 election until he was defeated by Ruth Kelly in the 1997 election. He held the office of Parliamentary Under-Secretary of State between 1992 and 1997, initially for the Department of Health, then as a Home Office minister between 1995 and 1997.

== Anti-cult activities ==
In 1985 he started All-Party Committee Against Cults and 20 October 2000 he became first chairman of The Family Survival Trust (formerly Family, Action, Information, Rescue/Resource or FAIR), an anti-cult organisation.

In 1997 he ended government funding for the independent research group Information Network Focus on Religious Movements (INFORM), created by sociologist Eileen Barker. Funds were reinstated in 2000. In his article for The Spectator (2004) he accused INFORM and its president Eileen Barker of "refusing to criticise the worst excesses of cult leaders", and congratulated the Archbishop of Canterbury for declining to become a patron of INFORM. The allegations were described by INFORM as unfounded.

In 2005 he was elected as vice-president of European Federation of Centres of Research and Information on Sectarianism (FECRIS), an umbrella organization for anti-cult groups in Europe, and from 2009 he has served as its president.

Sackville is the current CEO of the International Federation of Health Plans. He is also the current chairman of the trustees of the Family Survival Trust.

== See also ==
- Family Survival Trust
- FECRIS

Parliament of the United Kingdom
Preceded by Ann Taylor	Member of Parliament for Bolton West; 1983 – 1997	Succeeded by Ruth Kelly
