= Cult Information Centre =

Organization

- Founded: 1987; 39 years ago
- Founder: Ian Haworth
- Type: Charitable organisation
- Purpose: Cult education
- Location: London, England

The Cult Information Centre (CIC) is a British anti-cult organisation. The organisation also serves as a resource for information on controversial religious groups, therapy cults, and political cults.

== History ==
The Cult Information Centre was founded in 1987 by Ian Haworth, who had previously been involved with the Council on Mind Abuse, and gained charitable status in the United Kingdom in 1992.

== Reception and criticism ==
William Shaw contacted the Cult Information Centre in his 1993 investigation of cults, and was explicitly critical of its methods and the reliability of its research throughout his book. His opinion was that individuals had joined cults out of "their own hunger to believe" and is dismissive of "absurd scare stories".

In 1999, the BBC reported that the Cult Information Centre was giving talks to sixth-formers. A spokesman for the Jesus Army, one of the groups criticised in the talks, called the Cult Information Centre "unethical" and its views "absolute nonsense". However, the Jesus Army eventually closed after a series of scandals, and was described as "one of the UK's most abusive cults".

A complaint was made in 2010 to the Charity Commission challenging the organisation's charitable status. The single complainant was never identified publicly. The complaint was not upheld and the organisation remains listed and regulated by the Charity Commission.

== See also ==
- Dialogue Ireland
- Decult Conference
- European Federation of Centres of Research and Information on Sectarianism
- Info-Cult
- International Cultic Studies Association
- MIVILUDES
- The Family Survival Trust
