= Anke Richter =

German-born journalist and author based in New Zealand

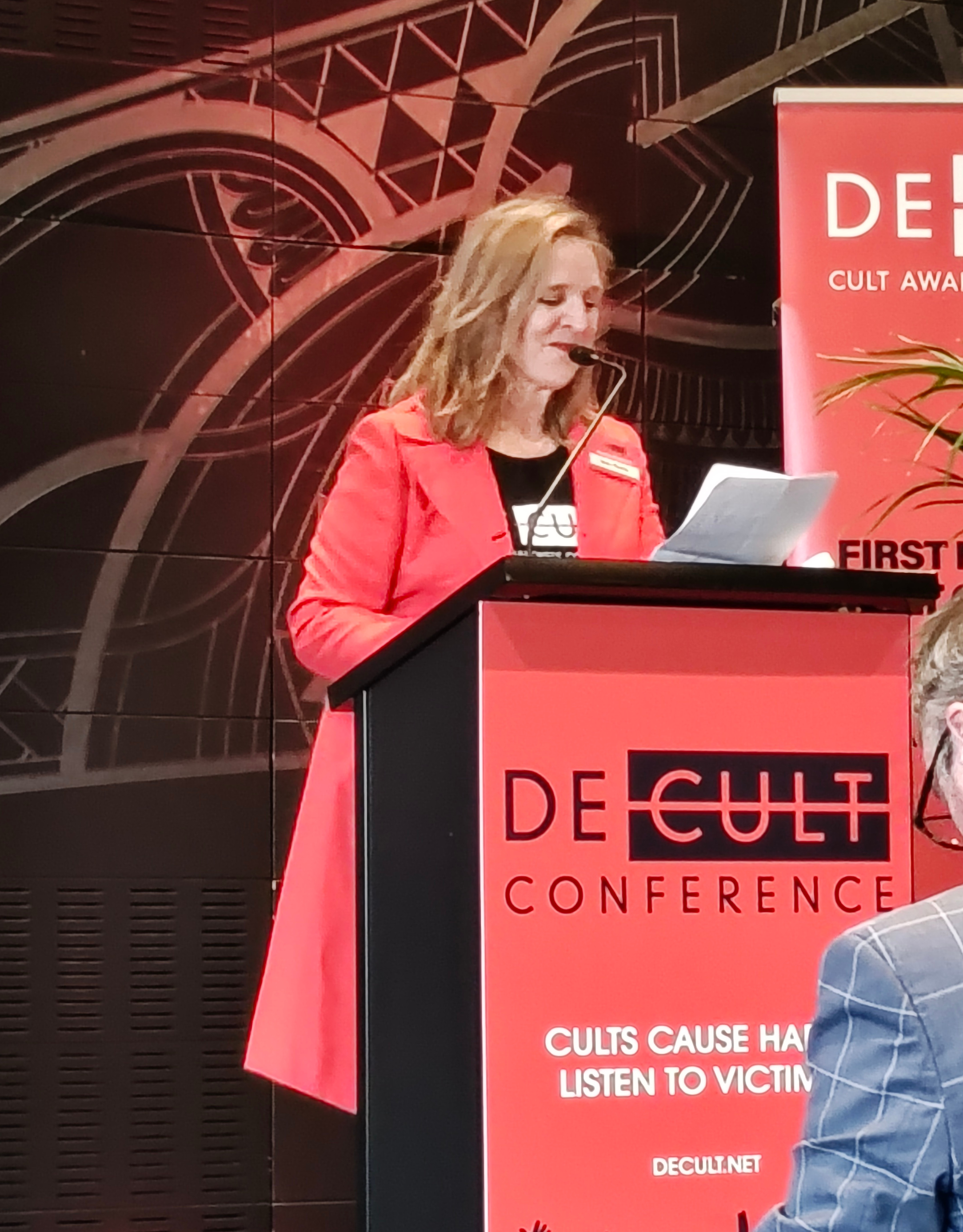
- Richter speaking at the Decult conference in Christchurch (2024)
- Born: 1964 (age 61–62); Germany
- Occupations: Journalist, author
- Notable work: Cult Trip: Inside the World of Coercion & Control
- Website: ankerichter.net

Anke Richter (born 1964) is a German journalist and author based in Lyttelton, near Christchurch, New Zealand. Her work has included foreign correspondence and investigative reporting. Since the 2010s her particular focus has been on cults, coercive control and high-control groups. Her books include Cult Trip: Inside the World of Coercion & Control (2022), and she organised the first Decult Conference in Christchurch in 2024.

== Career ==
In the late 1990s Richter worked as a freelance journalist in Kiel, Germany. She had previously undertaken journalistic training at a correspondent's office in Los Angeles and wrote for the German women's magazine Allegra. Her first book, Aussteigen auf Zeit: Das Sabbatical-Handbuch, was published by vgs in 1999.

Richter later spent seven months on Atafu, one of the three atolls of Tokelau. Her experiences there formed the basis of Tokelau. 200 Tage: Bericht aus einem sinkenden Paradies, published by vgs in 2003.

Richter moved to New Zealand in 2003 and subsequently worked as a freelance journalist and foreign correspondent. Her book Was scheren mich die Schafe: Unter Neuseeländern. Eine Verwandlung was published by Kiepenheuer & Witsch in 2011. The book dealt with her experiences of migration and adapting to life in New Zealand.

As a correspondent, Richter has reported for German-language publications including Die Zeit, Der Spiegel and the Frankfurter Allgemeine Zeitung. Her reporting has included New Zealand current affairs and investigations into yoga, tantra and spiritual communities.

== Reporting on cults and coercive groups ==
Richter began researching cults and high-control groups in the 2010s. Her reporting included investigations into the Agama Yoga school in Thailand and other spiritual and tantric communities.

In 2022, HarperCollins published Richter's Cult Trip: Inside the World of Coercion & Control. The book examines several high-control communities, including Centrepoint, Gloriavale and Agama Yoga.

The book was reviewed by publications including Newtown Review of Books and Newsroom. In 2023, Austrian newspaper Der Standard interviewed Richter about the book and her reporting on coercive groups.

== Decult ==
Richter organised Decult, a cult-awareness conference held at Tūranga in Christchurch on 19 and 20 October 2024. The event was described in advance by The Press as Australasia's first cult-awareness conference.

== Awards and recognition ==
In 2024, New Zealand Skeptics named Richter its Skeptic of the Year, citing her work on cult awareness and the Decult conference.

In 2025, Richter, Sarah Steel and Summer Cooke were co-recipients of the Ethical Media Award in the Freedom Express Awards.

== Bibliography ==
- Aussteigen auf Zeit: Das Sabbatical-Handbuch. vgs, 1999.
- Tokelau. 200 Tage: Bericht aus einem sinkenden Paradies. vgs, 2003.
- Was scheren mich die Schafe: Unter Neuseeländern. Eine Verwandlung. Kiepenheuer & Witsch, 2011.
- Cult Trip: Inside the World of Coercion & Control. HarperCollins, 2022.
