= European Federation of Centres of Research and Information on Sectarianism =

Organization

FECRIS
- Organization logo
- Formation: 1994
- Type: Non-profit International nongovernmental organization
- Purpose: Coordinate organizations monitoring new religious movements
- Headquarters: France
- Region served: Europe
- Members: 54 member organizations in 31 countries (2009)
- Official language: French, English
- President: André Frédéric
- Website: fecris.org

FECRIS (Fédération Européenne des Centres de Recherche et d'Information sur le Sectarisme) – (in French) European Federation of Centres of Research and Information on Sectarianism, a French non-profit association defending victims against cults, serves as an umbrella organization for groups which investigate the activities of groups considered cults in Europe.

== History ==
FECRIS was formed as a French non-profit association, founded in Paris on 30 June 1994 at the request of the French anti-cult group UNADFI (National Union of Associations for the Defence of Family and the Individual), after the 1993 Congress on Sectarianism in Barcelona.

The organization began in 1994 with representation from 10 European countries. The group's first meeting was held in Paris in October 1994. Its second meeting in April 1995 was attended by individuals from six countries. At the meeting, the organization decided to focus on research, and stated "the legal aspects of family/cult relationships should be the first subject for research by an appropriate university or professional department". The first president of FECRIS was Dr. Jacques Richard, succeeded by Friedrich Griess.

At a meeting held in Germany in 1996, the organization recommended perusing recent court decisions for information that could be of use to individuals involved in groups researched by FECRIS. By 1999, FECRIS had established a website, located at www.fecris.org. The organization's president, Jean Nokin, traveled with the vice president to a meeting of the American Family Foundation (now the International Cultic Studies Association) in April 2000, where they presented on the topic of "Cults and the Millennium". By May 2001, FECRIS had 36 member organizations in 24 countries. A June 2001 meeting in Paris dealt with the impact of membership in controversial religious groups, issues of litigation against cults, and safety of youth involved in such groups. The organization held a May 2002 meeting in Barcelona on the topic of "Children and Cults".

As of 2003 the government of France provided funding to the organization.

== Activities ==
FECRIS serves as an umbrella organization for groups tasked with supporting families affected by the cult phenomenon, and investigating the activities of groups they consider cults in Europe. It describes itself as "politically, philosophically and religiously neutral".

It has links with European and international associations and governemental agencies, like AVISO (Belgium), CeSAP (Italy), the Family Survival Trust (England).

Fecris is an advisor to the OSCE Office for Democratic Institutions and Human Rights. In March 2005, the Council of Europe's Standing Committee of the Parliamentary Assembly granted FECRIS advisory status. In 2009, FECRIS was granted "ECOSOC Special Consultative Status" by the United Nations.

== Analysis ==
FECRIS is described in the 2006 book Non-State Actors in the Human Rights Universe as "a transnational network of (state agencies created to deal with the 'cult issue') anti-cult associations". The A to Z of New Religious Movements by George D. Chryssides places FECRIS within the genre of the anti-cult movement.. Paul A. Marshall writes in Religious Freedom in the World that many cult-awareness groups (CAGs) that investigate new religious movements belong to FECRIS. Writing in Multireligiosität im vereinten Europa, Eileen Barker comments that "FECRIS was founded to encompass a number of anti-cult groups." The organization is described in the 2004 book New Religions: A Guide: New Religious Movements, Sects and Alternative Spiritualities: "In France, the principal anti-cult group is UNADFI (National Association for the Defence of the Family International). FECRIS (European Federation of Centres for Research and Sectarianism), founded in 1994, covers Europe more widely, having representatives from ten European countries."

A 2012 special issue of Religion – Staat – Gesellschaft: Zeitschrift für Glaubensformen und Weltanschauungen ("Journal for the Study of Beliefs and Worldviews") was devoted to a critical study of FECRIS; under the heading "Freedom of Religion or Belief: Anti-Sect Movements and State Neutrality". It collected six essays discussing the activities of FECRIS in various countries (in Austria by Christian Brünner, Professor Emeritus for Public Law at the University of Graz; in Germany by Gerhard Besier, historian and a specialist of Jehovah's Witnesses ; in Serbia by Miroslav Jankovic, lawyer in the field of human rights ; in France Patricia Duval, a lawyer specializing in the defense of religious minorities and a member of European Federation For Freedom of Belief (FOB) Scientific Committee). According to scholar Regis Dericquebourg, FECRIS pathologizes and criminalizes members of religious minorities, and falsely assigns "sect" status to religious minorities. The conclusion is by Willy Fautré, founder and director of Human Rights Without Frontiers International.

== Notable representatives ==
- André Frédéric – President of FECRIS since 2022
- Marie Drilhon – Vice-President of FECRIS since 2025
- Luigi Corvaglia - Member of the Administrative Board (since 2016) and of the Scientific Committee (since 2015)
- Janja Lalich - Member of the Scientific Committee since 2015

== See also ==
- Cult Information Centre
- Dialogue Ireland
- Decult Conference
- Info-Cult
- International Cultic Studies Association
- MIVILUDES
- The Family Survival Trust
