= People's Organised Workshop on Ersatz Religion =

British deprogramming organisation

The People's Organised Workshop on Ersatz Religion (POWER), also called the People's Organised Workgroup on Ersatz Religion, was a British anti-cult organisation founded in 1976 based in Ealing, London. Some believe that POWER is a front organisation by large new religious movements (NRMs) meant to delegitimise other anti-cult organisations like Family, Action, Information, Rescue (FAIR). POWER functionally disappeared in 1977 but caused major controversy within its roughly one-year lifespan. The organisation published a brochure called Deprogramming: The Constructive Destruction of Belief: A Manual of Technique, which advocated for mass deprogramming of cult members, including methods like sleep deprivation, food deprivation, forced nudity, kidnapping, and "aggressive sex".

The exact party that founded POWER and their intentions are unknown. A 1977 Times (London) article attributed Michael "Mike" Heys (born c. 1952) as the founder of the organisation. Elisabeth Arweck and James A. Beckford seemingly agree that a single person founded POWER, but they both are unsure of the person's intentions. The Acton Gazette and Post reported in June 1976 that Heys works with "a couple of part-time helpers" to run POWER. Times journalist Michael Horsnell writes that Heys reportedly began deprogramming because a girlfriend joined the Children of God. Heys was an unemployed lorry driver from Ealing, London, according to The Sunday People (London). In Beckford's book, he noted that some argued that Federal Bureau of Investigation documents, obtained via the American Freedom of Information Act, prove that POWER was actually run by "one of the largest NRMs", but he dismisses the evidence as inconclusive. Heys reportedly told the Gazette and Post (Acton, London) that "[c]ults must be destroyed now, not at some vague date in the future".

In their book Les Nouveaux Prophètes, Jean-Marie Leduc and Didier de Plaige argue that POWER was a front organisation to discredit other anti-cult organisations. Leduc and de Plaige claim that Deprogramming: The Constructive Destruction of Belief was circulated in France by the Church of Scientology after being obtained through a secret conference of deprogrammers in 1977.

By the end of 1977, Heys and POWER disappeared from public view. Arweck and Beckford argue that POWER's incessance on deprogramming tarnished FAIR's public image along with other anti-cult groups.

== See also ==
- Anti-cult movement
- Deprogramming
- The Family Survival Trust (formerly FAIR)
