= Cultists Anonymous =

British anti-cult organization

Cultists Anonymous (CA) was a British anti-cult organization made up of ex-cultists from Family, Action, Information, and Rescue (FAIR), Britain's largest anti-cult organization. CA formed in 1985 but rejoined FAIR in 1991. CA's leaders generally remained anonymous to avoid intimidation from new religious movements (NRMs). However, George D. Chryssides, a British religious studies scholar, believes that Lord John Francis Rodney, 9th Baron Rodney (Lord Rodney) was the leader of the group.

== Split from FAIR ==
CA split from FAIR at the latest in August 1985. Since at least 1984, some members of FAIR believed that it was becoming "moderate" and it needed a stronger stance against "cults." In FAIR's 1985 annual general meeting, co-chair Casey McCann reaffirmed FAIR's stance against deprogramming, believing that it was damaging and telescopic on brainwashing. As such, some FAIR members formed CA to satisfy some FAIR members who wanted more deprogramming and "hardliner" stances against NRMs. McCann wrote in the Journal of Contemporary Religion (then Religion Today) that many of CA's founding members were parents of followers of the Rajneesh movement.

== Anti-cult activities ==
CA's primary anti-cult activity was hosting a 24-hour hotline telephone service for NRM members, their family members, and ex-NRM members. It was launched in August 1985. They were staffed by an anonymous team of women calling themselves "Mandy" or "Janet." There were at least six members of the staff team at any one time, and they usually connected callers to other resources and "experts." Sometimes these referrals included deprogrammers and organizations that support deprogramming like the Council on Mind Abuse (COMA).

Occasionally, CA hosted protests of NRM meetings and ecumenical activities that included NRMs. For example, in December 1985, Scientologists and Unificationists joined a multi-denominational committee to protect the freedom of religion in Britain in response to the growth of anti-cultism. CA members were barred entry from the venue.

== Collapse and rejoining FAIR ==
In 1991, CA's hotline ran out of funding and could no longer operate. FAIR agreed to take over the hotline. FAIR invited CA members back to rejoin their group. Scholar Elisabeth Arweck believes that few CA members rejoined FAIR; however, Chryssides argues that since Lord Rodney became chairman of FAIR in 1988 showed how much overlap between the two groups' members there was. McCann believed that the membership of overlap was nearly exact. In his book Exploring New Religions, Chryssides adds that Cyril Vosper, at the time FAIR's treasurer, received a prison sentence in 1987 for his role in his daughter's deprogramming, implying that there were strong deprogramming sentiments in FAIR as well as CA. The exact number of CA members to rejoin FAIR is unknown.

== See also ==
- Anti-cult movement
- The Family Survival Trust
- Casey McCann
