= INFORM =

Organization

INFORM (Information Network Focus on Religious Movements)
- Formation: 1988
- Founder: Prof. Eileen Barker
- Type: Non-profit charity
- Headquarters: Department of Theology & Religious Studies, King's College London, United Kingdom
- Members: religious, secular
- Honorary Director: Suzanne Newcombe
- Chair of the Board of Governors: Dr. Susannah Crockford
- Treasurer: Dr Edward Graham-Hyde
- Chair of the Management Committee: Dr. Aled Thomas
- Website: http://www.inform.ac

INFORM (Information Network Focus on Religious Movements) is an independent registered charity located in the Department of Theology and Religious Studies at King's College, London; from 1988-2018 it was based at the London School of Economics. It was founded by the sociologist of religion, Eileen Barker, with start-up funding from the British Home Office and Britain's mainstream churches. Its stated aims are to "prevent harm based on misinformation about minority religions and sects by bringing the insights and methods of academic research into the public domain" and to provide "information about minority religions and sects which is as accurate, up-to-date and as evidence-based as possible."

== History ==
The founding of INFORM was motivated by a shared impression among clergy and academics that groups hostile to cults often aimed to feed rather than alleviate enquirers' fears. During the 1980s, the British Home Office received many complaints related to cults and NRMs from concerned parents, but did not feel that any of the existing counter-cult and anti-cult groups deserved state funding. Answering the need for a body that would disseminate well-researched, impartial, and easily understood information, Eileen Barker, a leading sociologist of religion based at the London School of Economics and Political Science, established INFORM in 1988 with the support of the Home Office, the Archbishop of Canterbury, Cardinal Hume and other mainstream churches. Eileen Barker argued that the media have an interest in attracting and keeping readers, most of whom are likely to be attracted by sensational stories. Suppliers of information may well have an agenda that leads them to adjust their product to meet a perceived demand.

Its founding aim was to provide neutral, objective and up-to-date information on new religious movements (NRMs) to government officials, scholars, the media, and members of the general public, in particular to relatives of people who have joined a new religious movement, as well as religious or spiritual seekers. Founder Eileen Barker retired from directing Inform in 2020 and from its Board of Governors in 2022 (although she is still active as an Observer).

== Activities ==
INFORM, based in the Department of Theology and Religious Studies at King's College London, researches and collects information on new religious movements and makes this data available to all interested parties – government officials, researchers and the media as well as relatives of people who have joined a new religious movement. Seeking to dispel the often inaccurate and distorted information disseminated about new religious movements in the media, INFORM aims to provide reliable information, based on in-depth research, about the character, policy and origins of new religious movements, as well as information about what motivates converts, and how movement membership tends to affect members' subsequent lives and careers. INFORM does not itself perform counselling, but refers enquirers to a nationwide network of qualified experts. Where parents have lost all contact with their son or daughter, INFORM may be able to put them in touch with a go-between who has established lines of communication to the movement. In some instances, INFORM has arranged meetings between families and founders or officials of new religious movements.

Since 1988 INFORM has been holding regular seminars about thematic topics and new and minority religions, and recent seminars have been conducted online and recordings are available.

INFORM maintains a database and historical archives which it draws upon to provide information for enquirers and researchers. It has produced summary information about some individual groups and traditions on its website. More recently INFORM staff and affiliates have provided Factsheets for the Religion Media Centre and the Critical Dictionary of Apocalyptic and Millennial Movements (CDAMM). INFORM publishes a book series with Rougledge on Minority Religions and Spiritual Movements which "addresses themes related to new religions, many of which have been the topics of Inform seminars. The series editorial board consists of internationally renowned scholars in the field."

INFORM was a partner in the AHRC-funded Abuse in Religious Contexts and in a Culham St Gabriel's-funded project exploring the teaching of Religion and Worldviews in English schools. From March 2025-November 2027, it is a key partner on a grant from the John Templeton Foundation (#63357) entitled New Religiosity and the Digital Study of Eudaimonia hosted by the Open University, in collaboration with the Database of Religious History (DBH), based at the University of British Columbia.

== Reception ==
In a book of essays in tribute of Eileen Barker, Bryan R. Wilson, a leading scholar of religion from Oxford University, stated that INFORM has often managed to resolve or defuse the deeply emotional conflicts surrounding membership in a new religious movement.

INFORM has been criticised by anti-cult organisations, in particular the Family Action Information Resource (FAIR) chaired by former Conservative Home Office minister and anti-cult campaigner Tom Sackville, who cut INFORM's Home Office funding in 1997. In 1999, it was reported that INFORM was facing closure, due to lack of funds.

By 2000, Home Office funding was restored, prompting Sackville to warn that INFORM might provide government with bad advice, adding, "I cancelled INFORM's grant and I think it's absurd that it's been brought back." Criticism of INFORM has focused on Barker's reluctance to condemn all new religions as "cults". Barker responded to the criticism by saying, "We are not cult apologists. People make a lot of noise without doing serious research – so much so that they can end up sounding as closed to reason as the cults they're attacking. Besides, I imagine FAIR was disappointed not to get our funding."

During 2021 a letter to The Lancet cited research from Inform-associated authors, suggesting that the sociological approach to studying "cults" which emphasises "inquisitive dialogue and contextual understanding" might be usefully applied to the anti-vax movement.

== Funding ==
INFORM has a policy of not accepting money from any of the new religious movements or any other organisation that might wish to prejudice the outcome of its research. INFORM has received funding, project grants and assistance in kind from different branches of the British government including the Home Office; Department for Education, Department of Communities and Local Government/Department for Levelling Up, Housing and Communities, European Research Council, the Church of England, the Catholic Church, the Methodist Church; and trusts and foundations including the Centre for the Critical Study of Apocalyptic and Millenarian Movements (CenSAMM), Culham St. Gabriel's, the Spaulding Trust, J.P.Getty, Nuffield, Wates, and the Jerusalem Trust, amongst others. Affiliated researchers have been funded by the Arts and Humanities Research Council, British Academy, Leverhulme, and the Department of Health. In addition, INFORM receives some donations from enquirers.

== Articles ==
- "Cults need vigilance, not alarmism", article in the Church Times, 2008-06-20, by James A. Beckford, Emeritus Professor of Sociology at the University of Warwick and chairman of INFORM's management committee
- Eileen Barker (2006) "What should we do about the Cults? Policies, Information and the Perspective of INFORM." pp. 371–95 in The New Religious Question: State Regulation or State Interference? (La nouvelle question religieuse: Régulation ou ingérence de l'État?), edited by Pauline Côté and T. Jeremy Gunn. Brussels: Peter Lang.
- Eileen Barker (2001) "INFORM : Bringing the Sociology of Religion to the Public Space." In P. Côté (Ed.), Chercheurs de dieux dans l’espace public - Frontier Religions in Public Space (pp. 21–34). University of Ottawa Press.

== Inform Associated Books ==
- Eileen Barker (1989) New Religious Movements: A Practical Introduction. London: HMSO.
- Jean La Fontaine (1998) Speak of the Devil: Tales of Satanic Abuse in Contemporary England. Cambridge University Press.
- Jean La Fontaine (2009) The Devil's Children: From Spirit Possession to Witchcraft: New Allegations that Affect Children. Routledge.
- Routledge-Inform Book Series (Ashgate 2013-2018, Routledge 2018-2025)
- 'Religion at the Boundaries' Bloomsbury-Inform Book Series (2024-)
