= Casey McCann =

Anti-cult activist (c. 1943–2000)

Michael Thomas M. Casey McCann (c. 1943–2000), commonly known as Casey McCann or M. T. M. Casey McCann, was an anti-cult activist in Britain, Sevenoaks School school master in Kent, and headmaster of St. Paul's British School in São Paulo, Brazil. He is well-known for his co-leadership in Family, Action, Information, Rescue (FAIR) in the 1980s with Lady Daphne Vane.

In 1943, McCann was born in Wexford, Ireland. His mother was Irish Catholic and his father was a British Anglican. He studied economics at Trinity College Dublin. In 1965, he moved to London to conduct research, and lived there for at least 20 years. He taught and worked as a master and house tutor at Sevenoaks School, a predominantly boys public school, from 1965 up until about 1991. In 1991, McCann gave a tour to Prince Charles and Princess Diana of Wales of the Sevenoaks School. Soon after, McCann accepted a position at St. Paul's British School in São Paulo, Brazil. On 28 February 2000, a maid discovered McCann dead in his apartment in São Paulo; he was likely murdered after a sexual encounter with a man of unknown identity.

== Family, Action, Information, Rescue (FAIR) and anti-cult activity ==
McCann first became involved with anti-cultism in 1980 when two students joined the Unification Church in San Francisco, California, while on summer holiday. While seeking advice from the Foreign Office about how to get the students home, McCann was connected with FAIR. He and Peter Hullah, Sevenoaks School's chaplain, flew to San Francisco and demanded to speak to the two students, which they were eventually allowed to do. One would return to England to resume his university education, but the other stayed with the Unification Church in the United States.

In November 1981, McCann created a list of British academics who wished to attend a scientific conference in Seoul, South Korea, called the Tenth International Conference for the Unity of the Sciences. The names became public in an early day motion—for which Conservative MP for Gravesend Timothy Brinton motioned—in the House of Commons. Those listed included Professors R. V. Jones, Antony Flew, J. W. Pringle, and Sir Hans Krebs. Professor Jones, in a letter to The Times's editor, wrote that he was erroneously put on the list since he refused the last three invitations he received from the International Cultural Foundation, an organization founded by Sun Myung Moon that organized the conferences. Others, like Professors Flew and Kenneth Mellanby, attended the conference and discussed the issue of the Unification Church brainwashing British students and sending them to the United States, which the professors believed was not an issue anymore since the American branch of the Unification Church took measures to allow or encourage British students to return to Britain to continue their education and see family.

Throughout 1981–2, McCann headed a public campaign for academics to pressure the Unification Church to return students who interrupted their post-secondary educations to join the Church in the United States. McCann believed that approximately 50 students interrupted their studies to convert and a further 450 Britons were in the United States because of their conversion to the Unification Church.

McCann supported the measures detailed in the Cottrell Report, a report from the European Parliament's Committee on Youth, Culture, Education, Information and Sport with MEP for Bristol Richard Cottrell as rapporteur, released as a working document on 2 April 1984. One of the recommendations of the Cottrell Report was requiring new religious movements to report the whereabouts or address of individual members, which some have criticized as infringing on religious freedoms. McCann, however, believed that these proposals were voluntarily on behalf of the new religious movements and were not intended to be legislative.

By 1980 McCann was a member of FAIR. According to Elisabeth Arweck, he also served as FAIR's treasurer. In late 1984, McCann shared FAIR's chairmanship with Lady Daphne Vane, a French woman and an MP. In his article in Journal of Contemporary Religion (formerly Religion Today), it states that he was a "FAIR committee" member in mid-1986.

== Death ==
On 28 February 2000, a maid named Dirce de Olieveira discovered McCann's body in his apartment in São Paulo, Brazil. According to The Times, his death occurred on 26 February 2000. Olieveira found him bound at the hands and feet on his bed, and he was dressed only in his underwear. São Paulo police investigated the death as a murder case. Neighbors and a coffee shop owner identified a man with whom McCann had sexual encounters as a potential suspect; however, this suspect was never identified and the case is unsolved.

== See also ==
- List of unsolved murders (2000–present)
