= The Making of a Moonie =

1984 book by Eileen Barker

- The Making of a Moonie
- Author: Eileen Barker
- Language: English
- Subject: religious conversion
- Genre: Unification Church
- Publisher: Blackwell Publishers
- Publication date: November 1984
- Publication place: United Kingdom
- ISBN: 0-631-13246-5
- OCLC: 10923532
- Dewey Decimal: 289.9 19
- LC Class: BX9750.S4 B37 1984

The Making of a Moonie: Choice or Brainwashing? is a 1984 book written by British sociologist Eileen Barker. The book describes the religious conversion process to the Unification Church, whose members are sometimes informally referred to as "Moonies".

Barker spent close to seven years studying Unification Church members. She interviewed in depth and/or gave probing questionnaires to Unification Church members, ex-members, "non-joiners," and control groups of uninvolved individuals from similar backgrounds, as well as parents, spouses, and friends of members. She also attended numerous Unification Church workshops and communal facilities.

Barker writes that she rejects the "brainwashing" theory as an explanation for conversion to the Unification Church, because, as she wrote, it explains neither the many people who attended a Unification Church recruitment meeting and did not become members, nor the voluntary disaffiliation of members. Reviewers have quoted her conclusions: "I have not been persuaded that they are brainwashed zombies," and "Moonies are no more likely to stagnate into mindless robots than are their peers who travel to the city on the 8.23 each morning."

In 2006 Laurence Iannaccone of George Mason University, a specialist in the economics of religion, wrote that The Making of a Moonie was "one of the most comprehensive and influential studies" of the process of conversion to new religious movements. Australian psychologist Len Oakes and British psychiatry professor Anthony Storr, who have written rather critically about cults, gurus, new religious movements and their leaders, have praised The Making of a Moonie. It was given the Distinguished Book Award for 1985 by the Society for the Scientific Study of Religion.
