= International Cultic Studies Association =

Anti-cult organization

- Formation: 1979; 47 years ago
- Founder: Kay Barney
- Headquarters: Savannah, Georgia, United States
- Executive Director: Jacqueline Johnson, DSW
- President: Debby Schriver
- Website: internationalculticstudies.org

The International Cultic Studies Association (ICSA), formerly the American Family Foundation (AFF), is a non-profit educational and anti-cult organization. It publishes the International Journal of Coercion, Abuse, and Manipulation, ICSA Today, and other materials.

== History ==
The American Family Foundation (AFF) was founded by Kay Barney in 1979 in Lexington, Massachusetts. It was one of a few anti-cult groups founded in this period, and one of several dozen disparate parents' groups founded in the late 1970s by concerned parents. Barney's daughter had joined the Unification Church, and he came to see her relationship with it as alarming and controlling; he sought to learn more and therefore counteract its influence. The American Family Foundation was conservative in orientation.

For a time the AFF was affiliated with the Citizens’ Freedom Foundation (CFF) which later became the Cult Awareness Network (CAN). They were the two biggest anti-cult organizations in the United States. However, unlike CAN, the AFF largely did not engage with freelance deprogrammers, whose acts were often illegal. Instead the AFF mostly engaged with psychologists and other professionals concerned by cults. For its first few years, it focused largely on trying to convince various levels of governments to take up legal action against cult groups; after several years of failure, they abandoned this route and decided to instead focus on education by 1984. It functioned as the "academic arm" of the anti-cult movement.

They promoted the idea of satanic groups connected to "satanic ritual abuse" as part of the Satanic panic. They had a "Task Force on Satanism", and sold a "Satanism information packet" that checked for a "ritual abuse behavioral checklist" and included miscellaneous news clips on allegedly satanic crimes. Their periodicals also ran articles on the topic, and editors of their periodicals expressed a belief in ritual abuse. Believers in Satanic ritual abuse referred to the AFF to help survivors of the alleged practice. At this time they were also connected to the False Memory Syndrome Foundation.

They have historically given out the John G. Clark Award for Distinguished Scholarship in Cultic Studies. They had the "Center of Destructive Cultism" as an arm of the main organization. In 1999, its executive director was Michael Langone. It also developed links with Christian counter-cult movements such as the Christian Research Institute. In December 2004, it changed its name from the American Family Foundation to International Cultic Studies Association, to reflect a more international orientation. Different cult monitoring organizations coordinate through the ICSA. They host conferences, including an annual international meeting.

The ICSA is the only significant North American anti-cult organization to survive into the twenty-first century.

== Publications ==
The AFF/ICSA has published a variety of periodicals throughout its existence. The American Family Foundation's first magazine was The Advisor, launched in 1979. From 1982 to 1983 they also had the Cultic Studies Newsletter. In 1984 they were replaced by The Cult Observer and the Cultic Studies Journal. The editor of the Cultic Studies Journal was for a time Michael Langone. They also published AFF News.

In 2001, publication of the Cultic Studies Journal and The Cult Observer ceased, and the AFF began publishing the Cultic Studies Review as an online journal with triennial print editions. In 2005, the final AFF published edition of Cultic Studies Review was released. Subsequent editions were published by the International Cultic Studies Association until 2010. They have published the ICSA Today magazine since 2010.

In 2010, the first print and online editions of the International Journal of Cultic Studies were published. The journal ceased in 2019. In 2020, they launched the International Journal of Coercion, Abuse, and Manipulation.

== Reception ==
The former AFF's participation in the hysteria over Satanism has been criticized. Writer Debbie Nathan called the American Family Foundation a "conservative group that distrusts nonmainstream religions", and criticized their accusations that such groups broke up "traditional families" and their belief in Satanic ritual abuse. In 1994, Linda Blood, a writer who had coauthored an AFF book with Langone, published The New Satanists, a book that promoted Satanic panic allegations. It was reviewed positively in the organization's Cultic Studies Journal. James T. Richardson wrote that the AFF were one of several anti-cult groups at this time to "mix their usual message about brainwashing and mind control in religious cults with a heavy dose of atrocity tales and myths about satanism".

Scholars George D. Chryssides and Benjamin E. Zeller wrote that while material from its earlier journals and material under the AFF had been sometimes criticized, its material from the International Journal of Cultic Studies was better regarded and included contributions from well-known academics. Bryan Edelman and James T. Richardson state that China has borrowed heavily from Western anti-cult movements, such as ICSA, to bolster their view of non-mainstream religious groups, and so the support campaigns of oppression against them. In a previous article Richardson and Marat S. Shterin said that Western anti-cult organizations, including the CSA, had been a source of anti-cult material in Russia.

In their book Cults and New Religions: A Brief History, sociologists Douglas E. Cowan and David G. Bromley describe the ICSA as a "secular anticult" organization. They claim that the ICSA provides no indication of how many of its cult characteristics are necessary for a group to be considered "cultic," and that the checklist creators do not adequately define how much of certain practices or behaviors would constitute "excessive," nor do they provide evidence that any of the practices listed are innately harmful. Cowan and Bromley also state that the ICSA’s list is so broad that even mainstream religious movements such as Buddhism, Evangelical Protestantism, Hinduism, and the Roman Catholic Church could fall within the criteria. Cowan has also described what he has identified as ICSA's tendency to label those who have criticized their methodology, including himself, as "cult apologists" who are "either ignorant of the issue or part of the problem."

== See also ==
- Cult Information Centre
- Dialogue Ireland
- Decult Conference
- European Federation of Centres of Research and Information on Sectarianism
- Info-Cult
- MIVILUDES
- The Family Survival Trust
