= Ian Haworth =

English anti-cultist

Ian Haworth (born c. 1947) is an English anti-cultist. Originally from Lancashire, England, he moved to and lived in Toronto, Canada, in the late 1970s and early-to-mid 1980s. He returned to England in 1987 and founded the Cult Information Centre, an anti-cult organization. He also founded the Council on Mind Abuse (COMA)^{α} in 1979 in Toronto. Haworth has acted as a consultant for two Multi-level marketing companies and found them to not be abusive of their members.

== Council on Mind Abuse (COMA) ==
Haworth and others founded COMA after his interactions with a group he labels a "cult." Haworth in the 1970s joined a group, the PSI Mind Development Institute, in Toronto in order to quit smoking. He claimed he was hypnotized at least 16 times in the four-day course that he attended. According to The People, Haworth was only a member of PSI for only three weeks, and he realized that PSI was a cult after reading a Canadian newspaper article about the group. Upon finding others with similar experiences, they founded COMA.

In addition to cults and new religious movements, COMA was active in the North American satanism scare of the 1980s and 1990s.

COMA's activities primarily were answer phone calls of distressed relatives and loved ones of people who joined new religious movements and left home. In addition, COMA hosted presentations and were consulted by police, courts, social organizations, journalists, etc. Haworth told the Toronto Star that at its founding, COMA received about 50–80 calls or letters asking for information about new religious movements, and COMA gave about 1,000 presentations throughout Ontario about cults. In 1992, COMA's then director, psychologist Robert Tucker, told the Toronto Star that they receive about 100–150 calls per week.

COMA, under Haworth, operated out of a secret location, so there was no office or facility in which people could receive help.

Almost immediately after its founding, various groups attacked COMA in order to discredit it. For example, in 1980, a false newsletter was circulated around Ottawa ostensibly written by COMA staff. Dr. B. W. Shaw, a COMA spokesperson, told The Canadian Champion that it was likely written by "cult organizations," specifically to discredit COMA as a trustworthy organization.

In 1987, Haworth left COMA and Canada to form the Cult Information Centre in London. Robert Tucker took over as director in July 1987. Tucker moved COMA to a different office in Toronto in August 1989, and its location was publicized. Tucker attempted to increase the funding COMA received in donations, service and consulting fees, and presentations in 1991; he told the Toronto Star in June 1991 that without an extra 20,000 CAD in revenue, COMA would have to close in September 1991.

In 1992, COMA went bankrupt due to two new religious movements, the Church of Scientology and Erhard Seminars Training (EST), suing for libel in suits that spanned about five years. However, Tucker believes there were other causes to its closure as well. He writes in the Toronto Star that government inaction and hesitancy of donors contributed to its bankruptcy as well. COMA officially closed on 1 March 1992.

== Cult Information Centre (CIC) ==
Upon arriving in Britain in 1987, Haworth founded the Cult Information Centre. Like COMA, Haworth made the office location and identities of the trustees a secret to avoid harassment from new religious movements. CIC works extensively with educational institutions, union organizations, and other organizations to disseminate information about new religious movements to students, whom Haworth believes are particularly vulnerable to brainwashing techniques.

CIC registered as a charity (No. 1012914) through the Charity Commission for England and Wales in 1992, which has maintained up to the present. However, the Charity Commission has questioned its charitable status due to the complaints of new religious movements, some of which also have charitable status. CIC claims to be the first organization with charity status to research new religious movements and expose their "harmful methods."

== Litigation Issues ==
In 1982, Haworth made some remarks about Erhard Seminars Training at the University of Guelph, which were published in a local newspaper. A libel action was heard against him in his absence in a Canadian court in 1989, after he returned to Britain in 1987. In 1990, Haworth was informed of the libel action with a damages award of 5,000 GBP against him with 14% interest. The Canadian court awarded Werner Erhard & Associates International, which is a corporatized form of EST—10,000 CAD plus costs at Haworth, an associate (Robert Sutherland), and the local newspaper's expense. Werner Erhard & Associates, which have offices in London, brought the case to the High Court where they were awarded 20,423 GBP in damages at Haworth's expense. Haworth filed for bankruptcy in April 1996, which did not infringe on his anti-cult work. The local newspaper's case was dropped after it published a statement written by EST, and Sutherland's case was dropped after making an apology and paying 100 GBP. Allegedly, Haworth—having learned of the libel action against him—fled to Britain in 1987 in order to avoid paying damages. However, no legal action was ever taken against him for this allegation.

== Notes ==
^αThere is another anti-cult organization in the United States and the United Kingdom named COMA and should not be confused with this Canadian one.

== See also ==
- Anti-cult movement
- Cult Information Centre
