= Eileen Barker =

British professor of sociology (born 1938)

Eileen Barker OBE FBA
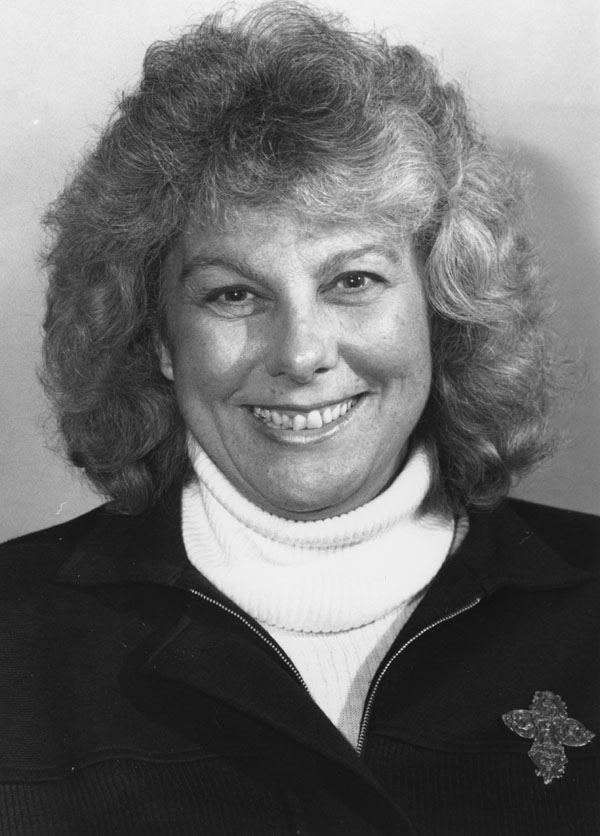
- Eileen Barker, 1990s
- Born: Eileen Vartan Barker; 21 April 1938 (age 88); Edinburgh, Scotland
- Occupation: Professor of sociology
- Known for: Study of cults and new religious movements, religion
- Political party: Liberal Democrats
- Board member of: INFORM, Society for the Scientific Study of Religion, Association for the Sociology of Religion, International Journal of Cultic Studies

Eileen Vartan Barker (born 21 April 1938, in Edinburgh, UK) is a professor in sociology, an emeritus member of the London School of Economics (LSE), and a consultant to that institution's Centre for the Study of Human Rights. She is the chairperson and founder of the Information Network Focus on Religious Movements (INFORM) and has written studies about cults and new religious movements.

== Academic career ==
Barker has been involved with the LSE's sociology department, where she received her PhD, since 1970.

In 1988, she engaged in research on the preservation of cultural identity in the Armenian diaspora. In the same year, she founded the Information Network Focus on Religious Movements (INFORM) with the support of the Archbishop of Canterbury and financial help from the British Home Office.

Barker has held numerous positions of leadership in the academic study of religion. She served as the chairperson of the British Sociological Association's Study Group for the Sociology of Religion from 1985 to 1990, as president of the Society for the Scientific Study of Religion from 1991 to 1993 (the first non-American to hold that office), and as president of the Association for the Sociology of Religion from 2001 to 2002.

In 2000, Barker became an Officer of the Order of the British Empire (OBE) and the American Academy of Religion awarded her its Martin E. Marty Award for Contributions to the Public Understanding of Religion.

Barker was a member of the editorial review board of Cultic Studies Review, an academic journal that offered peer-reviewed scholarship alongside news concerning cults and new religious movements. Barker subsequently joined the editorial board of the International Journal of Cultic Studies, which superseded Cultic Studies Review in 2010.

== The Making of a Moonie ==
Her 1984 book The Making of a Moonie: Choice or Brainwashing? is based on close to seven years of study of Unification Church members (informally called "Moonies") in the United Kingdom and the United States. Laurence Iannaccone of George Mason University, a specialist in the economics of religion, wrote that The Making of a Moonie was "one of the most comprehensive and influential studies" of the process of conversion to new religious movements.

== Analysis ==
=== Brainwashing ===
Brainwashing proponents Margaret Singer and Janja Lalich have criticised Barker's rejection of the brainwashing hypothesis in her study of the conversion process for members of the Unification Church. Singer and Lalich, in their 1995 book Cults in Our Midst, called Barker a "procult apologist" for adopting an "apologist stance" towards the Unification Church, and noted that she had received payment from the Church for expenses for a book and eighteen conferences from the Unification Church. Barker defended this by stating that it had been approved by her university and a government grants council, and saved taxpayer money. Australian psychologist Len Oakes and British psychiatry professor Anthony Storr, who have written critically about cults, gurus, new religious movements, and their leaders, have praised Barker's work on the Unification Church's conversion process.

Barker responded to the financial issues in a 1995 paper, writing that "[w]hat is less well known is that vast amounts of money are at stake in the fostering of brainwashing and mind control thesis in the anti-cult movement secondary constructions", and noting that "deprogrammers" and "exit counselors" charge tens of thousands of dollars for their services and that "expert witnesses" such as Singer "have charged enormous fees for giving testimony about brainwashing in court cases".

=== INFORM ===
Barker's INFORM organisation was criticised in 2000 by the Family Action Information Resource, chaired by former Conservative Home Office minister and anti-cult campaigner Tom Sackville, who cut INFORM's Home Office funding in 1997. In 1999, it was reported that INFORM was facing closure, due to lack of funds. By 2000, Home Office funding was restored, prompting Sackville to warn that INFORM might provide government with bad advice, adding, "I cancelled INFORM's grant and I think it's absurd that it's been brought back". Criticism of INFORM has focused on Barker's reluctance to condemn all new religions as "cults". Barker responded to the criticism by saying, "We are not cult apologists. People make a lot of noise without doing serious research – so much so that they can end up sounding as closed to reason as the cults they're attacking. Besides, I imagine FAIR was disappointed not to get our funding".

In a 2003 collection of essays in honour of Barker, the influential Oxford University-based religious scholar Bryan R. Wilson commented that INFORM was "often in a position from which it can reassure relatives about the character, disposition, policy, provenance and prospects of a given movement. It may be able to deflate some widely circulated rumours and false impressions derived from media comment". Wilson added that Barker's social science research, in particular her work on the Unification Church, had been instrumental in demonstrating that the brainwashing concept, which for some years had enjoyed popularity in the media, was unable to explain what actually happened in the process of religious conversion, or to explain why so many members of new religious movements actually leave these movements again after a short period.

== Political career ==
Barker, a member of the Liberal Democrats, was an unsuccessful Queen's Park ward candidate in May 2002 and an unsuccessful Kenton ward candidate in May 2006.

== Selected bibliography ==
- Barker, Eileen In the Beginning: The Battle of Creationists Science against Evolutionism, article in the book edited by Roy Wallis On the Margin of Science: The Social Construction of Rejected Knowledge. Sociological Review Monograph 27, Keele, 1979, pp. 179–200
- Barker, Eileen The Making of a Moonie: Choice or Brainwashing?, Blackwell Publishers, November 1984, ISBN 0-631-13246-5
- Barker, Eileen (editor) Of Gods and Men: New Religious Movements in the West Mercer University Press Macon, Georgia, USA 1984 ISBN 0-86554-095-0
- Barker, Eileen New Religious Movements: A Practical Introduction (Paperback) Bernan Press (October 1990) ISBN 0-11-340927-3
- Barker, Eileen, On freedom: a centenary anthology, Transaction Publishers, 1997, ISBN 1-56000-976-4 ISBN 9781560009764
- Barker, Eileen. New Religions, Haft Asman (Seven Heavens), A Journal for the Center for Religious Studies, Vol. 4, no. 19, translated into Persian by Baqer Talebi Darabi, Autumn 2002.
- Barker, Eileen "New Religious Movements" Religions and Beliefs in Britain (GCSE/A'level resource book), Craig Donnellan (ed.), Cambridge: Independence, 2005: 19–22.
