= Anti-cult movement =

The anti-cult movement, abbreviated ACM, consists of various governmental and non-governmental organizations and individuals that seek to raise awareness of religious groups that they consider to be "cults", uncover coercive practices used to attract and retain members, and help those who have become involved with harmful cult practices.

One prominent grouping within the anti-cult movement, Christian counter-cult organizations, opposes new religious movements (NRMs) on theological grounds, categorizing them as cults, and distributes information to this effect through church networks and via printed literature.

== Concept ==
The anti-cult movement is conceptualized as a collection of individuals and groups, whether formally organized or not, who oppose some "new religious movements" (or "cults"). This countermovement has reportedly recruited participants from family members of "cultists," former group members (or apostates), religious groups (including Jewish and Christian groups) and associations of health professionals. Although there is a trend towards globalization, the social and organizational bases vary significantly from country to country according to the social and political opportunity structures in each place.

As with many subjects in the social sciences, the movement is variously defined. A significant minority opinion suggests that analysis should treat the secular anti-cult movement separately from the religiously motivated (mainly Christian) groups.

The anti-cult movement can be divided into four classes:

1. secular counter-cult groups;
2. Christian evangelical counter-cult groups;
3. groups formed to counter a specific cult; and
4. organizations that offer some form of exit counseling.

Most if not all of the groups involved express the view that there are potentially deleterious effects associated with some new religious movements.

=== Hadden's taxonomy of the anti-cult movement ===
Jeffrey K. Hadden sees four distinct classes of opposition to "cults":

1. Opposition grounded on religion
  - Opposition usually defined in theological terms.
  - Cults considered heretical.
  - Endeavors to expose the heresy and correct the beliefs of those who have strayed from a truth.
  - Prefers metaphors of deception rather than possession.
  - Serves two important functions:
    - protects members (especially youth) from heresy, and
    - increases solidarity among the faithful.
2. Secular opposition
  - Regards individual autonomy as the manifest goal – achieved by getting people out of groups that use mind control and deceptive proselytization.
  - Regards the struggle as an issue of control rather than theology.
  - Organizes around families of children currently or previously involved in a cult.
  - Has the unannounced goal of disabling or destroying new religious movements organizationally.
3. Apostates
  - Former members who consider themselves egregiously wronged by a cult, often with the coordination and encouragement of anti-cult groups.
4. Entrepreneurial opposition
  - A few "entrepreneurs" who have made careers of organizing opposition groups.
  - Broadcasters, journalists, and lawyers who base a reputation or career on anti-cult activities.

== Cult-watching groups and individuals, and other opposition to cults ==
=== Family-members of adherents ===
Some opposition to cults (and to some NRMs) started with family-members of cult-adherents who had problems with the sudden changes in character, lifestyle and future plans of their young adult children who had joined NRMs. Ted Patrick, widely known as "the father of deprogramming," exemplifies members of this group. The former Cult Awareness Network (old CAN) grew out of a grassroots-movement by parents of cult-members. The American Family Foundation (today the International Cultic Studies Association) originated from a father whose daughter had joined a high-control group, and other parents concerned about young adult offspring populated the American Family Foundation's membership.

=== Clinical psychologists and psychiatrists ===
From the 1970s onwards some psychiatrists and clinical psychologists accused "cults" of harming some of their members. These accusations were sometimes based on observations made during therapy, and sometimes were related to theories regarding brainwashing or mind control.

=== Former members ===
Anson Shupe, David G. Bromley and Joseph Ventimiglia coined the term atrocity tales in 1979, which Bryan R. Wilson later took up in relation to former members' narratives. Bromley and Shupe defined an "atrocity tale" as the symbolic presentation of action or events, real or imagined, in such a context that they come to flagrantly violate the (presumably) shared premises upon which a given set of social relationships should take place. The recounting of such tales has the intention of reaffirming normative boundaries. By sharing the reporter's disapproval or horror, an audience reasserts normative prescription and clearly locates the violator beyond the limits of public morality.

=== Christian countercult movement ===
In the 1940s, the long-held opposition by some established Christian denominations to non-Christian religions or supposedly heretical, or counterfeit, Christian sects crystallized into a more organized Christian counter cult movement in the United States. For those belonging to the movement, all religious groups claiming to be Christian, but deemed outside of Christian orthodoxy, were considered "cults." Christian cults are new religious movements which have a Christian background but are considered to be theologically deviant by members of other Christian churches. In his influential book The Kingdom of the Cults, first published in the United States in 1965, Christian scholar Walter Martin defines Christian cults as groups that follow the personal interpretation of an individual, rather than the understanding of the Bible accepted by mainstream Christianity. He mentions the Church of Jesus Christ of Latter-day Saints, Christian Science, the Jehovah's Witnesses, Unitarian Universalism, and Unity as examples.

The Christian countercult movement asserts that Christian sects whose beliefs are partially or wholly not in accordance with the Bible are erroneous. It also states that a religious sect can be considered a "cult" if its beliefs involve a denial of what they view as any of the essential Christian teachings such as salvation, the Trinity, Jesus himself as a person, the ministry of Jesus, the Miracles of Jesus, the Crucifixion of Jesus, the Death of Christ, the Resurrection of Christ, the Second Coming of Christ, and the Rapture.

Countercult literature usually expresses doctrinal or theological concerns and a missionary or apologetic purpose. It presents a rebuttal by emphasizing the teachings of the Bible against the beliefs of non-fundamental Christian sects. Christian countercult activist writers also emphasize the need for Christians to evangelize to followers of cults.

=== Governmental opposition ===
The secular opposition to cults and new religious movements operates internationally, though a number of sizable and sometimes expanding groups originated in the United States. Some European countries, such as France, Germany, Belgium and Switzerland have introduced legislation or taken other measures against cults or, where cults are not legally defined, sectarian abuses thereof.

In the Netherlands "cults," sects, and new religious movements have the same legal rights as larger and more mainstream religious movements. As of 2004, the Netherlands do not have an anti-cult movement of any significance.

== National or regional anti-cult movements ==
=== United States ===
The first organized opposition to new religions in the United States appeared in 1971 with the formation of FREECOG (Parents Committee to Free Our Sons and Daughters from the Children of God). In 1973, FREECOG renamed itself as the Volunteer Parents of America, and then the Citizens Freedom Foundation (CFF), before becoming the Cult Awareness Network (CAN) in 1984. In 1979, another anti-cult group, the American Family Foundation (AFF) was founded (which is now the International Cultic Studies Association); it began organizing annual conferences, launched an information phone-line, and published the Cult Observer and the Cultic Studies Journal. In 1996, CAN was sued for its involvement in the deprogramming of a member of the United Pentecostal Church International named Jason Scott. Other parties joined the lawsuit, and this bankrupted the organization. A group which included a number of Scientologists purchased the "Cult Awareness Network" name and formed the "New Cult Awareness Network." In the 1970s and 1980s American anti-cultist and deprogrammer Ted Patrick was charged at least thirteen times and convicted at least three times for kidnapping and unlawful imprisonment for his deprogramming activities. In 1980, Patrick was convicted of "conspiracy, false imprisonment and kidnapping" of Roberta McElfish, a waitress in Tucson, Arizona, after accepting US$7,500 from her family to deprogram her.

=== Europe ===
In the European Union, the FECRIS (Fédération Européenne des Centres de Recherche et d'Information sur le Sectarisme, English: European Federation of Centres of Research and Information on Sectarianism) organization has been active since 1994 as an umbrella for European organizations investigating the activities of groups labeled to be cults or sects.

==== France ====
Anti-cult organizations in France have included the Centre contre les manipulations mentales (1981–) and MILS (Mission interministérielle de lutte contre les sectes; English: "Interministerial Mission in the Fight Against Cults"), operational from 7 October 1998. MIVILUDES, established in 2002, subsumed some of their operations. MIVILUDES has been criticized for the broad scope of its list of cults, which included both non-religious organizations and criteria for inclusion which Bishop Jean Vernette, the national secretary of the French episcopate to the study of cults and new religious movements, said could be applied to almost all religions. MIVILUDES officials are under the French Ministry of the Interior as of January 2020. The About-Picard law against sects and cultic influence that "undermine human rights and fundamental freedoms" as well as mental manipulation was established in 2001.

==== United Kingdom ====
In the UK, MP Paul Rose established the first major British anti-cult group called FAIR (Family Action Information and Rescue/Resource) in 1976. In 1987, Ian Haworth founded the Cult Information Centre. Other groups like Deo Gloria Trust, Reachout Trust, Catalyst, People's Organised Workshop on Ersatz Religion, and Cultists Anonymous also grew during the 1970s and 1980s.

In 1968, after a large movement from the public to investigate Scientology's effects on the health and well-being of its adherents, Minister of Health Kenneth Robinson implemented measures to prevent the immigration of foreign and Commonwealth Scientologists into the United Kingdom. One measure was the automatic denial of student visa applications for foreign nationals seeking to study at Hubbard College at East Grinstead or any other Scientological educational institution. Additionally, work permits to foreign nationals seeking employment in Scientology establishments were restricted. These measures were lifted in 1980 after a 1971 investigation headed by John G. Foster believed that the "Scientology ban" was unfair. Despite this investigation, the European Court of Justice ruled that the United Kingdom was entitled to refuse the right of entry to nationals of European Union member states seeking employment in Scientology establishments. Sociologist Eileen Barker believes that three reasons led to the lifting of the "ban": (1) it was unenforceable, (2) it was hard to defend before the European Court of Human Rights, and (3) it was unfair since it was the only new religious movement that received such treatment. In 1999, the Church of Scientology attempted to obtain charitable status through the Charity Commission of England and Wales, but their application was rejected and the Church did not appeal the decision. In 2013, the UK Supreme Court ruled that the Scientology chapel in London was a "place of meeting for religious worship" that could be registered as a place of marriage to the Registrar General of Births, Deaths and Marriages.

==== Austria ====
In Austria, the anti-cult movement is represented by GSK (Gesellschaft gegen Sekten und Kultgefahren), renamed in 1992 from the Association for Mental Health (Verein zur Wahrung der geistigen Freiheit), founded by psychologist Brigitte Rollett on September 29, 1977, engaged in an information campaign against religious minorities and new religious movements. GSK is a declared member of FECRIS. Between 1992 and 2008, GSK was funded by the state government of the city of Vienna.

=== Australia ===
Australia's anti-cult movement began in the 1970s with the introduction of NRMs like Scientology and the Unification Church. Deprogrammings occurred throughout the 1970s and 1980s that resulted in numerous lawsuits resulting in a national transition away from deprogramming and toward exit counseling. In 2010, independent Senator Nick Xenophon attempted to enact legislation against NRMs – though primarily against the Church of Scientology and their tax-exempt status – similar to those in France. However, his efforts were unsuccessful.

Australia's main anti-cult organization is Cult Information and Family Support (CIFS), run by exit counselor Tore Klevjer. It was founded by Ros Hodgkins, David Richardson, and nineteen others in 1996. CIFS combats NRMs as well as lifestyle coaches and multi-level marketing schemes; The Advertiser wrote in 2017 that it also represents ex-NRM members. Other groups like Cult Counselling Australia (formed in 1991) exist in Australia to provide exit counseling and educational services.

=== Russia ===
In Russia anti-cultism appeared in the early 1990s since the dissolution of the Soviet Union and the 1991 August Coup. Some Russian Protestants criticized foreign missionaries, sects, and new religious movements. They hoped that taking part in anti-cult declarations could demonstrate that they were not "sectarians." In 2008 the Russian Ministry of Internal Affairs prepared a list of "extremist groups." At the top of the list were Islamic groups outside of "traditional Islam" (which is supervised by the Russian government); next were "Pagan cults." In 2009 the Russian Ministry of Justice set up a council called the Council of Experts Conducting State Religious Studies Expert Analysis.

=== China ===
Although China has a long history of sectarian/religious insurrections, such as the Yellow Turban Rebellion, the White Lotus Rebellion and the Taiping Rebellion, the earliest modern anti-cult measures in China date back to the Republic of China, where under Chiang Kai-shek a banning of salvationist religious sects such as the Yiguandao, Guiyidao, the Wushanshe, and the Fellowship of Goodness was enacted. The People's Republic of China's anti-cult movement began in the late 1990s with the development of qigong groups, primarily Falun Gong, as well as other religions like Eastern Lightning. Anti-cult campaigns in the late twentieth century and early twenty-first centuries were founded on "scientific rationality and civilization," according to medical anthropologist Nancy N. Chen. Chinese authorities claimed that by July 2001 that Falun Gong specifically was responsible for over 1,600 deaths through induced suicide by hanging, self-immolation, drownings, among others and the murders of practitioners' relatives. Chinese authorities adopted the negative term "xié jiào" (邪教) to refer to new religious movements. It is roughly translated by "evil cult," but the term dates as far back as the seventh century CE with various meanings.

About 10,000 Falun Gong protestors on 25 April 1999 demonstrated around Zhongnanhai, the seat of the Chinese Communist Party and State Council, to recognize Falun Gong as a legitimate form of spirituality. In response, Beijing specifically labeled Falun Gong an illegal religious organization which violated the Constitution of China in May 1999. On 22 July 1999, the Standing Committee of the National People's Congress specifically banned Falun Gong. On 30 October 1999, the Standing Committee enacted a law that required courts, police, and prosecutors to prosecute "cult" activity generally.

=== Japan ===
A lawyer's organization called the National Network of Lawyers Against Spiritual Sales (NNLASS) was formed to combat the "spiritual sales" organized by the Unification Church and supposedly forced donations. According to NNLASS, the group received over 34,000 complaints about "spiritual sales" and forced donations by 2021 totaling to about 123.7 billion yen (US$902 million). According to Yoshihide Sakurai, Japanese courts originally would require religious groups to return large donations if the person never joined the group, but once the person joined the group, their "spiritual sale" was made completely within their own free will and should not be returned. However, lawyers argued that if the person was forced to make a donation, then they were not making it out of their free will and thus their donation or sale should be returned. Based on a 2006 Tokyo District Court decision, the circumstances of whether or not the Unification Church used illegal recruiting or donation soliciting tactics were to be determined on a case-by-case basis, which was upheld by a 2007 appeal.

In 1995, Aum Shinrikyo, a Japanese new religious movement, attacked a Tokyo subway with sarin gas, killing 14 people and injuring about 1,000. After this incident, mainstream Japanese society faced their "cult problem" directly. Various anti-cult groups – many of them local – emerged from the publicity of the "Aum Affair." One of which is the Japan De-Culting Council (日本脱カルト研究会) on 11 November 1995. It was founded by lawyers, psychologists, academics, and other interested parties like ex-NRM members. It changed its name to the Japan Society for Cult Prevention and Recovery in April 2004.

In 1989, Tsutsumi Sakamoto was an anti-cult lawyer working on a civil case against Aum Shinrikyo. At approximately 3:00 a.m. JST (UTC+9:00), several members of Aum Shinrikyo entered Sakamoto's apartment in Yokohama. He, his wife, Satoko, and his 14-month-old son, Tatsuhiko, were all killed. In the aftermath of the Aum Affair in 1995, some Aum Shinrikyo members and one former member in September 1995 tipped off Japanese police about the general location of the bodies of the three victims, which were scattered to complicate search efforts.

On 8 July 2022, Tetsuya Yamagami allegedly assassinated former Prime Minister of Japan Shinzo Abe. Upon his immediate arrest, Yamagami testified that he was driven by Abe's relationship with the Unification Church. Yamagami's mother made large donations to the Unification Church that bankrupted their family. This incident brought renewed attention to the social issues related to cults in Japan, which include the questionable religious meddling in state politics, fraudulent fundraising in the name of religion, and the welfare of shūkyō nisei (children of religious family).

== Controversies ==
=== Polarized views among scholars ===
Social scientists, sociologists, religious studies scholars, psychologists and psychiatrists have studied the modern field of cults and new religious movements since the early 1970s. Debates about certain purported cults and about cults in general often become polarized with widely divergent opinions, not only among current followers and disaffected former members, but among scholars as well. Most academics agree that some groups have become problematic or very problematic but disagree over the extent to which new religious movements in general cause harm. An article on the categorization of new religious movements in US media criticizes the print media for failing to recognize social-scientific efforts in the area of new religious movements and its tendency to use anti-cultist definitions rather than social-scientific insight."

Scholars in the field of new religious movements confront many controversial subjects:

- The validity of the testimonies of former members.
- The validity of the testimonies of current members.
- The validity of and differences between exit counseling and coercive deprogramming.
- The validity of evidence of harm caused by "cults".
- Ethical concerns regarding new religious movements, for example free will and freedom of speech.
- Opposition to "cults" vs. freedom of religion and religious intolerance.
- The objectivity of all scholars studying new religious movements.
- The acceptance or rejection of the APA Task Force on Deceptive and Indirect Methods of Persuasion and Control report and the brainwashing thesis generally.

=== Brainwashing and mind-control ===
Over the years various controversial theories of conversion and member retention have been proposed that link mind control to NRMs, and particularly those religious movements referred to as "cults" by their critics. These theories resemble the original political brainwashing theories first developed by the CIA as a propaganda device to combat communism, with some minor changes. Philip Zimbardo discusses mind control as "the process by which individual or collective freedom of choice and action is compromised by agents or agencies that modify or distort perception, motivation, affect, cognition and/or behavioral outcomes," and he suggests that any human being is susceptible to such manipulation. In a 1999 book, Robert Lifton also applied his original ideas about thought reform to Aum Shinrikyo, concluding that in this context thought reform was possible without violence or physical coercion. Margaret Singer, who also spent time studying the political brainwashing of Korean prisoners of war, agreed with this conclusion: in her book Cults in Our Midst she describes six conditions which would create an atmosphere in which thought reform is possible.

James T. Richardson observes that if the NRMs had access to powerful brainwashing techniques, one would expect that NRMs would have high growth rates, yet in fact most have not had notable success in recruitment. Most adherents participate for only a short time, and the success in retaining members is limited. For this and other reasons, sociologists of religion including David G. Bromley and Anson D. Shupe consider the idea that cults are brainwashing American youth to be "implausible." In addition to Bromley, Thomas Robbins, Dick Anthony, Eileen Barker, Newton Maloney, Massimo Introvigne, John Hall, Lorne L. Dawson, Anson D. Shupe, J. Gordon Melton, Marc Galanter, Saul Levine of Mount Wilson FM Broadcasters, Inc, among other scholars researching NRMs, have argued that there exists no scientific theory, generally accepted and based upon methodologically sound research, that supports the brainwashing theories as advanced by the anti-cult movement.

=== Deprogramming and exit counseling ===
Some members of the secular opposition to cults and to some new religious movements have argued that if brainwashing has deprived a person of their free will, treatment to restore their free will should take place, even if the "victim" opposes this. Precedents for this exist in the treatment of certain mental illnesses: in such cases medical and legal authorities recognize the condition as depriving sufferers of their ability to make appropriate decisions for themselves. But the practice of forcing treatment on a presumed victim of "brainwashing" (one definition of "deprogramming") has constantly proven controversial. Human-rights organizations (including the ACLU and Human Rights Watch) have criticized deprogramming. While only a small fraction of the anti-cult movement has had involvement in deprogramming, several deprogrammers (including a deprogramming pioneer, Ted Patrick) have served prison terms for acts sometimes associated with deprogramming including kidnapping, while courts have acquitted others.

== See also ==
- Religious persecution
