= Opportunity structure =

Sociology concept

Opportunity structures, in sociology and related social science disciplines, are exogenous factors which limit or empower collective actors (social movements). In explaining the evolution of social movements, the structuralist approach emphasizes that factors external to the movements themselves, such as the level and type of state repression, or the group's access to political institutions, shape the development of the movement; such factors are called opportunity structures.

== Components ==
Doug McAdam summarizes at least four key dynamic components of the political opportunity structure:

1. the relative openness or closure of the institutionalized political system;

2. the stability or instability of the broad set of elite alignments that typically undergird a polity;

3. the presence or absence of elite allies;

4. and the state's capacity and propensity for repression.

== Collective action ==
Political opportunity structures can constrain or expand the field of collective action in four ways:

1. they expand the group's own opportunities;
2. they expand opportunities for others;
3. create opportunities for opponents
4. and create opportunities for elites
