= Centrepoint (commune) =

Commune in Albany, New Zealand

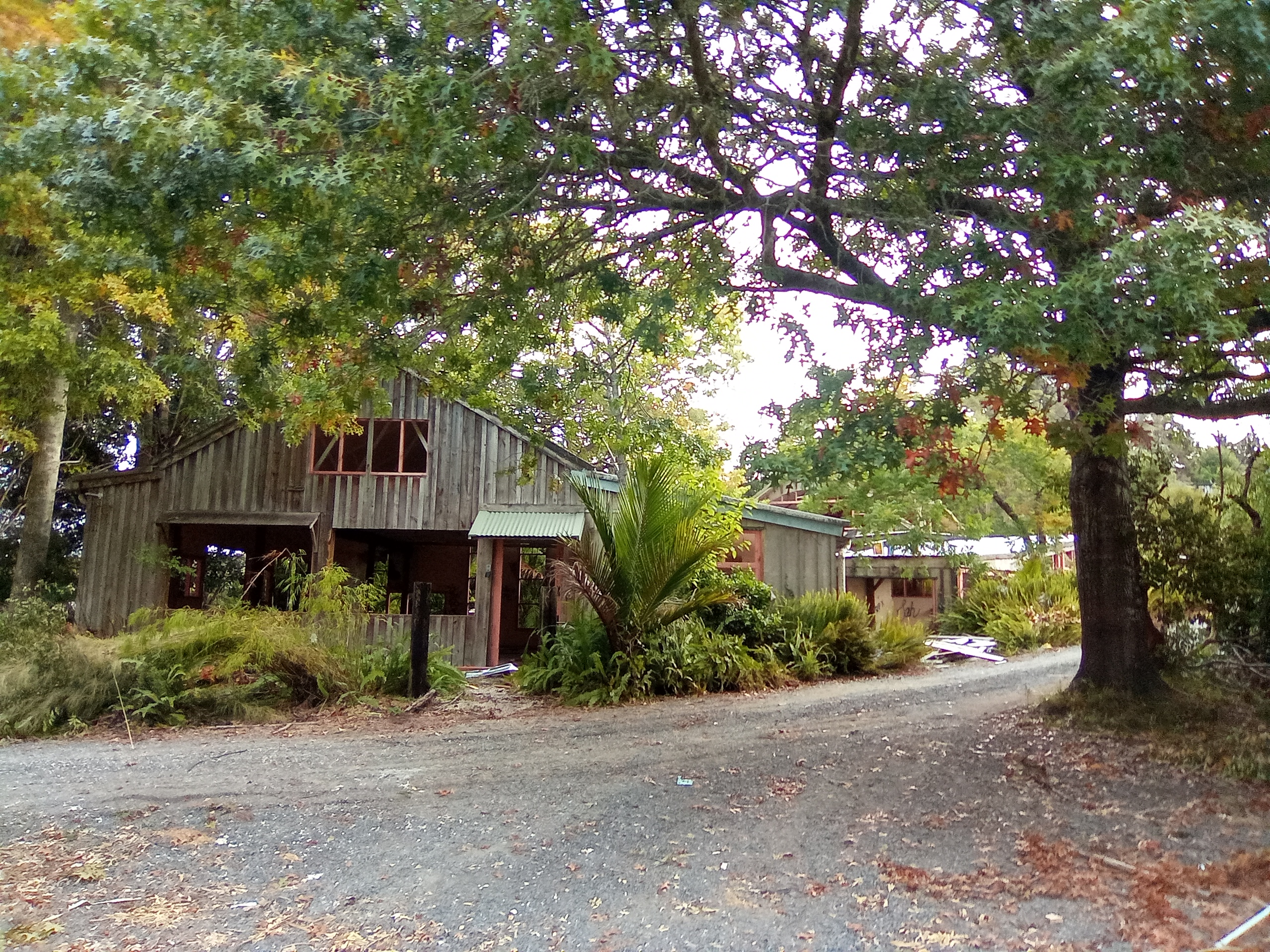
Centrepoint site in April 2025

Centrepoint was a commune in Albany, New Zealand, founded in 1977 by Herbert "Bert" Thomas Potter. The commune reached a maximum population of 275. Centrepoint has been described as a cult, and was the site of widespread sexual coercion and child sexual abuse.

In 1992, Potter was sentenced to a seven-year prison sentence after being convicted of 13 charges of indecently assaulting five girls between 1979 and 1984. Justice Blanchard said that Potter had "systematically corrupted children for his own sexual pleasure and had abused the power and trust community members placed in him". Potter returned to Centrepoint on his release in March 1999, and left a year later after being paid to do so by commune members. The commune was disestablished by court order in March 2000.

== Drug use at the commune ==
MDMA (ecstasy) and LSD were manufactured onsite in large quantities. There are also allegations in media reports that LSD and ketamine were manufactured on the site and that 'busloads' of members would travel to a farm owned by the community to gather ergot infested rye grass to be used in the making of LSD. Three members were convicted of charges relating to the supply, conspiracy to supply and attempted manufacture of the class B drug.

Recollections from members who were present at the time indicate that only MDMA was manufactured from sassafras oil (source of safrole, a precursor for MDMA), which at that time was readily available in bulk and only restricted in 1994. The LSD was most likely imported or obtained from local sources and the ketamine was diverted from veterinary sources by a resident vet.

The drugs were widely used by most members of the community in large groups, family units, or by people on their own to deepen the psychotherapy that was at the heart of Bert's teachings. Teenagers as young as 13 were allegedly pressured to partake by adult counsellors and some of the female teenagers report being given the drug in sessions with Bert specifically for his sexual gratification.

== Impacts on children and young persons ==
A three-year study undertaken by Massey University's School of Psychology culminated in a 260-page report released in May 2010. The study was commissioned by the New Zealand Communities Growth Trust that had been set up by a High Court order to manage the Centrepoint Community Growth Trust assets after the commune was disestablished in 2000.

Twenty-nine men and women in their 20s, 30s, and 40s at the time of the study who had spent at least part of their youth at the commune were interviewed about their experiences of growing up at Centrepoint, including how psychological manipulation, neglect, sexual abuse, and drug taking affected them at the time and subsequently. About 300 children lived at the commune over the 22 years it operated. The qualitative study, titled A Different Kind of Family: Retrospective accounts of growing up at Centrepoint, and implications for adulthood, contains testimonies from some of the 29 interviewees.

Most participants agreed it was common to have sex for the first time between the ages of 11 and 13. Boys "propositioned" by older women found it easier to resist, while sexually abused girls – some as young as 10 – were "idealised" as "being in touch with their loving".

Some of the key findings were:

- Centrepoint was an environment which potentially exposed children to a range of adverse circumstances that extended well beyond the widely reported sexual abuse. Drug use, psychological manipulation, parental neglect, witnessing abuse, corporal punishment, adult conflict, peer bullying, and a parent's imprisonment were just some of the additional factors that may have impacted on them.
- Negative impacts were psychological disorders, substance abuse problems, difficulties in intimate and family relationships, financial problems, lack of direction in education and career, fear of social stigma, and, for some, uncertainty about their perception of reality.
- Different experiences, beliefs, and coping strategies created a tendency towards factionalised perspectives about Centrepoint with some study participants arguing it was fundamentally abusive, and others that it was an ideal place to grow up.
- Stigmatised perceptions of Centrepoint were reported as being further sources of psychological distress.

There have been suggestions that the report was 'watered-down' by excluding some of the testimonial content because they would have been too hard to believe and had an impact on the reception of the report as a whole.

== After Centrepoint ==
In March 2000, the trust that owned the property was disestablished by order of The High Court of New Zealand, and all assets placed under administration by the newly formed New Zealand Communities Growth Trust.

The new trust then leased property to the New Community Group, made up of former Centrepoint members, who formed the Anahata Eco-village. By 2004, about 20 adults and 8 children were resident. In 2007, a group of artists took over the property on a short-term lease and renamed it as Kahikatea Eco-village and art-space.

In December 2008, the Public Trust, as trustee for the New Zealand Community Growth Trust, announced the sale of the 7.6 hectares (19 acres) property and communal living buildings to The Prema Charitable Trust, which subsequently established the Wellpark College North Shore campus on the site as part of the Kawai Purapura Retreat Centre. The centre was closed in May 2024 due to an eviction order from the Prema Charitable Trust. The site caught fire in January 2025, at which point the buildings were derelict and believed to be occupied by squatters.
