= The Family Survival Trust =

Organization

- Action against cultic abuse
- Formation: 1976
- Type: Anti-cult, Nonprofit
- Legal status: Registered charity No. 1121388
- Headquarters: London, United Kingdom
- Parent organization: FECRIS
- Website: https://thefamilysurvivaltrust.org

The Family Survival Trust (FST) is a registered charity (No 1121388) whose mission is to prevent, and to provide information on coercive control, cultic behaviour and psychological manipulation.

It evolved out of the work of FAIR (Family, Action, Information, Rescue/Resource), Britain's main anti-cult group in November 2007.

== History ==
The Family Survival Trust evolved from FAIR (Family, Action, Information, Rescue), Britain's first anti-cult group. FAIR was founded in 1976 by MP Paul Rose, as a support group for friends and relatives of "cult" members, with an early focus on the Unification Church, although in the years following this focus expanded to include other new religious movements (NRMs) or what it referred to as "cults". In the late 1970s, it started to publish FAIR News to provide information and reports on new religious movements.

FST is a member of FECRIS.

== Family, Action, Information, Rescue ==
Family, Action, Information, Rescue (FAIR) was founded by MP Paul Rose in 1976 to address enquiries from constituents and complaints from parents about their adult children joining NRMs. Its membership includes many committed Christians; however, FAIR regarded itself and its outlook as non-religious. However, NRM scholar George D. Chryssides pointed out at the time that "[a]lthough FAIR officials [rejected] the term 'anti-cult', FAIR's main strategy seems designed to hamper the progress of NRMs in a variety of ways." It also publicly disapproved of activities like "Moonie bashing". Yet Elisabeth Arweck adds that FAIR's "commitment to raise cult awareness was tempered by repeated warnings against witchhunts".

The organization renamed itself as "Family, Action, Information, Resource" in 1994 in order to denote a concern "more with the place of these cults in public life and governments than with the issues of recruitment and brainwashing, although these remain[ed] important."

FAIR was initially perceived as supporting "deprogramming", but then publicly distanced itself from it, citing such reasons as high failure rates, damage to families and civil liberty issues. In 1985, FAIR co-chairman Casey McCann said that FAIR neither recommended nor supported coercive deprogramming and disapproved of those practicing it, considering "coercive deprogramming a money-making racket which encouraged preying on the misery of families with cult involvement."

FAIR's applications for government funding were not successful; such funding instead gone to INFORM (Information Network Focus on Religious Movements), set up in 1988 by the sociologist Eileen Barker, with the support of Britain's mainstream churches. Relations between FAIR and INFORM have at times been strained, with FAIR accusing INFORM of being too soft on cults. FAIR chairman Tom Sackville as MP and Home Office minister abolished government funding for the INFORM in 1997 but funds was reinstated in 2000.

In 1987, an ex-FAIR committee member, Cyril Vosper, was convicted in Munich on charges of kidnapping and causing bodily harm to German Scientologist Barbara Schwarz in the course of a deprogramming attempt.

=== Cultists Anonymous ===
In 1985 ex-members of FAIR who believed that the group had become too moderate created a splinter group called Cultists Anonymous. The hardliner Cultists Anonymous group was short-lived and rejoined FAIR in 1991.

== Activities ==
The Family Survival Trust runs online support groups for individuals and families affected by cults or extremist groups.

The FST hosts an Annual Public Event.

== See also ==
- Anti-cult movement
- Casey McCann
- Cultists Anonymous
- Cult Information Centre
- Cyril Vosper
- Decult Conference
- European Federation of Centres of Research and Information on Sectarianism
- MIVILUDES
- Tom Sackville
- Alexandra Stein
