= Decult Conference =

Biennial conference in New Zealand

Decult - Cult Awareness Conference
- Status: active
- Genre: Cult awareness
- Frequency: Biennially
- Venue: Turanga New Central Library
- Location: Christchurch
- Country: New Zealand
- Founder: Anke Richter
- Website: decult.net

The Decult Conference was Australasia’s first-ever cult awareness conference, held in October 2024 in Christchurch, New Zealand, to address the impact of coercive groups and raise awareness about cult-related harm. Organized by journalist and author Anke Richter, the event brought together cult survivors, researchers, mental health professionals, and human rights advocates to discuss coercion, control, and recovery. The conference featured keynote speakers, expert panels, survivor testimonies, and workshops, aiming to improve support services, public understanding, and policy discussions around cultic influence. Decult claims not to be anti-religion, but rather anti-abuse within religious, self-help, and spiritual groups. The conference has been described as a groundbreaking event in the region, drawing international attention to cult awareness and recovery efforts.

== Background ==
Established to address concerns about the availability of support for cult survivors in New Zealand, the conference was organized by journalist and author Anke Richter, who spearheaded the initiative after investigating cults such as Gloriavale and Centrepoint. Richter and other experts argue that New Zealand lacks specialized recovery resources for former members of high-control groups, unlike other Western countries with state-funded cult support organizations.

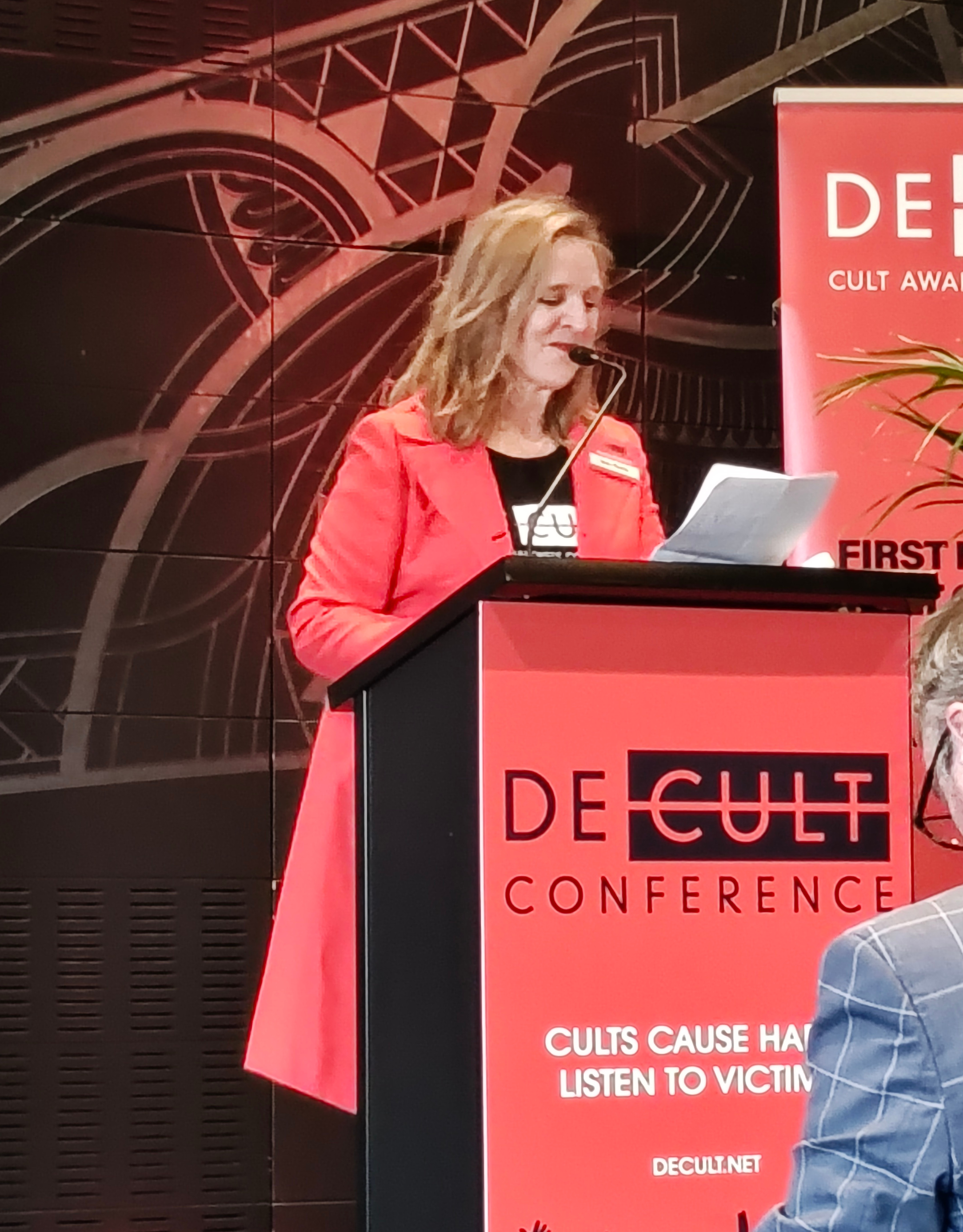
Anke Richter, conference organiser and speaker

== Purpose ==
Aimed at raising awareness about the psychological, social, and legal challenges faced by cult survivors, the Decult Conference also provided specialized training for mental health professionals and social workers. By offering a platform for survivor testimonies, the conference aimed to shift public perception and eliminate misconceptions surrounding cult membership. Through expert discussions and policy advocacy, Decult encouraged governmental action to improve mental health support, establish dedicated cult recovery services, and address coercive control as a serious human rights issue. Organizers stressed the importance of challenging harmful stereotypes, educating professionals, and fostering a supportive network for individuals affected by high-demand groups. Ultimately, the conference sought to inspire systemic change by promoting informed discussions, advancing research, and increasing the availability of resources for those transitioning out of coercive environments.

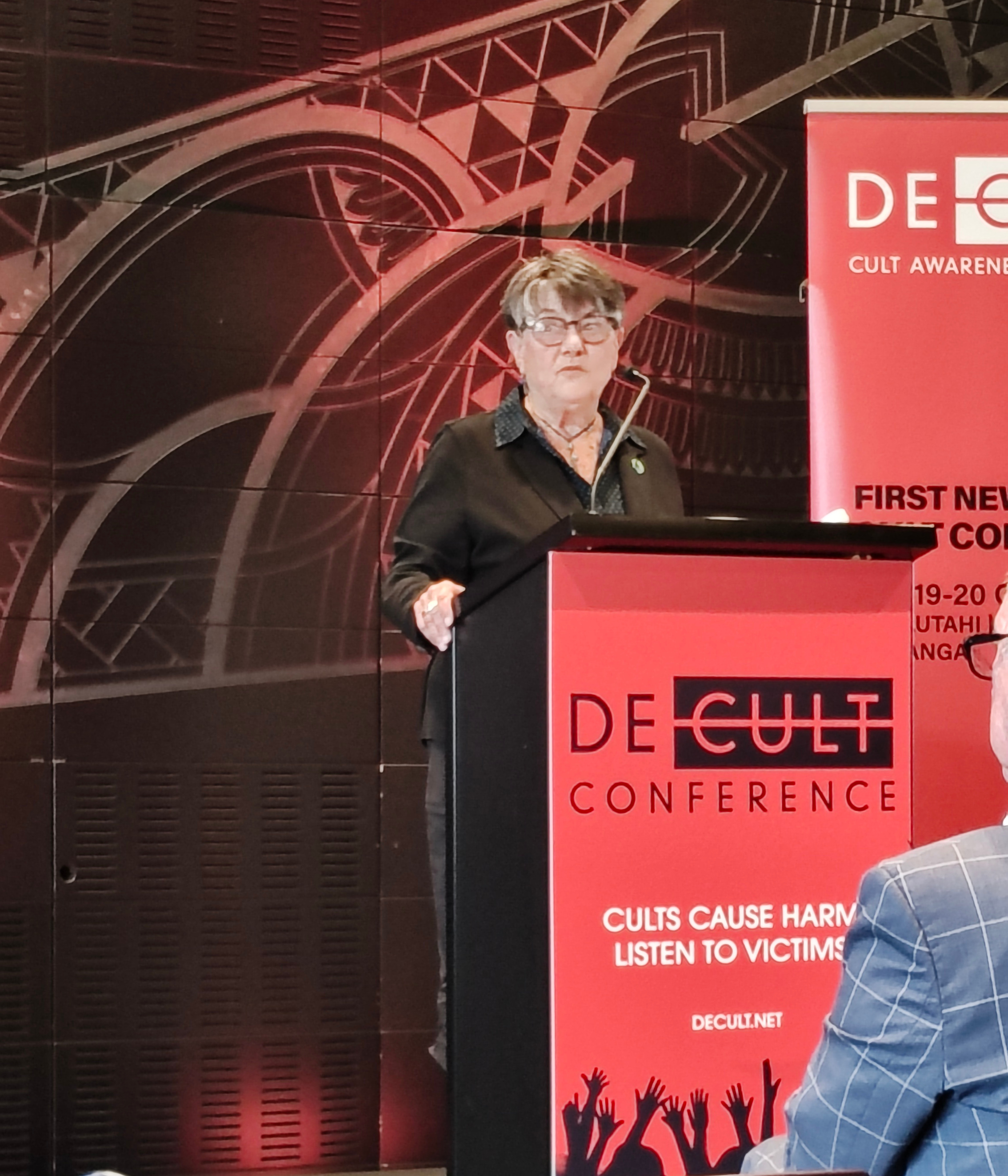
Dr Janja Lalich speaking at the 2024 Decult conference

== Speakers ==
The conference featured international and local experts, including academics, journalists, and survivors. Keynote speaker Janja Lalich, an expert in cultic studies with 38 years of experience, and a decade-lived survivor from a U.S. based Democratic Workers Party (a radical Marxist-Leninist group in the '70s). After the organization collapsed, she realized the group was a cult, and was able to escape from its highly controlling & coercive dynamics. Lalich has authored several books on the subject. In her address, she highlighted the mechanisms of influence and control employed by cults and stressed the need for ongoing research and recovery resources for former members. Other speakers included:

- Gillie Jenkinson, a UK-based psychotherapist specializing in cult recovery, who led a two-day specialist training workshop for mental health professionals.
- Craig Hoyle, an author who detailed his excommunication from the Exclusive Brethren after coming out as gay.
- Caroline Ansley, founder of the Centrepoint Restoration Project, supporting survivors of Auckland’s Centrepoint commune.
- Adam Dudding and David Farrier, journalists who have covered Centrepoint and Arise Church, respectively.

== Conference details ==
Dates	Location	Speakers
October 19–20, 2024	Christchurch, New Zealand	Janja Lalich, Gillie Jenkinson, Craig Hoyle, Caroline Ansley, Adam Dudding, Scott Homan, Sarah Steel, Ekant Veer, Tore Klevjer, Ulrike Schiesser, Luke Hollis, Lindy Jacomb, Maria Esguerra, Andre Afamasaga, Virginia Courage, Laura McConnell, Laura Muir, Bronwyn Rideout, Stephen Judd, Dennis Gates, Anusha Bradley, Rachel Lees, Pearl Valor, Bec Sonkkila, Dhyana Levey, Ciaran Fox, Shayne Mechen, Natalie Malcon, Dave Booda, Lara Kaput, Adam Elmasri, Nicole Matejic, Micki McAllen, Ursula Cheer, Shany Kedar, Mordechai Braunstein, Anke Richter, Dennis Parker, Sue Bagshaw, and Duncan Webb.

== Attendees ==
The Decult Conference attracted a diverse group of participants from around the world, including cult survivors, mental health professionals, academics, journalists, and human rights advocates. Many survivors attended to share their experiences and find support, while mental health professionals and social workers participated to gain specialized training in cult recovery and trauma care. Academics and researchers, particularly those studying high-control groups, used the conference as an opportunity to present findings and discuss emerging trends in coercive environments. Journalists and investigative reporters also took part, covering the event and reporting on the broader implications of cultic influence in New Zealand and beyond. The conference further drew the attention of policymakers and legal experts interested in shaping legislation around coercive control and cult awareness.

Several organizations played a key role in supporting the event, including the Olive Leaf Network, which provides assistance to survivors of religious groups, and the Gloriavale Leavers Support Trust, which aids individuals exiting the Gloriavale Christian Community. The Centrepoint Restoration Project, dedicated to supporting former members of the Centrepoint commune, and Cult Information and Family Support Australia, which provides resources and advocacy for cult survivors, were also involved. Through these collaborations, Decult has fostered a growing network of professionals and survivors dedicated to improving resources and support systems for those affected by coercive groups.

== Training and professional development ==
A key development from the Decult Conference was the introduction of specialized training for mental health professionals. Over 70 participants attended a two-day cult recovery workshop led by Dr Gillie Jenkinson, marking New Zealand’s first-ever formal training program for cult therapists.

Lindy Jacomb, founder of the Olive Leaf Network, noted that prior to this event, New Zealand lacked accredited cult therapists. Her organization has compiled a list of 30 professionals who have experience working with cult leavers, but she hoped the new training would triple the number of experts in the country.

Joyce Alberts, a clinical psychologist, emphasized the need for government funding for trauma-informed therapy and peer support programs. Many cult leavers, she noted, refuse ACC (Accident Compensation Corporation) support due to deep mistrust of governmental institutions.

== Impact ==
The Decult Conference has significantly contributed to cult awareness in New Zealand and beyond, fostering a deeper understanding of coercive groups and their long-term effects on individuals. A major outcome of the event has been the expansion of professional training for therapists and counselors, equipping them with the skills needed to support survivors of high-demand groups. The conference has also sparked discussions about the establishment of a government-supported cult awareness agency, similar to those in other Western countries, to provide long-term assistance and policy recommendations.

Additionally, the event has helped amplify media coverage of high-control groups in New Zealand, bringing renewed attention to organizations such as Gloriavale, Centrepoint, and the Exclusive Brethren. By creating a space for survivors to share their experiences, Decult has strengthened peer support networks, reduced stigma, and encouraged more informed public discourse on the realities of cult involvement and recovery. Overall, the conference has been instrumental in advocating for systemic change, pushing for better mental health services, and promoting survivor-led initiatives to address cultic harm.

== Public perception and media coverage ==
The conference has generated significant media attention, helping to reshape public understanding of cults:

- Experts and speakers challenged stereotypes about cults, emphasizing that they are not always religious and can include self-help movements, business coaching groups, and ideological communities.
- Attendees discussed "cult hopping", where individuals leaving one coercive group often join another due to unmet emotional, social, or spiritual needs.
- The term "cult" should not be avoided, argued keynote speaker Janja Lalich, stating that high-control groups should be recognized for what they are, rather than being downplayed with softer terminology.
- Survivors emphasized the need for transitional support, as many struggle with identity crises and decision-making after leaving their communities.

The conference has also received positive feedback for its safe and respectful environment. Despite concerns about protests or disruptions, the event remained peaceful, fostering constructive dialogue and support for survivors.

== 2026 conference ==
The second Decult Conference is scheduled to be held on 24–25 October 2026 at the Christchurch Town Hall in Christchurch, New Zealand, under the theme Voices of Courage: Pathways to Healing and Justice. The conference is planned as a hybrid event, with sessions available both in person and online.

Māori Anglican bishop Susan Wallace is scheduled to open the conference. Announced keynote speakers include American therapist and cult specialist Rachel Bernstein and psychologist and survivor advocate Christine Marie. The announced programme includes speakers with backgrounds in mental health, journalism, human rights, survivor advocacy and research into coercive control.

== Awards ==
In 2025 Decult received the Champion of Change Advocate Award from The Freedom Train Project.

Decult received the 2026 Margaret T. Singer Award from the International Cultic Studies Association (ICSA).

== Gallery ==
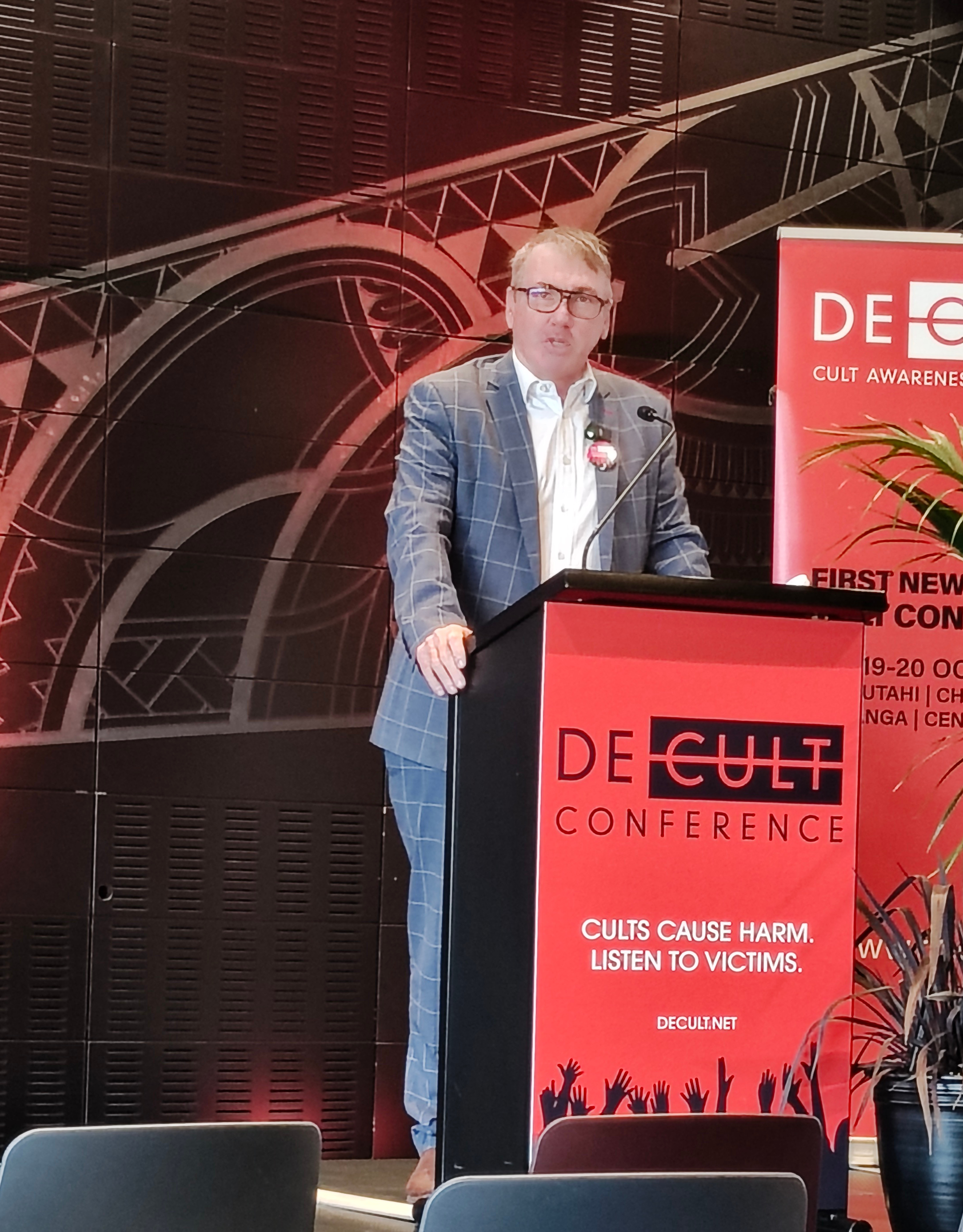
The Honourable Dr Duncan Webb welcomes attendees on day one

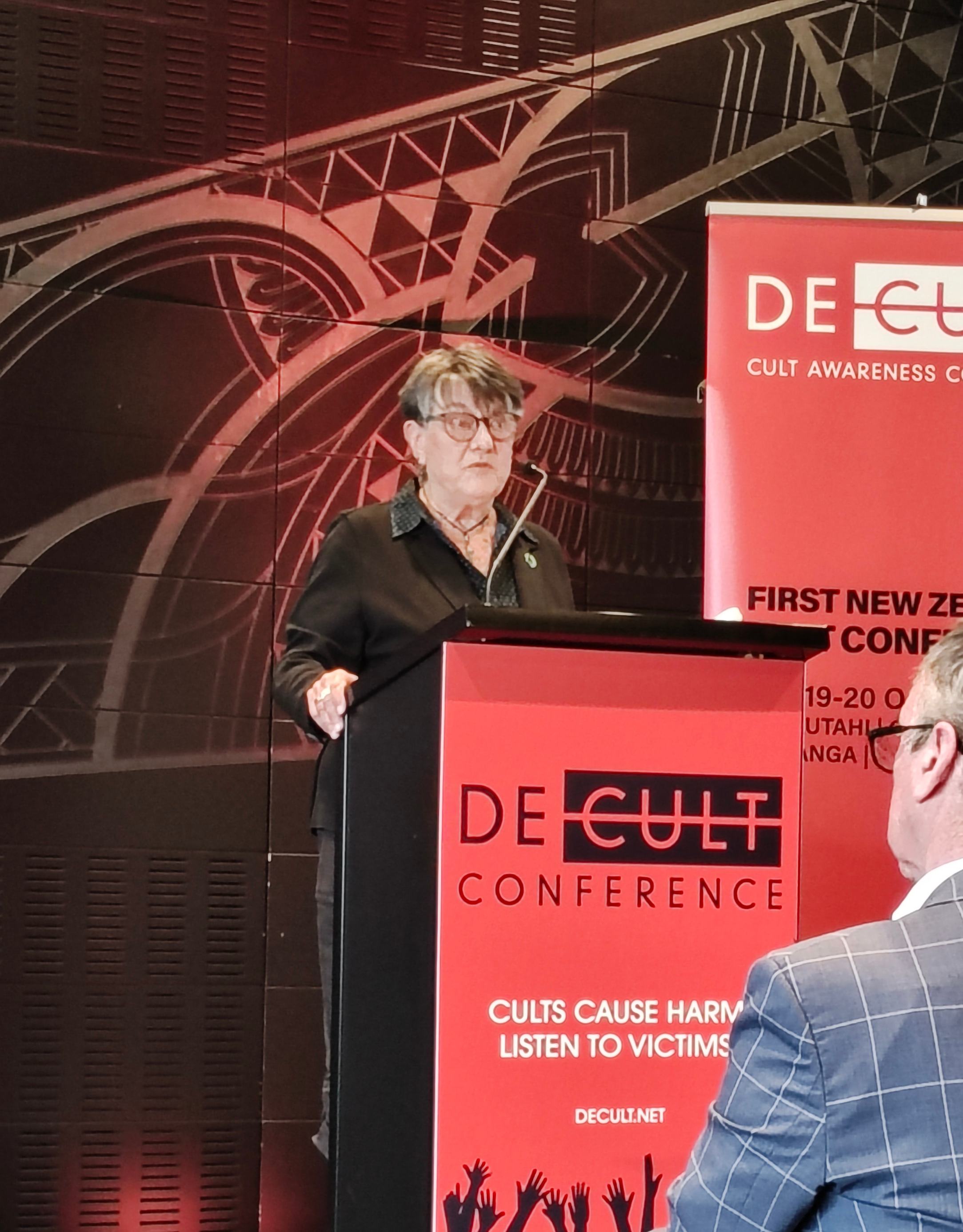
Dr Janja Lalich presenting "Cults 101: Influence and harm of high control groups"

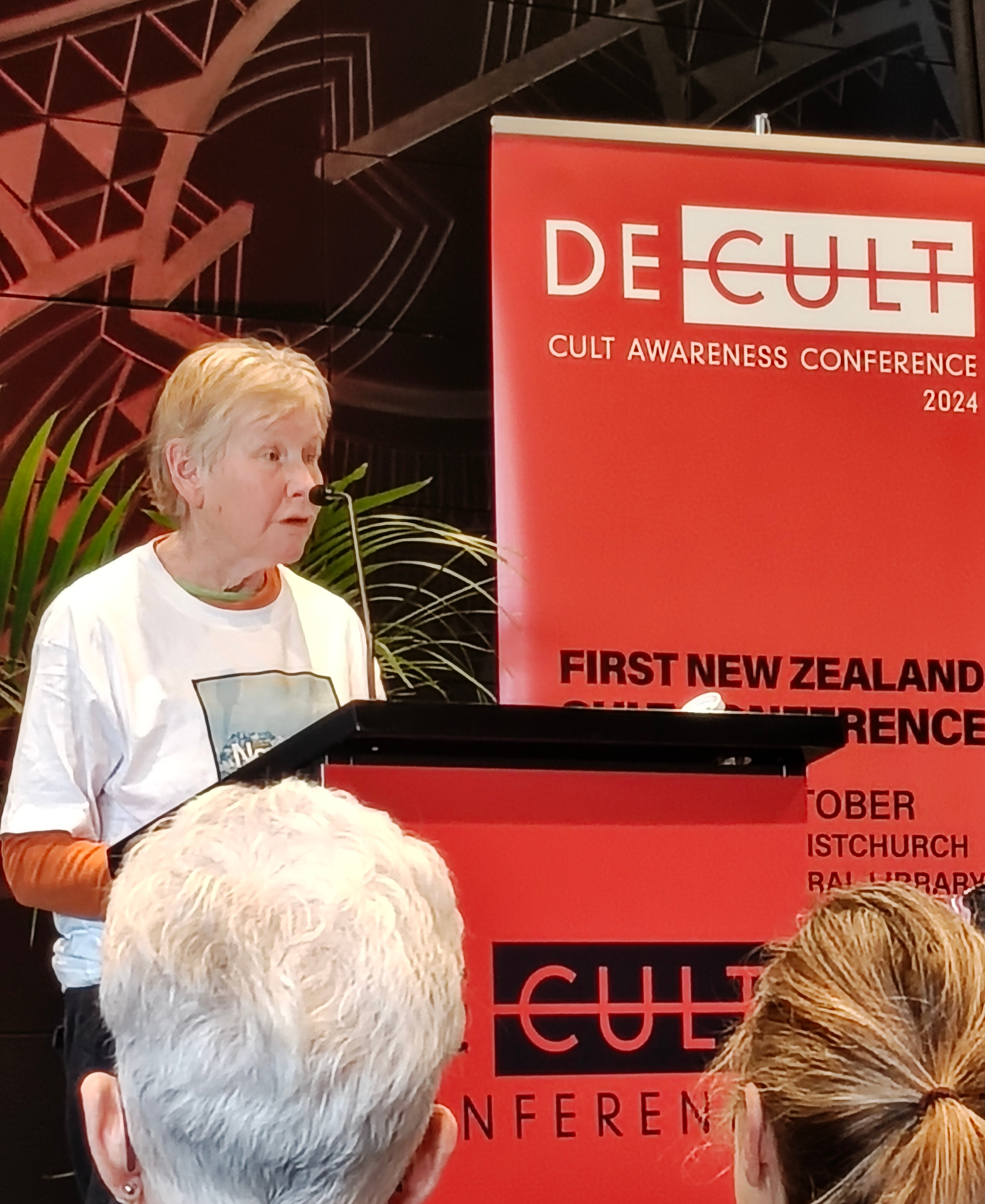
Dame Sue Bagshaw welcomes attendees on day two

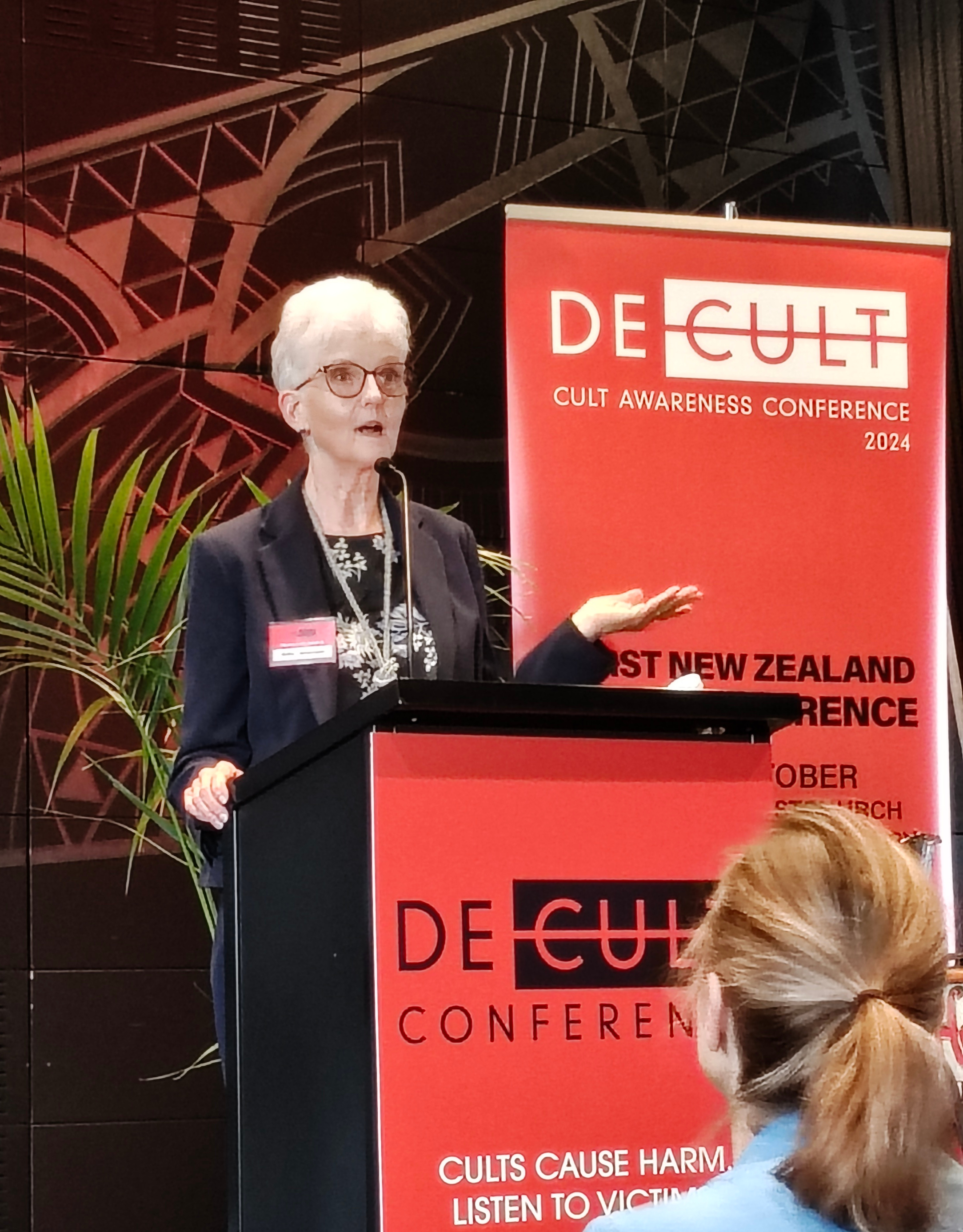
Dr Gillie Jenkinson presents "Walking free from trauma and abuse: A model for cult recovery"

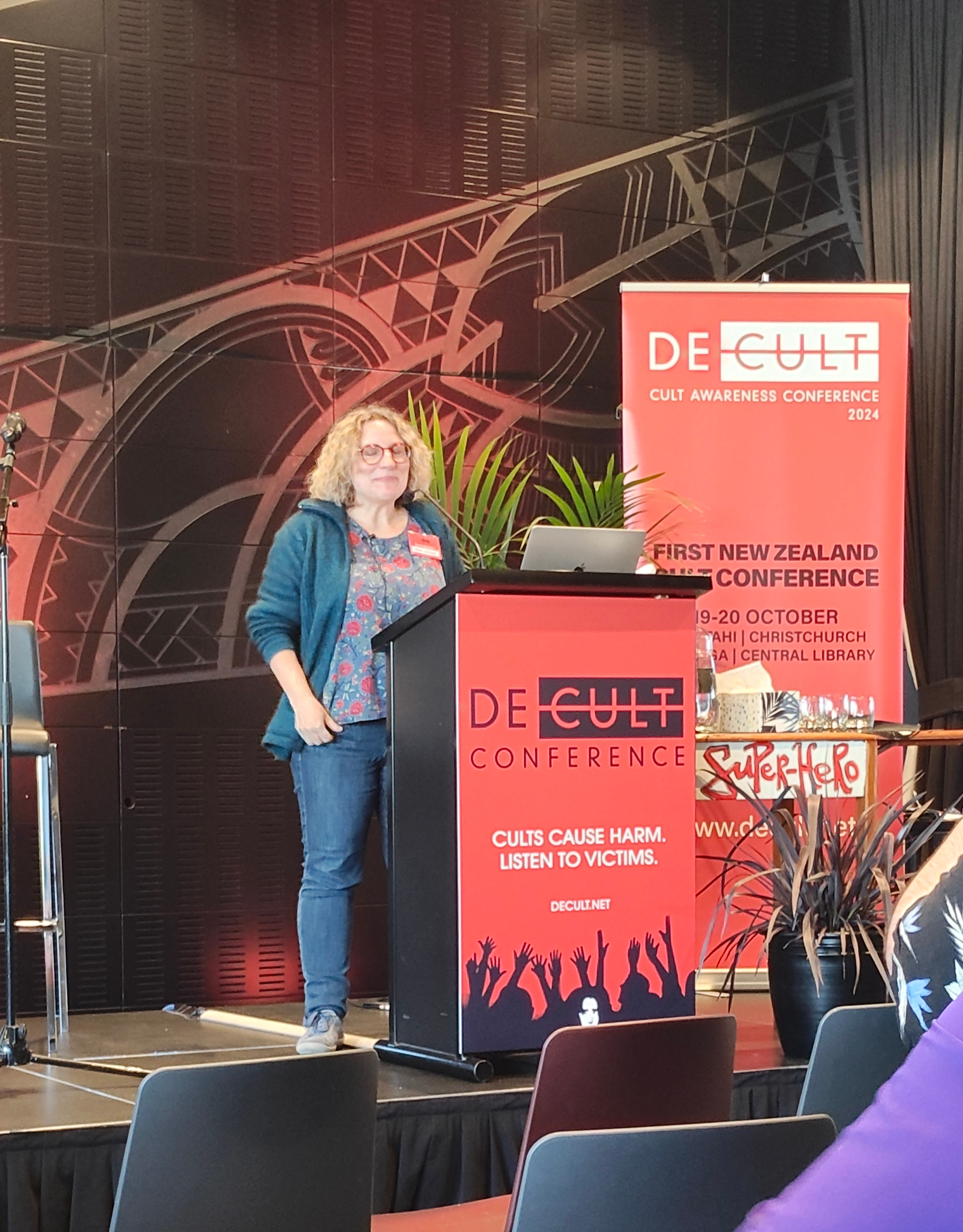
Ulrike Schiesser presenting "Insights from a federal cult information agency"

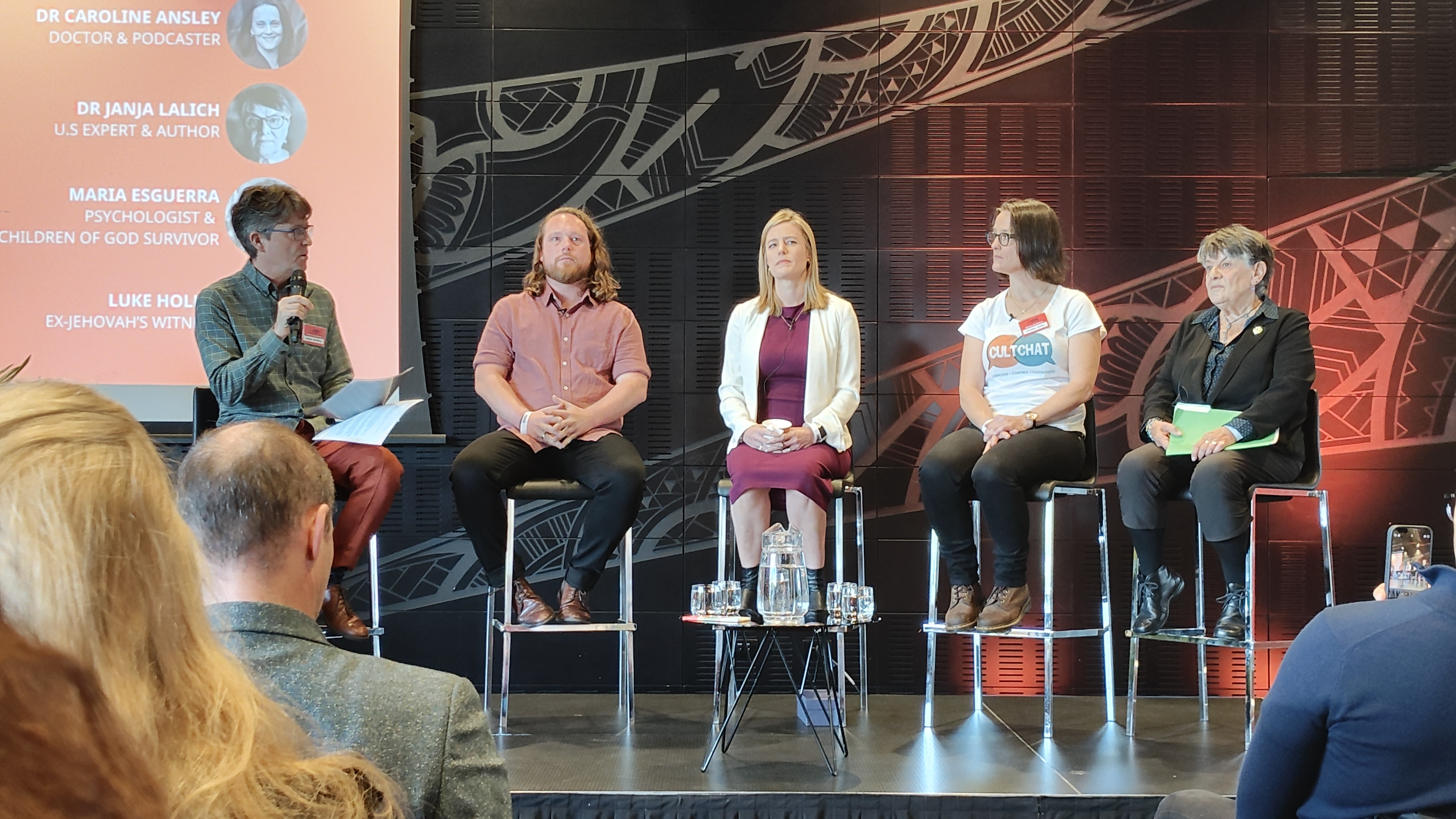
"Kids in Cults: From damage and silence to justice and repair" with Adam Dudding, Luke Hollis, Maria Esguerra, Dr Caroline Ansley and Dr Janja Lalich

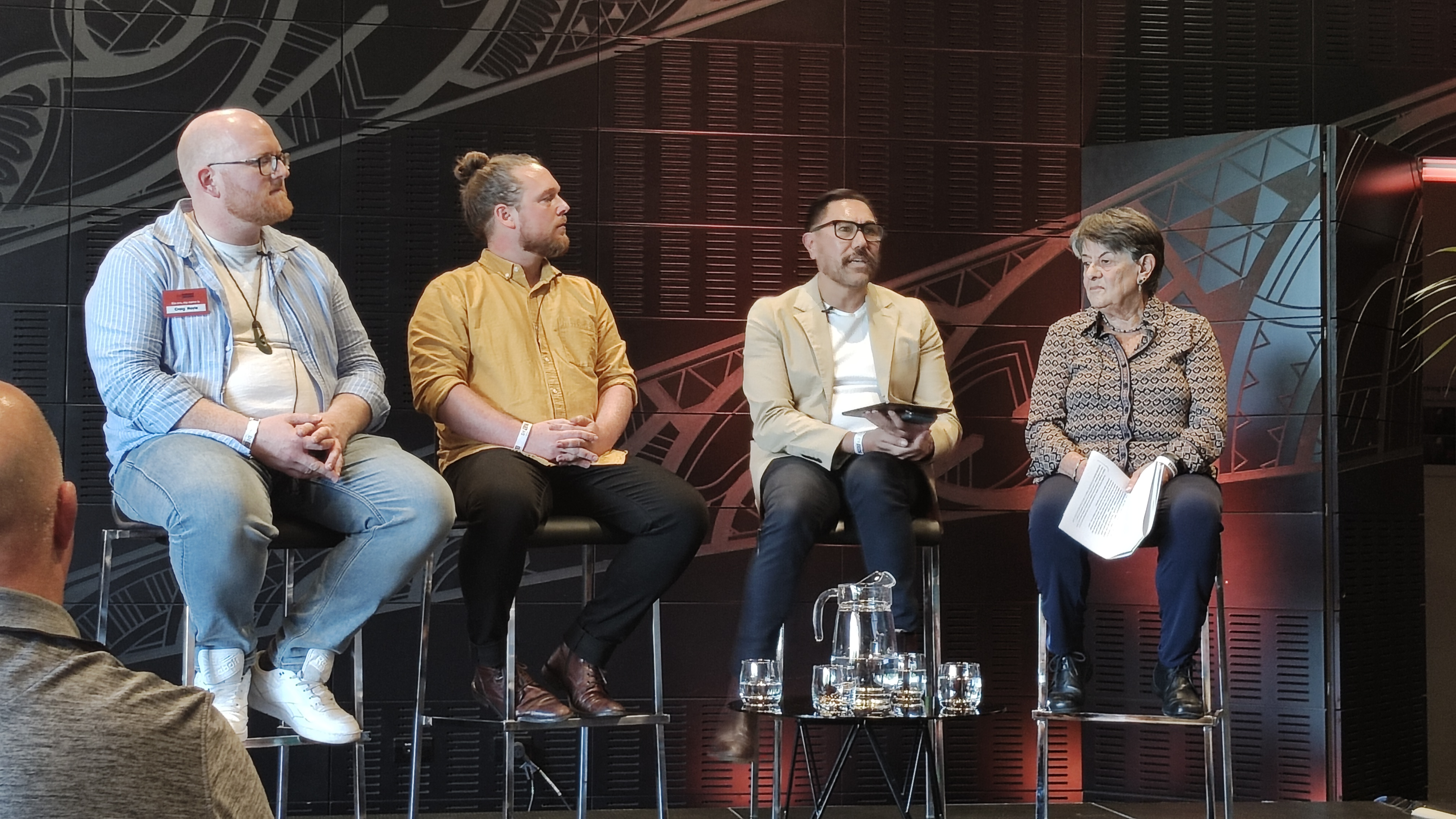
"Invisible rainbow youth: Purity, conversion and coming out in cults" with Craig Hoyle, Luke Hollis, Andre Afamasaga, and Dr Janja Lalich

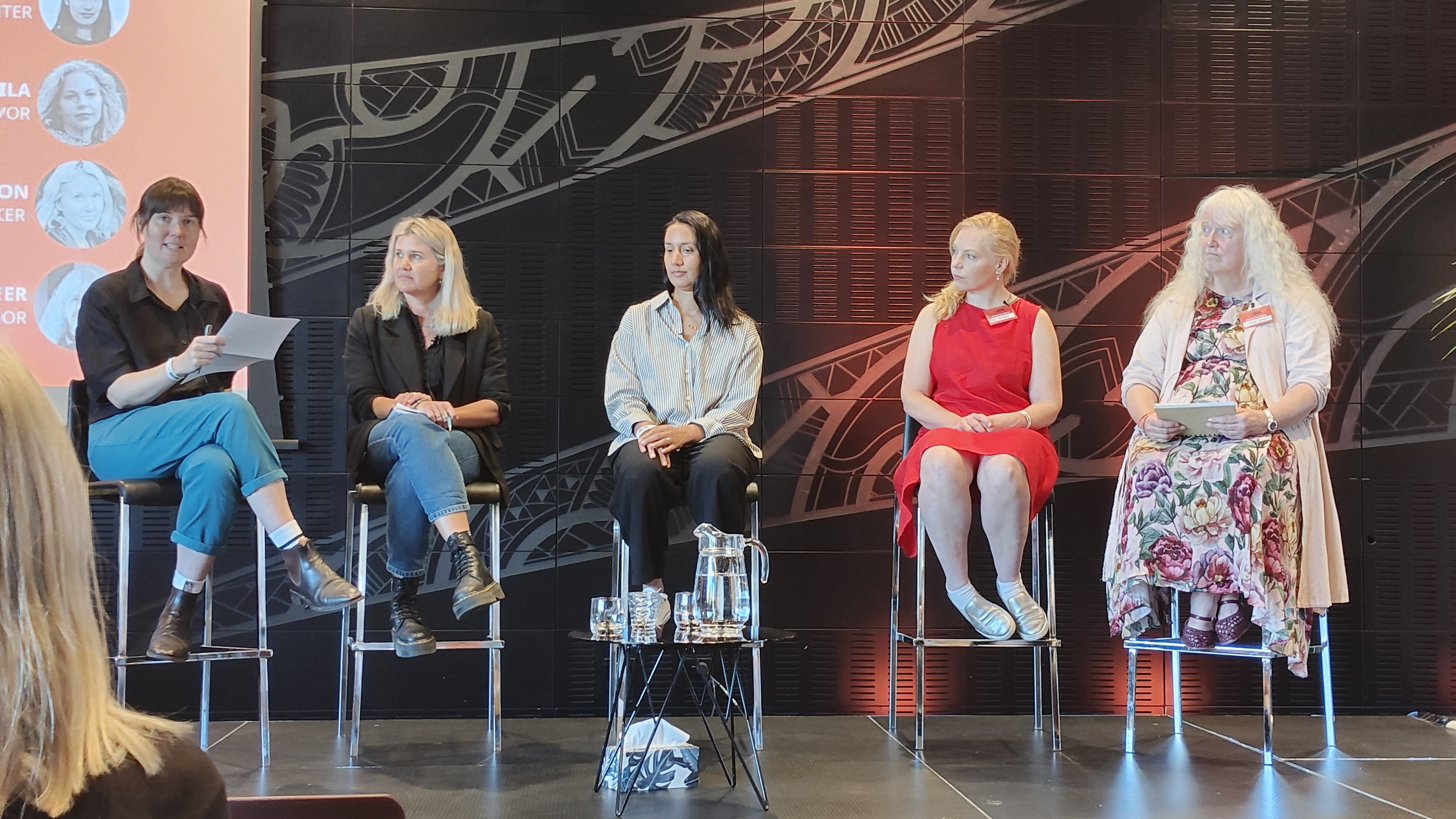
"A new media narrative: Survivor-focussed cult reporting" with Sarah Steel, Natalie Malcon, Anusha Bradley, Bec Sonkkila and Prof Ursula Cheer

== See also ==
- Coercive control
- Religious abuse
- International Cultic Studies Association
- Exit counseling
- Brainwashing
- Spiritual abuse
