= Academic study of new religious movements =

Three basic questions have been paramount in orienting theory and research on NRMs [new religious movements]: what are the identifying markers of NRMs that distinguish them from other types of religious groups?; what are the different types of NRMs and how do these different types relate to the established institutional order of the host society?; and what are the most important ways that NRMs respond to the sociocultural dislocation that leads to their formation?

— Sociologist of religion David G. Bromley

The academic study of new religious movements is known as new religions studies (NRS). The study draws from the disciplines of anthropology, psychiatry, history, psychology, sociology, religious studies, and theology. Eileen Barker noted that there are five sources of information on new religious movements (NRMs): the information provided by such groups themselves, that provided by ex-members as well as the friends and relatives of members, organizations that collect information on NRMs, the mainstream media, and academics studying such phenomena.

The study of new religions is unified by its topic of interest, rather than by its methodology, and is therefore interdisciplinary in nature. A sizeable body of scholarly literature on new religions has been published, most of it produced by social scientists. Among the disciplines that NRS uses are anthropology, history, psychology, religious studies, and sociology. Of these approaches, sociology played a particularly prominent role in the development of the field, resulting in it being initially confined largely to a narrow array of sociological questions. This came to change in later scholarship, which began to apply theories and methods initially developed for examining more mainstream religions to the study of new ones.

The majority of research has been directed toward those new religions which have attracted a greater deal of public controversy; less controversial NRMs have tended to be the subject of less scholarly research. It has also been noted that scholars of new religions have often avoided researching certain movements which tend instead to be studied by scholars from other backgrounds; the feminist spirituality movement is usually examined by scholars of women's studies, African diaspora new religions by scholars of Africana studies, and Native American new religions by scholars of Native American studies.

== Historical development ==
In Japan, the academic study of new religions appeared in the years following the Second World War.

In the 1960s, American sociologist John Lofland lived with Unification Church missionary Young Oon Kim and a small group of American church members in California and studied their activities in trying to promote their beliefs and win new members. Lofland noted that most of their efforts were ineffective and that most of the people who joined did so because of personal relationships with other members, often family relationships. Lofland published his findings in 1964 as a doctoral thesis entitled: "The World Savers: A Field Study of Cult Processes" and in 1966 in book form by Prentice-Hall as Doomsday Cult: A Study of Conversion, Proselytization, and Maintenance of Faith. It is considered to be one of the most important and widely cited studies of the process of religious conversion, as well as one of the first sociological studies of a new religious movement.

In Western nations the study of new religions became a distinct field in the 1970s; prior to this, new religions had been examined from varying perspectives, with Pentecostalism for instance being studied by church historians and cargo cults by anthropologists. This Western academic study of new religions emerged in response to growing public concerns regarding the emergence of various NRMs during the 1970s. By the latter part of that decade, increasing numbers of papers on new religions were being presented at the annual conferences of the American Academy of Religion, Society for the Scientific Study of Religion, and the Association for the Sociology of Religion. The manner in which the scholarly study of new religions rose to prominence due to the public perception that these movements were social threats bore similarities with the manner in which Islamic studies grew in Western nations following the September 11 attacks in 2001. The study of new religions would only be fully embraced by the Western religious studies establishment in the 1990s.

In 1988, the charity INFORM (Information Network Focus on Religious Movements) was established by Barker, who was then a professor of sociology at the London School of Economics. The organization was supported by the UK Home Office and the British established churches and was designed to conduct research and disseminate accurate information about new religions. Barker established INFORM due to her "conviction that a great deal of unnecessary suffering has resulted from ignorance of the nature and characteristics of the current wave of [NRMs] in the West." Also in 1988, the Italian scholar Massimo Introvigne established CESNUR (Centre for Studies on New Religions) in Turin; it brought together academics studying NRMs in both Europe and North America. In the United States, CESNUR gained representation through the Institute for the Study of American Religion in Santa Barbara, California, which was directed by J. Gordon Melton.

Scholars of new religion often operate in a politicized environment given that their research can be cited in legal briefs and judicial decisions regarding NRMs. In Barker's view, academic research into NRMs had practical applications in dealing with the problems that people experience with regard to NRMs. It can, for example, provide accurate information about a particular religious movement that can help guide an individual's reactions to the group; "an awareness of the complexity of a situation might help people to avoid precipitous actions that would later have been regretted." Sympathetic scholarly groups have been accused of uncritically believing what NRMs tell them, being pro-NRM, or ignoring the issues raised by ex-members. The term "cult apologists" is sometimes used.

== Notable researchers ==
Inclusion in this list assumes having both the requisite training as well as actually conducting at least one research study on cults and/or new religious movements (using accepted methodological standards common in the research community), published in a peer-reviewed journal or academic book.

Name	Lifetime	Field	Notes
Thomas Alexander	1935–	History	Alexander, a professor of history at Brigham Young University, is the author of many scholarly books and articles on the history of the Church of Jesus Christ of Latter-day Saints.
Dick Anthony	1939–2022	Psychology	Anthony holds a PhD from the Graduate Theological Union, Berkeley, California, and has supervised research at the department of psychiatry of the University of North Carolina at Chapel Hill and at the Graduate Theological Union, Berkeley. His research has been supported by agencies such as the National Institute of Mental Health, the National Institute of Drug Abuse and the National Endowment for the Humanities, and he has frequently testified or acted as a consultant in court cases involving NRMs. He has been a leading critic of brainwashing and mind control theories and has defended NRMs, arguing that involvement in them has often been shown to have beneficial, rather than harmful effects.
Elisabeth Arweck	1959–	Religious studies	Arweck specializes in religious diversity in Europe and the United States. She wrote Researching New Religious Movements: Responses and Redefinitions (2006) which analyzes the perception and responses for and against NRMs in various cultures.
Eileen Barker	1938–	Sociology	Barker is professor emeritus of the sociology department at the London School of Economics. She is founder and chairperson of INFORM (Information Network Focus on Religious Movements), past-Chairperson of the British Sociological Association's Study Group for the Sociology of Religion, past-President of the Society for the Scientific Study of Religion, and past-President of the Association for the Sociology of Religion. Her work has included hundreds of articles, books, reviews and consultations with governments.
James A. Beckford	1942–2022	Sociology	Beckford is professor emeritus of sociology at the University of Warwick, a Fellow of the British Academy, and a former president of both the Association for the Sociology of Religion and the International Society for the Sociology of Religion. He has authored or edited a dozen books about new religious movements and cult controversies and has contributed about 100 journal articles and book chapters to the field. He is associated with Eileen Barker's INFORM (Information Network Focus on Religious Movements), a UK charity that disseminates information on NRMs to government and the public at large.
Benjamin Beit-Hallahmi	1943–	Psychology	Beit-Hallahmi graduated with a B.A. degree from Hebrew University, and received his M.A. and PhD from Michigan State University. He has served as senior lecturer in psychology at the University of Haifa, and has held faculty roles in clinical and research capacities at The University of Michigan, the University of Pennsylvania, Hebrew University, Michigan State University, and Tel Aviv University. Beit-Hallahmi is the author of Psychoanalysis and Religion: A Bibliography, and co-author of The Social Psychology of Religion; he edited Research in Religious Behavior. He has published scholarship analyzing practices within standards of researching new religious movements.
Stefano Bigliardi	1981–	Philosophy of religion and science	Bigliardi is an associate professor of philosophy at Al Akhawayn University. He has interests in the relationship between science and religion, in pseudoscience and its intersections with Islam and new religious movements, and in ancient aliens/esoteric literature including authors Mauro Biglino, Robert Charroux, Erich von Däniken, Peter Kolosimo, Jean Sendy, Brinsley Le Poer Trench, and Manly P. Hall. He has published New Religious Movements and Science (2023) and Islam and Pseudoscience (2025) for Cambridge University Press; other new religious or spiritual movements he has published peer-reviewed articles and chapters about include: Scientology, the Raelian movement, Falun Gong, the Mexican Santa Muerte, Märtha Louise of Norway's "Angel School," the Italian satanist organization Bambini di Satana, and Stella Azzurra (an Italian branch of Santo Daime).
Edward Breschel		Sociology	Breschel is a professor of sociology, social work, and criminology at Morehead State University. He co-authored "General Population and Institutional Elite Support for Social Control of New Religious Movements: Evidence from National Data Survey," Behavioral Science and the Law 10 (1992): 39–52 with David G. Bromley.
David G. Bromley	1941–	Sociology	Bromley is a professor of sociology at Virginia Commonwealth University, Richmond, Virginia, and the University of Virginia, Charlottesville, Virginia, a past president of the Association for the Sociology of Religion, and a former editor of the Journal for the Scientific Study of Religion. His publishing has concentrated both on new religious movements and the anti-cult movement that arose to oppose them; he and Anson Shupe became "the primary social science interpreters of that countermovement in a series of books and articles." He is an ordained minister in the United Methodist Church.
Jonathan Butler	1948–	History	Butler is an historian of religion. He worked as an associate professor of church history at Loma Linda University in California, and also taught at Union College in Nebraska. He was co-editor of the magazine Adventist Heritage. He authored an article in 1979 claiming Ellen White's endtime scenario was culturally conditioned to the point of being more at place in her time than now.
Colin Campbell		Sociology	Campbell wrote an influential article in A Sociological Yearbook of Religion in Britain about the taxonomy of "cult" and secularization.
Jean-Pierre Chantin	1961–	History	Chantin is a French historian, associated with the University of Lyon. He specializes in the history of religion in France, including the Catholic Church and the role of new religious movements. In 1998 his study of Jansenism was published by the University of Lyon. In 2001 he was the chief editor of Dictionnaire du monde religieux dans la France contemporaine. In 2004 he published a 157-page study on French sects from 1905 to 2000, asking: "disputes or religious innovations?"
George D. Chryssides	1945–	Religious studies	Chryssides is the author, contributor and editor for several references covering new religious movements. He is senior lecturer for Religious Studies at the University of Wolverhampton, and has served in various organizations related to the study of religion.
John Gordon Clark	1926–1999	Psychiatry	Clark was a doctor and professor at Harvard Medical School. He authored an article on cults for the Journal of the American Medical Association.
Peter B. Clarke	1940–2011	Sociology	Clarke was professor emeritus of the history and sociology of religion at King's College London, a professorial member of the faculty of theology at the University of Oxford, and the founding editor of the Journal of Contemporary Religion. His publications include Japanese New Religions: In Global Perspective (editor), New Religions in Global Perspective: A Study of Religious Change in the Modern World and the Encyclopedia of New Religious Movements (editor).
Dan Cohn-Sherbok	1945–	Religious studies	Cohn-Sherbok is a rabbi of Reform Judaism, a Jewish theologian and a prolific author on religion. He is professor emeritus of Judaism at the University of Wales. He has written on Messianic Judaism, Christian Zionism, and other new religious movements related to Judaism.
Douglas E. Cowan	1958–	Religious studies	Cowan teaches at Renison College, University of Waterloo, Ontario, Canada, and is one of the co-general editors of Nova Religio: The Journal of New and Emergent Religions.
Lorne L. Dawson		Sociology	Dawson is professor of sociology and chair of the department of religious studies at the University of Waterloo. His publications include Comprehending Cults (1998), Cults and New Religions (2003) and Religion Online (2004); in addition, he has authored numerous scholarly articles and book chapters on the study of new religions, religion and the internet and related topics.
Régis Dericquebourg	1947–	Sociology	Dericquebourg is a sociologist of religions. He wrote his thesis on Jehovah's Witnesses under the direction of Jean Seguy. He holds a doctorate in psychosociology and a postgraduate degree in clinical psychology from the Institute of Paris 7. He is a member of the Group for the Study of Religions and Secularity at the National Center for the Scientific Studies in Paris, and a professor at the Charles de Gaulle University – Lille III. He published five books, many sociological articles in collective books, encyclopedias and journals and regularly participated in conferences on sociology. His contributions are mainly on Jehovah's Witnesses, healing churches and new religious movements.
Karel Dobbelaere	1933–	Sociology	Dobbelaere is an emeritus professor at both the University of Antwerp and the Catholic University of Leuven in Belgium. He is past president and general secretary of the International Society for the Sociology of Religion. His teaching focus was on sociology and the sociology of religion. His research fields have included changes in religious participation and new religious sectarian movements.
Asbjørn Dyrendal		Religious studies	Dyrendal is a professor of philosophy and religious studies at Norwegian University of Science and Technology. He specializes in conspiracy theories and new religious movements. He wrote, for example, "The Role of Conspiracy Mentality and Paranormal Beliefs in Predicting Conspiracy Beliefs Among Neopagans," International Journal for the Study of New Religions 8, no. 1 (2018): 73–91 with James R. Lewis and Leif Edward Ottesen Kennair.
Steve Eichel	1954–	Psychology	Eichel is a psychologist known primarily for his work on destructive cults, coercive persuasion, mind control, brainwashing, and deprogramming. He is a former president of the Greater Philadelphia Society of Clinical Hypnosis and the 2006–07 president of the American Academy of Counseling Psychology, the national membership academy comprising American Board of Professional Psychology (ABPP) board-certified counseling psychologists. Eichel is the president of the board of the International Cultic Studies Association (ICSA).
Ronald Enroth	1938–	Sociology	Enroth is a widely published author and prominent Christian countercultist who has done work in the area of abusive evangelical Christian congregations and new religious movements. He is professor emeritus of sociology at Westmont College in Santa Barbara, California.
Richard Kent Evans		Religious studies	Evans is visiting professor of religion at Haverford College. He authored MOVE: An American Religion (2020) about the MOVE movement in Philadelphia, which was sometimes described as an NRM.
Arthur Fauset	1899–1983	Anthropology	Fauset was a noted civil rights activist, anthropologist, folklorist, and educator. He belonged to the Philadelphia Anthropology Society, the American Anthropological Association, and the American Folklore Society. Elsie Clews Parsons supported him throughout his career in anthropology and with her support Fauset published his PhD on African American cults in Philadelphia, New York and Chicago, Black Gods of the Metropolis in 1944.
Thomas Forsthoefel		Religious studies	Forsthoefel is a professor of religious studies at Mercyhurst College in Erie, Pennsylvania, as well as a poet and author. He has a special interest in Hinduism and Buddhism and has written on both new religious movements and established traditions within these faiths, while his own background is Roman Catholic. Forsthoefel's published books include: Four charismatic thinkers on violence and non-violence: analysis and evaluation (Loyola University of Chicago, 1987), Epistemologies of religious experience in medieval and modern Vedānta (University of Chicago Divinity School, 1998), Knowing beyond knowledge: epistemologies of religious experience in classical and modern Advaita (Ashgate, 2002), Gurus in America co-editor with Cynthia Ann Humes (SUNY Press, 2005), Soulsong: Seeking Holiness, Coming Home (Orbis Books, 2006), and The Dalai Lama: essential writings editor (Orbis Books, 2008).
Daniel Foss	1940–2014	Sociology	Foss is a sociologist and author. He taught at the School for Critical Studies at the California Institute of the Arts, at Livingston College, and at the Newark College of Arts and Sciences at Rutgers University. He has published research in sociology journals, including a piece on the white middle class youth movement of the 1960s and its relationship with later movements such as the Children of God, the Divine Light Mission, Swami Muktananda and the Revolutionary Youth Movement in Theory and Society. He later co-authored, with Ralph Larkin, a more focused article dealing with Guru Maharaj Ji and his followers, which was published in Sociological Analysis, and a piece dealing with the vocabulary used in these social movements, in Social Text.
Marc Galanter	1931–	Psychiatry	Galanter is director of the division of alcoholism and drug abuse in the department of psychiatry at New York University School of Medicine. He is the editor of Cults and New Religious Movements: A Report of the American Psychiatric Association, and author of Cults: Faith, Healing and Coercion.
Eugene V. Gallagher	1950–	Religious studies	Gallagher is a professor of religious studies at Connecticut College. His department lists his specializations as: History of religion, New religious movements, New Testament and early Christianity, Western scriptures and traditions. He is the author of several books, mainly on the topic of new religious movements. In 1995 Gallagher and James D. Tabor, an associate professor of religious studies at the University of North Carolina, co-authored Why Waco? Cults and the Battle for Religious Freedom in America. The book blamed the 1993 Waco siege partly on misunderstanding of religious issues by law enforcement personnel.
Mattias Gardell	1959–	Religious studies	Gardell is a scholar of comparative religion. He is the current holder of the Nathan Söderblom Chair of Comparative Religion at Uppsala University, Sweden. Gardell specializes in the study of religious extremism and religious racism in the United States, studying groups such as the Ku Klux Klan, the Nation of Islam, and racialist movements in Neopaganism (Odinism). His 1995 dissertation on Louis Farrakhan and the Nation of Islam was published in both British and American editions.
Martin Gardner	1914–2010	Mathematics	Gardner was an American mathematics and science author. He wrote the Mathematical Games column in Scientific American from 1956 to 1981 and the Notes of a Fringe-Watcher column in Skeptical Inquirer from 1983 to 2002 and published over 70 books. He wrote on various new religious movements, including Scientology and Urantia (the topic of his 1995 book published by Prometheus Books).
Ron Geaves	1948–	Religious studies	Geaves is a professor of religion at Liverpool Hope University in England. He has become known by his expertise in the adaptation and transmigration of religions to the West, especially Islam, Sikhism and Hinduism. He is the author of several books, including The Sufis of Britain, which explored the manifestations of Islamic mysticism in the UK and The Continuum Glossary of Religious Terminology an extensive glossary of seven major world faiths. He was one of the earliest Western students of Maharaji (Prem Rawat, known also as Guru Maharaj Ji), and has written a number of papers related to Maharaji and his organizations, such as the Divine Light Mission, and Elan Vital.
Stephen Glazier		Anthropology	Glazier is a member of the graduate faculty in anthropology at the University of Nebraska–Lincoln; where he teaches classes in anthropology, race and minority relations, and sociology of religion. He has conducted extensive fieldwork in Trinidad which focused on Caribbean religions such as Rastafari, Vodoun, and the Spiritual Baptists. He has served as president of the Society for the Anthropology of Consciousness and secretary of the Society for the Scientific Study of Religion.
Andreas Grünschloß	1957–	Religious studies	Grünschloß, professor of religious studies at Göttingen University, is a researcher with a focus on new religious movements (especially UFO religions), Buddhism, syncretism and related topics who has contributed to various encyclopedias, anthologies and scholarly journals. He is also co-editor of the Marburg Journal of Religion.
Jeffrey K. Hadden	1937–2003	Sociology	Hadden was Professor of Sociology and Religious Studies at the University of Virginia, and founder of an internet resource on new religious movements, the Religious Movements Homepage Project.
John R. Hall		Sociology	Hall is professor of sociology at the University of California, Davis. He has authored a book on Jonestown, and apocalyptic new religious movements.
David A. Halperin		Psychiatry	Halperin is a psychiatrist interested in the intersects between religion and psychiatry and psychology. He edited the volume Psychodynamic Perspectives on Religion, Sect, and Cult (1983).
Olav Hammer	1958–	History	Hammer is a professor of History of Religion at the University of Southern Denmark in Odense, with a research focus on the application of critical theory in the context of religious change and innovation.
Graham Harvey	1959–	Religious studies	Harvey specializes in Modern Paganism, indigenous religions, and animism. He wrote books such as Listening People, Speaking Earth: Contemporary Paganism (1997) and What Do Pagans Believe? (2007), and he edited volumes like Paganism Today: Witches, Druids, the Goddess and Ancient Earth Traditions for the Twenty-First Century (with Charlotte Hardman; 1996).
Steven Hassan	1954–	Psychiatry	Hassan formed a method of counseling former members of controversial religious groups, called the Strategic Interaction Approach. In his 2002 book The Psychology of Terrorism, author Chris E. Stout writes that Hassan, "bases his counseling of voluntary cultists on theory and research. To combat destructive mind control, he has developed the Strategic Interaction Approach. This approach is designed to free the cult member from the group's control over his or her life." New York Magazine characterized Hassan as, "one of the country's leading experts on cults and mind control." Steven Hassan is the author of the book Combatting Cult Mind Control, which was recommended by Louis Jolyon West in the American Journal of Psychiatry "to both lay persons who wish to become better informed on this topic and to professionals in health-related fields, clergy, attorneys, judges, and others whose responsibilities bring them into contact with cults, their members, and the families whose lives are affected." and Peter Tyrer MD in The Lancet wrote that it was "well worth reading" for "professionals in mental health, particularly those involved with students." His "Strategic Intervention Therapy: A New Form of Exit Counseling for Cult Members" was published in 1994. Hassan has been described as a "cult expert" by the Reuters, The Toronto Sun, The New York Times, The Globe and Mail, the Herald Sun, and Newsweek. In the book Theorising Religion: Classical and Contemporary Debates edited by James A. Beckford and John Walliss, Hassan is described as a "scholar" belonging to the faction of "cult bashers."
Irving Hexham	1943–	Religious studies	Hexham is professor of religious studies at the University of Calgary, Alberta, Canada. He began his academic research with a study of New Age thought in Glastonbury and continued his research with a study of the origins of the ideology of Apartheid. Later he pioneered the study of the amaNazareta by publishing the complete scriptures of this important African Independent Church which in the past was often considered pagan. Alongside his South African studies Hexham also published extensively on New Religious Movements, Theology, the History of Christian Missions, and, more recently National Socialism.
Titus Hjelm	1974–	Religious studies and sociology	Hjelm is a professor in the study of religion at University of Helsinki (formerly a professor of sociology at University College London). He primarily focuses on Wicca, Satanism, and other neopagan movements in Nordic countries. For example, he published "Between Satan and Harry Potter: Legitimating Wicca in Finland," Journal of Contemporary Religion 21, no. 1 (2006).
Walter Hollenweger	1927–2016	Theology	Hollenweger was a Swiss theologian and author, recognized as an expert on worldwide Pentecostalism. His two best known books are: The Pentecostals (1972) and Pentecostalism: Origins and Developments Worldwide (1997) In 1955 he began studying at the faculty of theology of the University of Zurich. He wrote a ten volume doctoral dissertation Handbuch der Pfingstbewegung (Handbook of the Pentecostal Movement) published in 1966. The core of this work was published in various languages and became a standard work on Pentecostalism. His numerous publications in the years following made him one of the premier interpreters of this movement.
Cynthia Ann Humes	1958–	Religious Studies	Humes is a professor of religious studies at Claremont McKenna College, in Claremont, California. She has spent much time in India to study first-hand the role of goddesses in modern Hinduism, and has also written on Hinduism's influence on new religious movements in the United States. In 2008 she criticized the Transcendental Meditation movement for its seeming misunderstanding of Indian classical music, while in 2005 she had criticized its exclusivity.
Stephen J. Hunt	1954–	Sociology	Hunt is a professor of sociology at the University of the West of England whose primary research interests in the field of alternative religion include the Charismatic movement and the "New" Black Pentecostal Churches.
Ronald Hutton	1953–	History	Hutton is an English historian. Educated at Cambridge and Oxford, he taught history at the University of Bristol in the 1980s. He has written influential books on Neopaganism, Wicca, and related topics.
Massimo Introvigne	1955–	Sociology	Introvigne is the director of the Center for Studies of New Religions (CESNUR) in Turin, Italy; his publications include over thirty books on the history and sociology of religion (among them the Enciclopedia delle religioni in Italia), as well as over a hundred scholarly articles in various languages.
Benton Johnson	1928–	Sociology	Johnson is professor emeritus of sociology at the University of Oregon, former chair of both its sociology department and department of religious studies, and former editor of Journal for the Scientific Study of Religion. He is past president of the Society for the Scientific Study of Religion, the Association for the Sociology of Religion, and The Religious Research Association. His work focuses on church-sect typology, new religious movements and mainline U.S. Protestant denominations.
Danny Jorgensen	1951–	Religious studies	Jorgensen is a professor at the department of religious studies of the University of South Florida is an American professor at the department of religious studies of the University of South Florida, for which he also served as chair from 1999 to 2006. Jorgensen's research interests include Sociology of Culture, Knowledge, and Religion, Science and Religion, Cults and Sects, American religion, Native American religions, new religions, Mormonism, Shakerism, Occultism, Neopaganism, Witchcraft, Scientology, and others.
Jeffrey Kaplan	1954–	Religious studies	Kaplan specializes in race, racism, white supremacy, and their intersections with new religious movements and religion generally. He co-edited with Heléne Lööw a volume named The Cultic Milieu: Oppositional Subcultures in an Age of Globalization (2002).
Alice Beck Kehoe	1934–	Anthropology	Kehoe was professor of anthropology at University of Nebraska and Marquette University, and the author of several books on new religious movements among Native American peoples, including the Ghost Dance.
Stephen A. Kent		Sociology	Kent is a professor in the department of sociology at the University of Alberta in Edmonton, Alberta, Canada. A specialist in alternative religions, he has published research on such groups as the Children of God and Scientology, and has cautioned against downplaying the risks associated with involvement in such groups.
Reender Kranenborg	1942–	Religious studies	Kranenborg was an editor of the magazine Religious Movement in the Netherlands published by the institute of religious studies of the Free University in Amsterdam. He received his PhD in the theological faculty about the subject of self-realization and he has a seat at the Comitato Scientifico (scientific committee) of the CESNUR.
Jeffrey J. Kripal	1962–	Religious studies	Kripal is a professor of religious studies and chair of the department of religious studies at Rice University, Houston, Texas. His areas of interest include the comparative erotics and ethics of mystical literature, American countercultural translations of Asian religions, and the history of Western esotericism from ancient gnosticism to the New Age, including the Ramakrishna Mission, and the Esalen Institute.
Janja Lalich	1945–	Sociology	Lalich is a widely published author and educator who has done work in the area of cults and psychological influence. She is the head of the Cult Recovery and Information Center in Alameda, California.
David C. Lane	1956–	Sociology	Lane is a professor of philosophy and sociology at Mt. San Antonio College, in Walnut, California. He is the author of: The Making of a Spiritual Movement: The Untold Story of Paul Twitchell and Eckankar, The Unknowing Sage:Life and Work of Baba Faqir Chand, and Exposing Cults: When the Skeptical Mind Confronts the Mystical.
Michael Langone	1947–	Psychology	Langone is the executive director of the International Cultic Studies Association (ICSA) and he has written widely on alternative religious movements.
Saul V. Levine	1938–	Psychiatry	Levine is a professor of psychiatry in Toronto, Ontario, Canada. He has researched cults and deprogramming, with work published in the Canadian Journal of Psychiatry, and the Canadian Psychiatric Association Journal.
James R. Lewis	1949–	Philosophy	Lewis, a lecturer in philosophy at the University of Wisconsin, has been a prolific author and editor of books on new religious movements such as The Oxford Handbook of New Religious Movements (2004); he also edits the Brill Handbooks on Contemporary Religion series and is co-editor of Ashgate's Controversial New Religions series.
Robert Jay Lifton	1926–	Psychiatry	Lifton is a psychiatrist who has focused his research in the area of coercive persuasion. He wrote an article on the creation of cults for The Harvard Mental Health Letter, and is the author of Thought Reform and the Psychology of Totalism, and Destroying the World to Save It: Aum Shinrikyo, Apocalyptic Violence, and the New Global Terrorism.
Raphaël Liogier	1967–	Political science	Liogier is the director of the Observatoire du religieux and a professor of universities at the Institut d'études politiques d'Aix-en-Provence and the Institut de management public et de gouvernance territoriale. He co-authored several articles on the theme of religion. Liogier wrote his thesis on Buddhism under the direction of Bruno Étienne, a professor at the Institut d'études politiques d'Aix-en-Provence, and has among other things published a book on secularism in 2006. He works particularly on the issues related to Islam and cults. He has also criticized the "anti-sect" government agency MIVILUDES.
John Lofland	1936–	Sociology	Lofland is a sociologist, professor, and author best known for his studies of the peace movement and for his first book, Doomsday Cult: A Study of Conversion, Proselytization, and Maintenance of Faith which was based on field work among a group of Unification Church members in California in the 1960s. It is considered to be one of the most important and widely cited studies of the process of religious conversion, and one of the first modern sociological studies of a new religious movement. He earned a PhD in sociology the University of California, Berkeley based on his Unification Church study. Since 1970 he has been a professor in the sociology department at the University of California, Davis, where he is now Professor of Sociology Emeritus.
Paul R. Martin	1946–2009	Psychology	A former member of the Great Commission Association of Churches group, Martin was a psychologist and the founder and executive director of the Christian Wellspring Retreat and Resource Center. He consulted with several institutions, published on cult-related subjects, and collaborated in fieldwork focusing on the prediction and treatment of psychological damage related to involvement with high-demand religious movements.
Jean-François Mayer	1957–	History	Mayer is a religious historian and director of the institute Religioscope. He has a doctorate degree in history at the Jean Moulin University Lyon 3 (1984). From 1991 to 1998, he worked as an analyst on international affairs and policy for the Swiss federal government. In 1999, he founded a firm of strategic researches named JFM Recherches et Analyses, and taught at the University of Freiburg from 1999 to 2007. In 2007, Mayer founded the Institute Religioscope and became the director. He contributed in the writing of several magazines, including Politica Hermetica, Religioscope and Religion Watch. His writing focuses on contemporary religious movements and cults, including Islam, Unification Church, the Church of Scientology, the Order of the Solar Temple and the Pilgrims of Arès.
J. Gordon Melton	1942–	Religious studies	Melton is author of, co-author of, or contributor to many standard references and articles on emergent and established religious groups, including the Encyclopedia of American Religions. He is the director of the Institute for the Study of American Religions based in Santa Barbara, California.
Jesse S. Miller	1940–2006	Psychology	Miller taught a course in advanced hypnotherapeutic techniques, at UC Berkeley. Miller specialized in analysis of hypnotherapy.
Timothy Miller	1944–	Religious studies	Miller is a professor and author with a special interest in communalism and new religious movements. He is a professor of religious studies at the University of Kansas at Lawrence. In 1995 his book America's Alternative Religions was published by SUNY Press.
Robin Munro	1952–2021	Jurisprudence	Munro is a legal scholar and author. He received his PhD from the Department of Law, School of Oriental & African Studies, University of London. He has written on new religious movements in China, including Falun Gong and syncretic sects and secret societies.
Richard Ofshe	1941–	Sociology	Ofshe is a widely published author and expert witness who has done work in the area of cultic mind control and the use of hypnosis for recovering repressed memories. He is a professor emeritus of Sociology at the University of California, Berkeley.
Peter A. Olsson	1941–	Psychiatry	Olsson is a psychiatrist affiliated with Baylor College of Medicine, where he is on staff as adjunct clinical professor of psychiatry. He is an assistant professor of psychiatry at Dartmouth Medical School. In his research he has focused on the analysis of the framework and mindset of leaders of destructive cults and religious groups.
Erik A. W. Östling		History of religion	Östling is professor and administrative director of the departments of ethnology, history of religions, and gender studies at the University of Stockholm. He has written works on Raëlism, a major UFO religion, like ""Those who came from the sky": Ancient Astronauts and Creationism in the Raëlian Religion," in Controversial New Religions, edited by James R. Lewis and Jesper Aa. Petersen, 368–82 (Oxford: Oxford University Press, 2014).
Susan J. Palmer	1946–	Sociology	Palmer teaches in Montreal, Quebec as an adjunct professor at Concordia University and as professor of religious studies at Dawson College; she is the author of more than sixty articles as well as the author or editor of eight books on new religious movements.
Jesper Aagaard Petersen		Religious studies	Petersen is a professor of Social and Educational Sciences at the Norwegian University of Science and Technology, specializing in religious education. He co-authored The Invention of Satanism (2016) with James R. Lewis and Asbjørn Dyrendal.
Karla Poewe	1941–	Anthropology	Poewe is an anthropologist and historian. She is the author of ten academic books and fifty peer-reviewed articles in international journals. Currently Poewe is professor emeritus in anthropology at the University of Calgary, Calgary, Alberta, Canada, and Adjunct Research Professor at Liverpool Hope University, Liverpool, England. She is married to Irving Hexham. Poewe and Hexham co-authored Understanding Cults and New Religions (1986) and New Religions as Global Cultures (1997).
Margaret Poloma	1943–	Sociology	Poloma is a professor and author who is known for her research on the Pentecostal movement in American Christianity. She is now professor emeritus at the University of Akron.
Jennifer E. Porter		Religious studies	Porter is a professor of religious studies at Memorial University of Newfoundland. She specializes in religion and popular culture, but occasionally writes on Spiritualism.
Adam Possamai	1970–	Sociology	Possamai is currently co-director of the Religion and Society Research Centre at the University of Western Sydney. He was the 2002–2007 co-editor of the Australian Religion Studies Review and president of the sociology of religion section (RC22) of the International Sociological Association from 2010 to 2014. He has published research on the Church of All Worlds, the Church of Satan, Jediism, and other new religious movements.
Susan Raine		Sociology	Raine is an associate professor at MacEwan University. She specializes in UFO religions, new religious movements, conspiracy theory, and paranormality. She co-edited with Stephen Kent the volume Scientology in Popular Culture: Influences and Struggles for Legitimacy (2017).
James T. Richardson	1941–	Sociology	Richardson has done work in the area of minority religions and connections between law and religion. He directs the Grant Sawyer Center for Justice Studies at the University of Nevada (Reno).
Thomas Robbins	1943–2015	Sociology	Robbins was an independent scholar affiliated with the Santa Barbara Centre for Humanistic Studies; trained at Harvard University and the University of North Carolina, he has held teaching and research appointments at Queens College, the New School for Social Research, Yale University and the Graduate Theological Union and is a leading contributor of social scientific literature on new religious movements.
Mikael Rothstein	1961–	History	Rothstein is an associate professor of religious history at the University of Copenhagen, Denmark. In 2002 he was on the board of the Danish Association for the History of Religions (DAHR) and the editorial boards of the publications Renner Studies on New Religions (Aarhus University Press) and Nye Religioner (Gyldendal). He is the author of several books on religious history and especially on the role of new religious movements, among them: Belief Transformations: Some Aspects of the Relationship between Science and Religion in Transcendental Meditation (TM) and the International Society for Krishna Consciousness (ISKCON) (1996), Secular Theories on Religion: Current Perspectives (2000) (co-author with Tim Jensen), New Age Religion and Globalization (2002), and New Religions in a Postmodern World (2003) (co-editor with Reender Kranenborg)
John A. Saliba	1937–	Religious studies	Saliba is professor of religious studies at the University of Detroit Mercy as well as a Catholic priest and a Jesuit. He advocates a conciliatory approach towards new religious movements, arguing that "dialogue is more useful than diatribe." He notes that for most people membership in a NRM is temporary, and maintains that NRMs can act as a temporary safe haven for young adults, enabling them to stabilise their lives. He is critical of the anti-cult movement and has remarked that "the neutral stance of the social sciences is a stance which has often been interpreted as favoring the NRMs."
Ferdinando Sardella	1960–	History of religion	Ferdinando Sardella is a Swedish scholar of history of religions, Hinduism, and religious studies, the former director and coordinator of the Forum for South Asia Studies at Uppsala University. His areas of interest and specialization are: modern Hinduism, Buddhism, religions in South Asia (from both a local and a global perspective), new religious movements, religion and science, medieval bhakti movements, Bengali and Sanskrit studies, the history and sociology of religion, interreligious dialogue, comparative religion, globalization and postcolonial theory. Sardella obtained a PhD degree in 2010 at his alma mater on Bhaktisiddhanta Sarasvati, a prominent Bengali proponent of the bhakti tradition of Gaudiya Vaisnavism in the 20th century and founder of a movement called the Gaudiya Math.
Larry Shinn	1942–	Religious studies	Shinn is president of Berea College, Kentucky. Prior to this appointment he was vice-president of academic affairs, dean of humanities and head of the religious studies department at Bucknell University, US. He has studied ISKCON in America for more than forty years and, among his other writings, published, The Dark Lord, a study of the Hare Krishnas and the cult controversy. He is also a United Methodist minister. He is notable for accepting the bona fides of the ISKCON even before a majority of academia accepted their (ISKCON's) traditional and orthodox nature.
Anson D. Shupe	1948–2021	Sociology	Shupe was a professor of sociology at the joint campus of Indiana State University-Purdue University at Fort Wayne, Indiana. He has done fieldwork on a number of new religious movements, in particular the Unification Church, and has also studied the anti-cult movement; he and David G. Bromley became "the primary social science interpreters of that countermovement in a series of books and articles."
Mark Silk	1951–	Religious studies	Silk is a professor of religion in public life at Trinity College (Hartford, Connecticut). In the 1980s and 1990s Silk was a regular contributor to The New York Times, contributing essays and book reviews on feminist theology, new religious movements, Jewish identity, and other religion-related topics. In 1995 he criticized the American news media for their unbalanced coverage of new religious movements when compared to more established religious institutions.
Margaret Singer	1921–2003	Psychology	Singer was professor emeritus in the University of California at Berkeley's department of psychology. She had published widely on cultic groups, coercion, pseudo-therapudic practices, and other areas, including brainwashing theories, of which she was a strong proponent. She sat as an advisory board member for anti-cult groups the Cult Awareness Network and the International Cultic Studies Association (ICSA).
Frederick Sontag	1924–2009	Philosophy	Sontag, an author and professor of philosophy at Pomona College, was considered an expert on the Unification Church. In the 1970s he interviewed church founder Sun Myung Moon and church members in Europe, America, and Asia while researching for a book published in 1977.
Stephen J. Stein	1940–2022	History of religion	Stephen Joseph Stein was an American academic, author, and educator focused on religion in the United States. He was the Chancellor's Professor Emeritus of Religious Studies at Indiana University in Bloomington, Indiana, and served as President of the American Society of Church History. His notable writings on new religious movements include The Shaker Experience in America (1992), Alternative American Religious (2000), and Communities of Dissent (2003).
Diana Tumminia		Religious studies and sociology	Tumminia is a professor of sociology at California State University, Sacramento. She has written works like When Prophecy Never Fails: Myth and Reality in a Flying-Saucer Group (2005) on the UFO religion Unaris.
Jan van der Lans	1933–2002	Psychology	Van der Lans was a Dutch professor in the psychology of religion at the Catholic University of Nijmegen (now called Radboud University Nijmegen). From 1977 onwards he did research among followers of new religious movements. In 1979 he instigated a European platform of psychologists of religion and until 1997 he was chairperson of the International Committee of European Psychologists of Religion. In 1992 he became a professor in the psychology of religion at the university. Van der Lans was involved in the International Association for the Psychology of Religion (German: Internationale Gesellschaft für Religionspsychologie) and as of 1998 part of its executive committee. He was also a member of the Commission Internationale de Psychologie Religieuse Scientifique.
Roy Wallis	1945–1990	Sociology	Wallis was a sociologist and Dean of the Faculty of Economics and Social Sciences at the Queen's University Belfast. He is mostly known for his creation of the seven signs that differentiate a religious congregation from a sectarian church, which he created while researching the Scientology church. After publishing his book The Road to Total Freedom, an in-depth analysis of the sociology of Scientology, he was harassed by the church both legally and personally. Forged letters, apparently from Wallis, were sent to his colleagues implicating him in various scandalous activities. He introduced the distinction between world-affirming and world-rejecting new religious movements.
Margit Warburg	1952–	Sociology	Warburg is a professor at the University of Copenhagen's department of history of religions. She specializes in the sociology of religion with emphasis on emergent religious sects and religious minorities. She has written extensively on the effect of technology on religion and new religious movements.
James Webb	1946–1980	History	James Charles Napier Webb was an historian and biographer. He was born in Edinburgh, was educated at Harrow and Trinity College, Cambridge. He is remembered primarily for two works The Occult Underground and The Occult Establishment. Webb traced the influence of occult and mystical groups and writers on literature, philosophy and politics.
Catherine Wessinger	1952–	Religious studies	Wessinger is a professor of religious studies at Loyola University New Orleans with a main research focus on millennialism, new religions, women and religion and religions of India. Wessinger is co-general editor of Nova Religio: The Journal of Alternative and Emergent Religions and served as a consultant to federal law enforcement during the Montana Freemen standoff.
Louis Jolyon West	1924–1999	Psychiatry	West was a psychiatrist affiliated with University of California, Los Angeles. He held positions of professor and chairman at the Department of Psychiatry and Biobehavioral Sciences at UCLA. He contributed research on cults to publications including the Comprehensive Textbook of Psychiatry, and Cults and New Religious Movements: A Report of the American Psychiatric Association. West served on the advisory board of the Cult Awareness Network.
Harriet Whitehead		Anthropology	Whitehead wrote Renunciation and Reformation: A Study of Conversion in an American Sect (1987) as an anthropological study of Scientology.
Bryan R. Wilson	1926–2004	Sociology	Wilson was reader emeritus in sociology and an emeritus fellow of All Souls College at Oxford. He taught at Oxford for over 30 years, and was visiting professor at various universities worldwide. He was honorary president of the International Society for the Sociology of Religion. His work was in the typology of sects, the secularization of religious groups, and relationships between minority groups and governments.
Diane Winston	1951–	Media and Religion	Winston is a professor of Media and Religion at the Annenberg School for Communication and Journalism at the University of Southern California (USC). USC lists her current research interests as media coverage of Islam, religion and new media, and the place of religion in American identity. She received her B.A. from Brandeis, a master's in theological studies from Harvard Divinity School, a master's in journalism from Columbia, and her PhD in religion from Princeton University. She has extensively studied the history of the Salvation Army.
Benjamin Zablocki	1941–2020	Sociology	Zablocki was the head of the sociology department at Rutgers University. He has published on communes, leadership roles in new religious movements, and the academic debates regarding brainwashing and methodology in the study of new religion.
Benjamin E. Zeller		Religious studies	Zeller specializes in American new religious movements and religion's relationship with science and culture. He wrote Heaven's Gate: America's UFO Religion (2014) and Prophets and Protons: New Religious Movements and Science in Late Twentieth-Century America (2010).

== See also ==
- Cognitive science of new religious movements
- Sociological classifications of religious movements
- Sociology of religion
