= Cult Controversies: The Societal Response to New Religious Movements =

1985 nonfiction book on cults

- Author: James A. Beckford
- Language: English
- Genre: nonfiction
- Publisher: Tavistock Publications
- Publication date: 1985
- Pages: 335
- ISBN: 9780422796408
- OCLC: 180494416

Cult Controversies: The Societal Response to New Religious Movements is a 1985 nonfiction book by James A. Beckford on the reaction to new religious movements (cults) in America, Britain, France, and Germany. It was published by Tavistock Publications in London and New York. Beckford covers the literature and sources on various new religious movements (NRMs) in various places, but also the various reactions that non-NRM members had to their sudden presence in different societies, including America, Britain, France, Germany, and Japan.

== Reception ==
James T. Richardson for Review of Religious Research calls the book a "valuable contribution to the literature on new religions, social movements, and social control". E. Burke Rochford for Social Forces agrees that the book is a valuable contribution, but believes that the uniqueness of the theoretical approach is overstated by Beckford. Thomas Robbins for the Journal for the Scientific Study of Religion says the book "manifests the 'English' style characterized by a relentlessly sociological problematic and absence of any hint of special pleading either for cults or 'cult victims'".

Irving Hexham for Sociological Analysis argues that the work raises issues that deserve more attention than the work actually provides, and the book does not provide a coherent whole for the study of new religious movements and opposition to them. Stuart A. Wright for the Journal of Church and State believes that Beckford's effort to document church-state issues in particular both "laudable and debatable". Daniel Regan for Contemporary Sociology applauds the book but finds shortcomings in its comparative analysis of societal responses to NRMs, its occasion lack of references and proper sourcing, and the price for the cloth edition (listed as US$39.95).
