= Combating Cult Mind Control =

Book by Steven Hassan

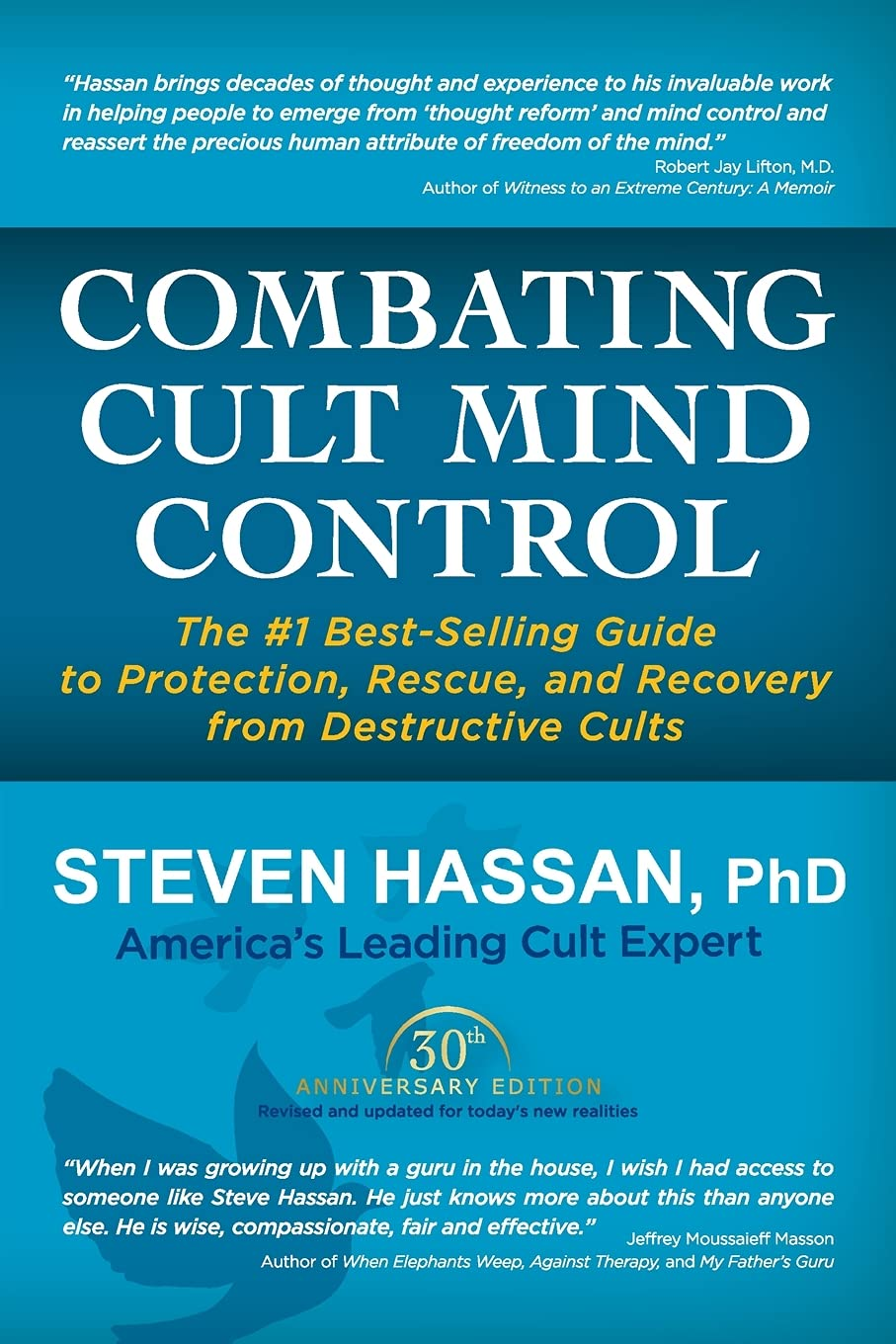
- Book cover
- Author: Steven Hassan
- Language: English
- Series: Freedom of Mind Press
- Subject: Cults, mind control
- Genre: Non-fiction
- Publisher: Park Street Press
- Publication date: 1988
- Publication place: United States
- Media type: Print (Hardcover)
- Pages: 256 pp
- ISBN: 0-89281-243-5
- OCLC: 18382426
- Dewey Decimal: 306/.1 19
- LC Class: BP603 .H375 1988
- Followed by: Releasing the Bonds: Empowering People to Think for Themselves, 2000

Combating Cult Mind Control is a nonfiction book by Steven Hassan, first published in 1988. The book presents itself as a guide to resisting the mind control practices of destructive cults, and focuses on the research of Margaret Singer and Robert Lifton as well as the cognitive dissonance theory of Leon Festinger. Hassan published a revised edition in 2015 which updated information on organizations that he alleges practice mind control and use social media to increase their influence.

== Summary ==
In the preface, Hassan directly addresses readers who know someone in a cult or may be in a cult themselves. He stresses that everyone needs to decide for themselves whether they are in a destructive cult and that if their group is not a mind control cult, it will stand up to criticism and examination.

In the introduction, Hassan expresses discomfort with the term "deprogramming" because, though still widely considered positive by the public, it evokes images of kidnapping cult members against their will, which he no longer supports except in extreme cases. Hassan views another term, "exit counseling," has its own pros and cons. While it is more voluntary, cults also warn their members against exit counseling, and the "exit" can turn off cult members who do not think they are ready to leave the destructive cult yet. In the United Kingdom, exit counseling can refer to someone who aids in end of life care, another point of confusion. Though he is uncomfortable with both terms, Hassan admits he does not have a better replacement and uses both throughout the book.

=== Changes in later editions ===
In the 2018 30th Anniversary Edition, Hassan changed many instances of mind control to "undue influence." Though this emerged as a legal term, he finds it more helpful because efforts to change the minds of cult members are often not fully effective and much more easily thought of as a type of pressure or influence that makes individuals more likely to agree with cult doctrine than disagree.

Additionally, Hassan adds stories of Mormon and Scientology ex-members, which previous editions had strayed away from for fear of litigation. He notes that, because previous editions did not describe Mormonism or Scientology as destructive cults, the book was not banned by those groups and many members were able to read it.

The 30th anniversary edition begins with Hassan describing his own membership in the Unification Church and eventually deprogramming.

=== Cult structure ===
Hassan categorizes cults into four groups: religious, political, psychotherapy/educational, and commercial. Most cults have five types of members, depending on their commitment to the cult: top leaders, sub leaders, core members, rank and file members, and fringe members.

Hassan defines mind control as "a system that disrupts an individual's healthy identity development." Identities are composed of beliefs, behavior, thoughts, and patterns of emotions. When cults indoctrinate a member, they replace this authentic identity with an artificial one. According to Hassan, while this can happen quickly, it generally takes days or weeks and can occur even if, at first, the individual fakes the cult identity in order to fit in, without actually believing in cult doctrine.

According to Hassan, modern cults use mind control techniques like neuro-linguistic programming (NLP) and hypnosis to recruit members. Their recruitment techniques continue to improve over time and they now no longer target mostly college. Hassan does not use mind control and brainwashing as synonyms. Instead, he uses brainwashing as a specific type of destructive mind control.

Hassan's four components of mind control are: behavior, information, thought, and emotion. According to his BITE model, if a destructive cult can effectively control one or more components, the others will tend to follow. For instance, restricting information can lead to control of thoughts, which can in turn lead to changed and controlled behaviors and emotions. His BITE model is based on Leon Festinger's cognitive dissonance theory, though Hassan added information as a fourth realm of control.

Hassan claims there are three steps to gaining control of someone's mind: unfreezing, changing, and refreezing. Unfreezing means "breaking a person down," changing is when indoctrination is introduced, and refreezing means building someone's new artificial cult identity. According to Hassan, the most important part of refreezing is the denigration of the past self. Cult members must not want to return to their old lives and old identity. This may include giving up on their old hobbies, friends and family, often in a public setting, and confessing their sins to the group. Members may have distorted memories during this phase. Cults often pair new recruits with more seasoned members, instructing the new ones to imitate the older ones in all things. In this phase, cults may use outside cues like a new name, clothes, or language to cement the new identity. New members are also quickly converted into recruiters, as convincing people to believe something actually cements one's own belief in the same thing.

== Reception ==
The book has been reviewed in the American Journal of Psychiatry. Louis Jolyon West writes:

One is impressed by Hassan's candor in describing his experiences both within the Unification Church and after his departure from it, especially his work as an exit counselor. Beyond its value as an illuminating personal account, this book is an informative and practical guide to cult-related issues. It is recommended both to lay persons who wish to become better informed on this topic and to professionals in health-related fields, clergy, attorneys, judges, and others whose responsibilities bring them into contact with cults, their members, and the families whose lives are affected.

Stephen Barrett, writing for the National Council Against Health Fraud Newsletter, described the book as an "insightful look at the bizarre and dangerous world of cults". Marcia R. Rudin described Hassan's book as a good revision of his previous work, especially the addition of "valuable" personal anecdotes from Hassan himself.

Robert E. Schecter describes Combating Cult Mind Control as a "jargon-free explanation of the nature and effects of mind control" and a "serviceable set of guidelines" about how to assist exiting cults, but he argues that Hassan left out important details such as how "push" factors influence one's vulnerability to being recruited in a cult.

Colorado state counselor Dr. Cathleen A. Mann said Hassan's BITE model "is borrowed material from a 30 year long tradition of social psychological research." She also noted that Hassan himself works for a for-profit, anti-cult institute, as opposed to a non-profit one, and opted to self-publish (through his company's publishing house) Combating Cult Mind Control instead of seeking a more traditional route.

John B. Brown II of the "Pagan Unity Campaign" suggests that Hassan's statement that he had "decided not to participate in forcible interventions, believing it was imperative to find another approach" (p. 114) is contradicted by the statement in the 1988 edition that "Forcible intervention can be kept as a last resort if all other attempts fail."

According to Douglas Cowan, the book utilizes a language opposing "freedom" and "captivity", based on the conceptual framework of brainwashing and thought control, and the alleged abuses of civil liberties and human rights. He writes that these are the precipitating motivation for secular anti-cultists such as Hassan.

Irving Hexham, professor of religious studies at the University of Calgary, writes that Hassan's description of destructive cults (page 37), as "a group which violates the rights of its members and damages them through the abusive techniques of unethical mind control" is not helpful. According to Hexham, "the problem with definitions like this is that they raise more problems than they solve. Before we can decide whether a group is a cult or not, we must first define 'rights,' 'abusive techniques,' and 'mind control.' Hassan attempts to do this, but his explanations are not very helpful."

== See also ==
- Anti-cult movement
- Brainwashing
- List of cult and new religious movement researchers
