= James Beckford =

James Beckford may refer to:

- James Beckford (athlete) (born 1975), Jamaican long jumper
- James A. Beckford (1942–2022), British sociologist of religion
