= Cognitive science of new religious movements =

Religious studies

Cognitive science of new religious movements is the study of new religious movements (NRMs) from the perspective of cognitive science. The field employs methods and theories from a variety of disciplines, including cognitive science of religion, sociology of religion, scientific study of religion, anthropology, and artificial life. Scholars in the field seek to explain the origin and evolution of new religious movements in terms of ordinary universal cognitive processes.

== History ==
The field traces its roots to the beginnings of the field of cognitive science of religion in the 1990s, especially in Harvey Whitehouse's work on 'cargo cults' in Papua New Guinea and cognitivist work by sociologists of religion William Sims Bainbridge and Rodney Stark.

In a 2005 article titled "Towards a Cognitive Science of New Religious Movements", Afzal Upal conceptualized the field and proposed agent-based social simulation as a good complement for Whitehouse's anthropological approach to investigate the origin of new religious movements. Upal developed an information entrepreneurship model-based social simulation to study the origin and evolution of new religious movements.

In 2008, Kimmo Ketola used an anthropological case study of Bhaktivedanta Swami Prabhupāda (1896–1977), the founder of the International Society for Krishna Consciousness (ISKCON, the Hare Krishna movement) to identify the cognitive processes that underlie religious charisma. In 2013, building on Whitehouse's work, Olav Hammer studied the transmission of new age religious ideas in the West and identified the contexts that allow them to flourish.

In a series of publications, Upal revised the classic cognitive science of religion account of counterintuitiveness to emphasize the role of context and developed the context-based model of minimal counterintuitiveness. Using this generalized model, Upal argued that novelty of a new religious movement's doctrine gives it memorability advantages over more traditional religious ideas and thus explain constant religious innovation. He carried out an in-depth case study of the origin of the Ahmadiyya Muslim Jama'at to highlight how such a cognitive approach can help explain the origin and evolution of new religious movements.

In a 2009 article, Justin Lane applied Todd Tremlin’s account of an "Agency Detection Device" mental mechanism to the study of small and innovating religious groups.

In a psychological study of members of a variety of new religious movements in Belgium, Coralie Buxant, Vassilis Saroglou, Stefania Casalfiore, and Louis-Léon Christians from the Centre for Psychology of Religion at the Université Catholique de Louvain found that "the pattern of results fit well with what we know from psychology of conversion in general."

Alistair Lockhart (2020) carried out the first extensive overview of the field of cognitive science of new religious movements, concluding that the study of cognitive science of religion as applied to new religious movements and quasi-religions shows more common themes than is typically assumed.

== See also ==
- Academic study of new religious movements
- Cognitive science of religion
- Cognitive science
