= Saul V. Levine =

Canadian psychiatrist and author (born 1938)

- Born: 1938 (age 87–88); Canada
- Known for: The Child in the City; Radical Departures
- Scientific career
- Fields: psychiatry, medicine, cults, new religious movements
- Workplaces: Sunnybrook Medical Center; University of Toronto

Saul V. Levine (born 1938) is a Canadian psychiatrist and author, professor emeritus at various universities for psychiatry at University of California, San Diego, School of Medicine; Stanford University Medical School; and University of Toronto (1970–1993). He was chairman of the Department of Psychiatry at Rady Children’s Hospital, San Diego, from 1993–2011. He was department head of psychiatry at Sunnybrook Medical Center in Toronto, Ontario, Canada.

== Author ==
Levine is the author of several books, including Radical Departures: Desperate Detours to Growing Up, The Child in the City, Youth and Contemporary Religious Movements: Psychosocial Findings, and Tell Me It's Only a Phase!: A Guide for Parents of Teenagers.

Levine's book Radical Departures is cited in The Canadian Encyclopedia article on new religious movements:

University of Toronto psychiatrist Saul V. Levine made a study of deprogramming in his book Radical Departures (1984). He concluded that as a means of changing people's views it was not only a failure but positively dangerous. These conclusions were supported by other scholars who provided civil libertarians, religious leaders in established churches and members of new religions with evidence against the practice of deprogramming. As a result it gradually fell into disrepute.

== Publications ==
=== Books ===
- Dear Doctor, 1987, ISBN 0688070957
- Tell Me It's Only a Phase! A Guide for Parents of Teenagers, Olympic Marketing Corp., June 1987, ISBN 0-13-903147-2, ISBN 978-0-13-903147-2
- Radical Departures: Desperate Detours to Growing Up, March 1986, Harvest Books, ISBN 0-15-675799-0, ISBN 978-0-15-675799-7
- The Child in the City, June 1979, University of Toronto Press, ISBN 0-8020-6337-3, ISBN 978-0-8020-6337-3
- Youth and Contemporary Religious Movements: Psychosocial Findings, 1976, Canadian Psychiatric Association, ASIN B0007AZZLC

=== Articles ===
- "Alienated Jewish Youth and Religious Seminaries—An Alternative to Cults?", Saul L. Levine, Adolescence, v19 n73 p183-99 Spring 1984
- "Youth and Contemporary Religious Movements: Psychosocial Findings", Saul V. Levine & Nancy E. Salter, 21(6) Canadian Psychology Association Journal 411-20 1976
- "Radical Departures", Saul V. Levine, Psychology Today, August 1984, 27.
- "Brief Psychotherapy with Children: A Preliminary Report", Alan J. Rosenthal and Saul V. Levine, Am. J. Psychiatry 1970 127: 646–651
- "Brief Psychotherapy with Children: Process of Therapy", Alan J. Rosenthal, M.D., Assistant Professor, Department of Psychiatry, Stanford University Medical Center, Stanford, Calif. 94305, Saul V. Levine, M.D., Assistant Professor, Department of Psychiatry, University of Toronto, Staff Psychiatrist, the Hospital for Sick Children, Toronto, Ontario, Canada, Am. J. Psychiatry 128:141–146, August 1971, American Psychiatric Association
- "Life in the Cults" in Cults and New Religious Movements: A Report of the American Psychiatric Association, ed. Marc Galanter (Washington DC: American Psychiatric Association, 1989).
- "The Urban Commune: Fact or Fad, Promise or Pipe Dream", Saul V. Levine, et al., 1971, Toronto University, ERIC #: ED067571
- "Teenage Sexuality and Sex Education: Identifying Problems and Solutions", S. Ziegler, V. Young, S.V. Levine – 1984 – Centre for Urban and Community Studies, University of Toronto

== See also ==
- List of cult and new religious movement researchers
- Sociological classifications of religious movements
