= Beth Gylys =

American poet and professor

- Born: Beth Ann Gylys; 1964 (age 61–62); Passaic, New Jersey, U.S.
- Education: Allegheny College, BA; Syracuse University, MA; University of Cincinnati, PhD
- Occupations: Poet, Professor of English and Creative Writing
- Spouse: Thomas Forsthoefel

Beth Ann Gylys (born 1964 Passaic, New Jersey) is a poet and professor of English and Creative Writing at Georgia State University. She has published eight poetry collections, three of which have won awards.

== Early life and education ==
Gylys grew up in Pittsburgh, Pennsylvania, and graduated from Allegheny College with a bachelor's degree in 1986. She went on to receive a master's degree from Syracuse University and a Ph.D. in English and Creative Writing from University of Cincinnati. She has also attended the Stonecoast Writers Conference in Portland, Maine.

== Career ==
Gylys formerly taught at Mercyhurst College in Erie, Pennsylvania. She is currently a professor of English and Creative Writing at Georgia State University. Her poems have appeared in The Paris Review, The Southern Review, The Kenyon Review, The New Republic, The Antioch Review, and The Columbia Review.

She received a MacDowell Colony fellowship in 2001. In 2023 Georgia State University received a Mellon Foundation grant to start a literary journal called Beyond Bars. Gylys is the principal investigator for the project which connects incarcerated individuals can contribute writings and artwork for the journal. The journal's board includes four graduate students and three incarcerated students.

=== Events ===
Gylys' poem "Erratic Gardener" was featured on an episode of Garrison Keillor's A Prairie Home Companion in 1999. Her book of personal ads, titled Matchbook, has been set to music by composer Dan Welcher. She was a featured guest poet at the January 2013 meeting of the Georgia Poetry Society.

== Personal life ==
She is married to Thomas Forsthoefel who is Professor of Religious Studies at Mercyhurst College and the Erie County, PA, Poet Laureate.

== Awards ==
- Quentin R. Howard Award for Balloon Heart
- Gerald Cable Book Award for Bodies that Hum
- The Ohio State University Press/The Journal Award in Poetry for Spot in the Dark

== Works ==
=== Collections of poems ===
- Balloon Heart, Wind Publications, 1997, ISBN 978-0-9636545-8-8
- Bodies that Hum, Silverfish Review Press, 1999, ISBN 978-1-878851-12-3
- Spot in the Dark, Ohio State University Press, 2004, ISBN 978-0-8142-0981-3
- Matchbook, La Vita Poetica Press, 2007, ISBN 0-9786159-3-X
- Sky Blue Enough to Drink, Grayson Books, 2016, ISBN 978-0996280921
- Body Braille, Iris Press, 2020, ISBN 978-1-60454-260-8
- The Conversation Turns to Wide-Mouth Jars, with Cathy Carlisi and Jennifer Wheelock, Kelsay Books, 2022, ISBN 978-1639801541
- After My Father: A Book of Odes, Dancing Girl Press, 2024

=== Anthology appearances ===
- Anthology of Best Magazine Verse (1996)
- American Poetry: the Next Generation, Gerald Costanzo, Jim Daniels Eds, Carnegie Mellon University Press, 2000, ISBN 978-0-88748-337-0
- "Beyond the Map Edge", Under the Rock Umbrella: Contemporary American Poets from 1951–1977, Editor William J. Walsh, Mercer University Press, 2006, ISBN 978-0-88146-047-6
- "Preference", The best American erotic poems: from 1800 to the present, Editor David Lehman, Scribner Poetry, 2008, ISBN 978-1-4165-3745-8
- "Not an Affair, a Sestina" and "The Scene" were included in The Incredible Sestina Anthology, Editor Daniel Nester, Write Bloody Publishing, 2013, ISBN 978-1938912368
- Let Me Say This: A Dolly Parton Poetry Anthology, Madville Publishing, 2023 ISBN 978-1-956440-51-5
