= International Society for the Sociology of Religion =

The International Society for the Sociology of Religion (ISSR), also known as the Société Internationale de Sociologie des Religions (SISR), arose in 1989 from the International Conference on Sociology of Religion (Conférence Internationale de Sociologie Religieuse), founded in 1948. It is a bilingual (French/English) organization, which plays an important role in fostering international contacts between sociologists of religion, mainly through biennial conferences held in various countries. It publishes papers from these conferences as special issues of the journal Social Compass, on whose editorial board the association's past president plays a role. It currently has over 500 members from 47 countries and all the habitable continents. Past presidents of the society include James A. Beckford, Karel Dobbelaere, Bryan R. Wilson, Enzo Pace, and Jean-Paul Willaime. Its current president is Peter Beyer, from the University of Ottawa, Canada.

The Conference on Sociology of Religion from which the society arose was originally created to bring Catholic clerks together to discuss progresses made in sociological research of Catholicism, such as its integration to the society. As of the early 1960s, many participants were Jesuit academics, mostly from Italy, Belgium, Spain and France, with a smaller number from outside of Western Europe. Proceedings from the conferences were published in the (then) Catholic journal of Social Compass.

The organization dropped its religious affiliation at its 10th conference in 1969, and two years later revised its statutes to emphasize its scientific mission. It emphasized its sociological focus, taking as objectives: "a) to promote throughout the world relations between sociologists and, more generally, between specialists of the various disciplines concerned with the object of the Association; and b) to organize periodical international conferences.”

== See also ==
- Association for the Sociology of Religion
- International Sociological Association
