= Steven Hassan =

American mental health professional, writer

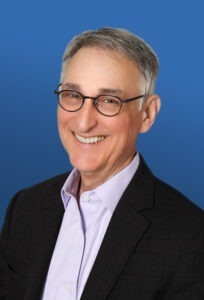
- Hassan in 2023
- Born: Flushing, Queens, New York, USA
- Education: PhD, MA, MEd, LMHC
- Alma mater: Queens College, City University of New York; Cambridge College; Fielding Graduate University
- Occupations: Mental health counselor, author, lecturer
- Writing career
- Subjects: Psychotherapy, Brainwashing, cults
- Website: freedomofmind.com

Steven Alan Hassan (pronounced /hæsən/) is an American mental health professional and author who specializes in the area of cults. In his early career, in the late 1970s, he participated in deprogramming, but since then has advocated non-coercive exit counseling.

Hassan has written four books on the subject of mind control and is often described in the media as an expert on mind control and cults. Hassan's view of undue influence in such groups is echoed by some scholars with backgrounds in psychology and psychiatry. Some researchers in the sociology of religion are critical of his application of mind-control theory to what they characterise as new religious movements (NRM).

Hassan is a former member of the Unification Church. He founded Ex-Moon Inc. in 1979. In 1999, he founded the Freedom of Mind Resource Center.

== Early life and Unification Church ==
Hassan was raised in a Jewish family in Queens, New York. At age 19, while pursuing a poetry degree at Queens College, Hassan was recruited into the Unification Church, and was a member for 2 1/2 years.

Hassan was involved in recruiting, fundraising, and political campaigning for the Unification Church of the United States. He was "a former Unification Church high official" and "a national leader of CARP" (Collegiate Association for the Research of Principles, the Unification Church's campus organization). He described living in communal housing and sleeping less than four hours a night. He said that he believed President Richard Nixon was the Archangel and that, during the Watergate scandal, he and other members of the church engaged in prayer and fasting to "prove their loyalty to the president". He surrendered his bank account to the Unification Church, and quit college and his job to work for the organization. Hassan said that "he was ready to kill or die for" Sun Myung Moon. His membership in the church concerned and confused his family.

In 1976, after working for two full days without sleep, Hassan fell asleep while driving, resulting in a serious automobile crash that required medical care. Hassan's parents hired "deprogrammers" who seized him from his sister's home and took him to an apartment. After five days of isolation and intensive deprogramming, Hassan became convinced that he had been "brainwashed" by the church. Feeling shame at his gullibility and guilt for his recruitment of others, he decided to "dedicate his life to studying cults and developing strategies to help their members escape." Hassan returned to his Jewish faith after leaving the Unification Church.

== Career ==
=== Institutions ===
In 1999 Hassan founded the Freedom of Mind Resource Center. The center is registered as a domestic profit corporation in the Commonwealth of Massachusetts, and Hassan is its president and treasurer. Hassan posts dossiers on the site about organizations he has investigated or received complaints about.

=== Exit counseling ===
Hassan took part in some deprogrammings of others in the late 1970s, but has been critical of them since 1980 and has instead advocated exit counseling. Hassan's preferred approach, exit counseling, is also a form of family-initiated intervention, but distinguishes itself by allowing the subject to leave at any time and by adopting a non-violent, persuasive approach. In Combatting Cult Mind Control (1988), Hassan writes that although "the non-coercive approach will not work in every case, it has proved to be the option most families prefer. Forcible intervention can be kept as a last resort if all other attempts fail."

Michael Langone, a psychologist and advocate for exit counseling, questions Hassan's humanistic counseling approach in a 1995 work. According to Langone, Hassan's "Strategic Intervention Therapy" operates on the assumption that, deep down, all members of "mind control groups" want to get out of the group. In the context of family intervention, the "counselor knows best what the cultist really wants" approach contains the risk of the counselor "manipulating the cultist from point A ("I'll talk to you because my family requested it") to point B ("I want to leave the cult") while mistakenly believing that he is helping the cultist "grow"." For Langone, the fact that the counselor's assistance has in no way been sought by the subject casts further doubt on the ethical propriety of such manipulation.

Although exit counseling models like Hassan's emphasise the voluntary nature of the procedure, Shupe questioned in 2011 how willing the NRM member can be when: (i) they are not actually the client of the counselor (who has been hired by others), and (ii) they are not aware that the counselor's primary, preconceived purpose is to convince them to abandon their faith.

=== Education and writing ===
In 1985 Hassan completed a Master's degree in counseling psychology at Cambridge College. Hassan studied hypnosis and is a member of the International Society of Hypnosis. In Combatting Cult Mind Control he describes his own recruitment as the result of the unethical use of powerful psychological influence techniques by members of the church.

Hassan spent several years developing and promoting a model to evaluate cults and cult-like groups. In his third book, Freedom of Mind: Helping Loved Ones Leave Controlling People, Cults, and Beliefs (2012), Hassan presents Lifton's and Margaret Singer's models of evaluation alongside his own model represented by the acronym "BITE": control of Behavior, Information, Thought and Emotion.

Hassan's view of the dangers of charismatic leadership is echoed by some scholars with backgrounds in psychology and psychiatry, such as Robert Jay Lifton and Anthony Storr, who raise serious questions about the potential for harm in groups controlled by leaders with pathological personality traits. While acknowledging the validity of the concern, Religious Studies Professor Eugene V. Gallagher is critical of the lack of specificity as to when such questions might appropriately be raised. He argues that theorists like Hassan take well-founded suspicion of some manipulative religious leaders and generalize it into a mind control ideology applicable to all cult leaders and cult members. According to Gallagher, such generalization cultivates mistrust of all non-conventional religious leaders and groups, and disregards the great variety of leadership forms found in new religions.

Sociologists Anson D. Shupe and David G. Bromley, who disagree with Hassan and the anti-cult movement, have criticized his work. Shupe writes that he was creating "a moral crusade" as that was how he made a living. Bromley and Shupe had earlier included a piece by Hassan in a volume they edited (which was otherwise mostly critical of the anti-cult movement) to explain his view, as they considered him one of the best working in the anti-cult field.

Hassan has also applied his cult research to politics. In 2019, he published The Cult of Trump: A Leading Cult Expert Explains How the President Uses Mind Control. The book represents a broadening of his focus from new religious movements into political culture. The author compares Donald Trump's behavior to that of Jim Jones, L. Ron Hubbard, and Sun Myung Moon, and expresses the hope that the book will lessen political division. Its loose usage of the word "cult" led to initial dismissal and criticism, but following January 6 United States Capitol attack interest in Hassan's work in this field increased.

Hassan received his doctorate from Fielding Graduate University and published a dissertation in January 2021. His dissertation was titled "The BITE Model of Authoritarian Control: Undue Influence, Thought Reform, Brainwashing, Mind Control, Trafficking and the Law". Hassan describes his model as an effort to measure degrees of exploitative control or undue influence and as an attempt to evaluate behavior, information, thought and emotional controls. Hassan contributed two chapters relating to hypnosis and society to the 2024 edited volume The Routledge International Handbook of Clinical Hypnosis.

=== In the media ===
Hassan is often described in the media as a cult and mind control expert. After the 2013 Boston Marathon bombing, he was interviewed by reporters to explain his view of the bombers' state of mind and how he believed mind control was involved.

Hassan's definition of "cult-like behavior" was described by the magazine Slate as "particularly wide ranging"; on a blog posting he once compared the British royal family's treatment of Meghan Markle to a cult, saying that "any organization willing to maintain its public image by sacrificing the well-being of its members relies on many of the same psychological theories and tactics used by authoritarian cults." He also described the fitness company SoulCycle as having cult-like aspects. A friend of Hassan stated that he "has a tendency in some ways to see everything as undue influence because he's primed to see it that way", due to his experiences with the Unification Church.

== Publications ==
=== Books ===
- Combating Cult Mind Control, 1988. ISBN 0-89281-243-5 — reissued 1990 (ISBN 978-0-89281-311-7) and 2015 (Combating ..., ISBN 978-0967068824).
- Releasing the Bonds: Empowering People to Think for Themselves, 2000. ISBN 0-9670688-0-0.
- Freedom of Mind: Helping Loved Ones Leave Controlling People, Cults, and Beliefs, 2012. ISBN 978-0-9670688-1-7.
- The Cult of Trump: A Leading Cult Expert Explains How the President Uses Mind Control, October 2019. ISBN 9781982127336.

=== Academic literature ===
- Hassan, S. A., & Shah, M. J. (2019). The anatomy of undue influence used by terrorist cults and traffickers to induce helplessness and trauma, so creating false identities. Ethics, Medicine and Public Health, 8, 97–107. https://doi.org/10.1016/j.jemep.2019.03.002
- Hassan, S. A., & Atack, Jon C. Assessment of Potential Harm in Eastern Religions: the Influence Continuum and the BITE Model (2024). In Moffic & Peteet (Eds.), Eastern Religions, Spirituality, and Psychiatry: An Expansive Perspective on Mental Health and Illness. Springer
- Hassan, S., Scheflin, A. (2024). Chapter 53: Understanding the Dark Side of Hypnosis as a Form of Undue Influence Exerted in Authoritarian Cults and Online Contexts: Implications for Practice, Policy, and Education. In J. Linden, L. Sugarman, G. de Benedittis, and K. Varga (Eds.), Routledge International Handbook of Clinical Hypnosis. Taylor and Francis (UK).
- Scheflin, A., Hassan, S., (2024). Chapter 54: The Image of Hypnosis: Public Perception of the Negative Aspects of Trance. In J. Linden, L. Sugarman, G. de Benedittis, and K. Varga (Eds.), Routledge International Handbook of Clinical Hypnosis. Taylor and Francis (UK).
- Hassan, S.; Caven-Atack, J., Shah, M., Malhotra, S. (2022). Chapter 19: Lone-Actor Terrorism: Understanding Online Indoctrination. In J. Holzer, A. Dew, P. Recupero, P. Gill, and J. Wyman (Ed.), Lone-Actor Terrorism: An Integrated Framework. Oxford University Press. https://doi.org/10.1093/med/9780190929794.003.0020
- Hassan, S., Caven-Atack, J. (2020). Anti-Semitism in Cults and Hate Groups. In: H. S. Moffic et al. (eds.), Anti-Semitism and Psychiatry. Springer, Cham https://doi.org/10.1007/978-3-030-37745-8_23
- Hankir A.Z., Hassan S. (2019). Psychological Determinants and Social Influences of Violent Extremism. In: Moffic H., Peteet J., Hankir A., Awaad R. (eds) Islamophobia and Psychiatry. Springer, Cham. https://doi.org/10.1007/978-3-030-00512-2_32
- Hassan, Steven. (1994). Chapter 6: Strategic Intervention Therapy. In Shupe, A. & Bromley, D. (Ed.), Anti-cult Movements in Cross-cultural Perspective. New York: Garland.

== See also ==
- Anti-cult movement
- Academic study of new religious movements
- Brainwashing
