= Karel Dobbelaere =

Belgian sociologist (1933–2024)

Karel Dobbelaere (16 September 1933 – 21 October 2024) was a Belgian educator and noted sociologist of religion. Dobbelaere was an emeritus Professor of both the University of Antwerp and the Katholieke Universiteit Leuven (Louvain) in Belgium. He was past-President and General Secretary of the International Society for the Sociology of Religion.

== Academic career ==
Karel Dobbelaere was born in Nieuwpoort in Belgium on 16 September 1933. He studied at the Katholieke Universiteit (Catholic University) in Leuven, where he received his doctorate in Social Sciences in 1966. He was appointed a professor at Katholieke Universiteit in 1968. He did important work in the area of the place of religion in the social fabric, and how secularization of religious roles in public institutions affects both society and religion. He did fieldwork with Bryan R. Wilson in researching new religious movements and sects. He also contributed for many years on the Social Sciences committee in Belgium's National Fund for Scientific Research.

His teaching focus was sociology and the sociology of religion. His research fields were the effects of religious participation and in new religious movements and sects.

He was a member of both the Academia Europaea and the Royal Flemish Academy of Belgium for Science and the Arts. He also held visiting professorships at various institutions and universities worldwide. He authored, coauthored and edited over 200 books, articles and studies.

Among his published works are the books Secularization: An Analysis at Three Levels (P.I.E.—Peter Lang, 2002), A Time to Chant (Clarendon, 1994) and Secularization: A Multidimensional Concept (Sage, 1982).

== Theory of secularization ==
Dobbelaere is known for his defense of the classic theory of secularization. His theory of secularization argues that the phenomenon should be studied at three different levels. He calls them "macro-secularization," "meso-secularization," and "micro-secularization."

"Macro-secularization" refers to the decreasing influence of religion on society. Dobbelaere believed there is little doubt that social and political choices are less and less influenced by religion, at least in Western societies, and noted that most sociologists argue with him on this point.

"Meso-secularization" refers to the decline of the organizational level of religion, measured by several indicators, among them church attendance and donations to institutional religion.

The "micro-secularization" refers to the sphere of private beliefs. Contrary to other theorists of secularization, Dobbelaere observed that religion does survive at the "de-institutionalized" level of private beliefs and practices. Here, again, he believed that most sociologists of religion would agree with him.

Dobbelaere argued that religious organizations and institutions are generally declining in the modern world, while his critics claim that this form of secularization is typical of Western Europe (and perhaps Canada and Australia/New Zealand) only, but not of the United States, nor of Latin America, Asia and Africa.

== Study of Soka Gakkai ==
Dobbelaere was among the first Western scholars to publish sociological studies of the Japanese religious movement Soka Gakkai. In A Time to Chant, which he co-authored with British sociologist Bryan R. Wilson, he argued that Soka Gakkai had been successful in the United Kingdom by surrendering certain Japanese features and adapting to the European context.

In his later book, Soka Gakkai: From Lay Movement to Religion (2001), Dobbelaere explored the conflict and eventual separation between the lay leaders of Soka Gakkai and the monks of Nichiren Shoshu as an exemplary case of the tension that is generated when lay members seeking a religious support for their secular lives and priests whose main aim is perpetuating their hierarchical power work together. Dobbelaere also discussed how, after the separation from the monks, Soka Gakkai was reorganized with a different structure but eventually evolved into a full-fledged "religion" and continued with its successful missions abroad.

== Death ==
Dobbelaere died in Heverlee on 21 October 2024, at the age of 91.
