= Karla Poewe =

German-Canadian anthropologist

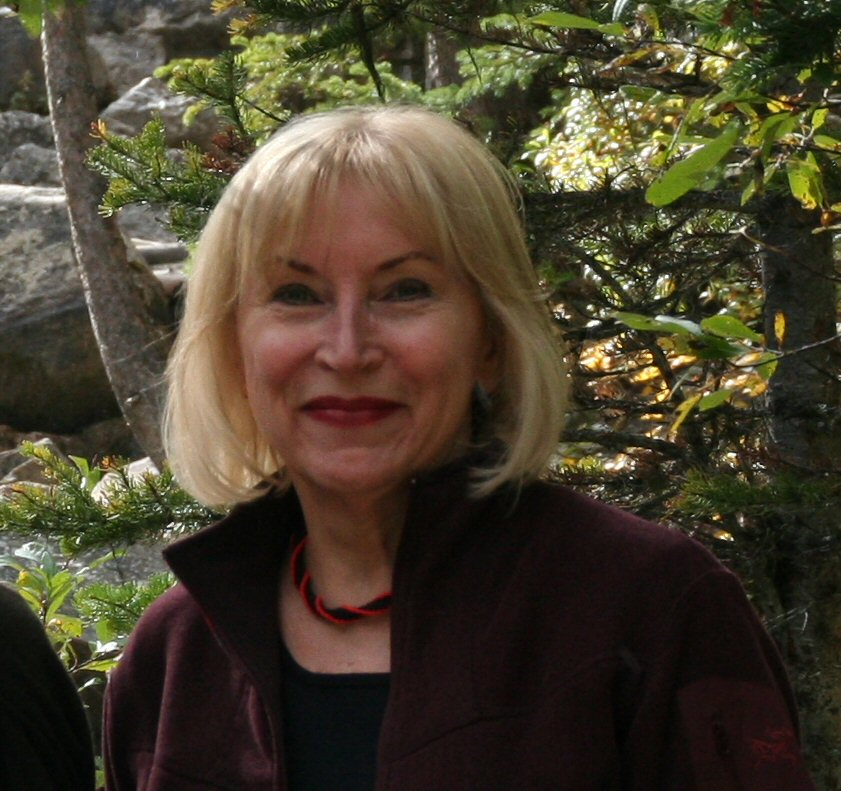
- Poewe in 2007.
- Born: 1941; Königsberg, East Prussia
- Spouse: Irving Hexham (m. 1988)

Academic background
- Education: University of Toronto (B.A.); University of New Mexico (Ph.D.)

Karla Poewe (born 1941) is an anthropologist and historian. She is the author of ten academic books and fifty peer reviewed articles in international journals. Currently Poewe is Professor Emeritus in Anthropology at the University of Calgary, Calgary, Alberta, Canada and Adjunct Research Professor at Liverpool Hope University, Liverpool, England. She is married to Irving Hexham.

== Biography ==
Born 1941 in Königsberg, East Prussia, Poewe became a refugee at the age of three after 189 Lancaster bombers from No. 5 Group of the British RAF dropped 480 tons of bombs on the city centre. Her family was moved to a small estate in Poland, staying several weeks before being moved again. Almost six months later they found themselves in the vicinity of Dresden just in time for the bombing. From Dresden they were moved to Plauen in Saxony and eventually spent three years in Werdau before walking over 250 miles, after the death of Poewe's father, to cross into the British Zone near Göttingen. From there they went to the small town of Buxtehude. Poewe's memories of this period were published as Childhood in Germany during World War II (1988).

Poewe worked as an air hostess with Trans-Canada Airlines before entering the University of Toronto where she won several prestigious scholarships. Originally planning to study medicine, she switched to Anthropology. After completing her B.A. she enrolled in a Ph.D. program at the University of New Mexico where Harry Basehart was her thesis supervisor. Poewe studied for a while with John Middleton at New York University and learned Swahili and Bemba at the University of Wisconsin–Madison. The fieldwork for her Ph.D. thesis was carried out in Zambia.

=== Career ===
After the completion of her thesis she taught for a year at the University of Toronto before moving to the University of Lethbridge in Alberta. She then carried out further fieldwork funded by the Social Sciences and Humanities Research Council of Canada in Namibia. During this time she published her first book, Matrilineal Ideology (1981), followed by Reflections of a Woman Anthropologist (1982). This book, which helped pioneer a new genre of anthropological writing, was, at the publisher's insistence, published under the pseudonym Manda Cesara.

After Poewe married Irving Hexham the two co-authored Understanding Cults and New Religions (1986) and New Religions as Global Cultures (1997). Poewe began fieldwork in South Africa where she studied the rise of Charismatic Christian Churches and the relationship of their members to apartheid. This ground-breaking work resulted in an International Conference held at the University of Calgary in 1993 on the topic of Charismatic Christianity as a Global Culture, which led to the publication of a book with the same title.

Poewe's fieldwork in South Africa came to an end in 1989 when a close friend, the Rt. Rev. Londa Shembe, leader of one branch of the Zulu African Independent Church amaNazaretha, was assassinated and two other friends were also murdered. These tragedies led Poewe to redirect her research interests to looking at the role of missionaries in the areas of Africa where she had studied. The fall of the Berlin Wall enabled her to freely access the archives of the Berlin Missionary Society (BMS). While working in these archives in 1995 she discovered a large amount of material dealing with conflicts between members of the BMS and the Nazi Party.

This material provided the basis for a new project concerning the role of religions in the rise of National Socialism which took almost ten years to complete and resulted in her latest book, New Religions and the Nazis (2006). Currently Poewe is studying the treatment of German refugees following the end of World War II and is interested in the impact of defeat on the defeated.

== Works ==
- Matrilineal Ideology: Male Female Dynamics in Luapula, Zambia. London: Academic Press. 1981.
- (under pseudonym Manda Cesara) Reflections of a Woman Anthropologist: No Hiding Place. London & New York: Academic Press. 1982.
- The Namibian Herero: A History of Their Psychosocial Disintegration and Survival. Lewiston, New York: Edwin Mellen Press. 1985.
- (with Irving Hexham) Understanding Cults and New Religions. Grand Rapids: Eerdmans. 1986.
- Childhood in Germany during World War II: The Story of a Little Girl. Lewiston, New York: Edwin Mellen Press. 1988.
- Religion, Kinship, and Economy in Luapula, Zambia. Lewiston, New York: Edwin Mellen Press. 1989.
- Charismatic Christianity as a Global Culture. Columbia, SC: University of South Carolina Press. 1994.
- (with Irving Hexham) New Religions as Global Cultures: Making the Human Sacred. Boulder: Westview Press. 1997.
- New Religions and the Nazis. Oxford: Routledge. 2006.
- Defeat as Childhood Experience: WWII's Shadow Remembered, Revisited, and Researched. Calgary: Vogelstein Press 2024.

Selected academic papers by Karla Poewe

- "Religion, Matriliny and Change: Jehovah's Witnesses and Seventh‑Day Adventists in Luapula, Zambia", in: American Ethnologist (Washington), Vol. 5, No. 2 May 1978, pp. 301‑321.
- "Matriliny and Capitalism: the Development of Incipient Classes in Luapula, Zambia", in: Dialectical Anthropology (Amsterdam), 1978, Vol. 3, No. 4, pp. 331‑347.
- "Matrilineal Ideology: The Economic Role of Women in Luapula, Zambia", in: The Versatility of Kinship: Studies in Anthropology, edited by L. Cordell and S. Beckerman, Academic Press (London), 1980, pp 333‑357.
- "Strange Pain: Textual Expressions from Africa and the Caribbean", lead paper in: Anthropology and Humanism Quarterly, Special Issue, (Washington), 1985, Vol. 10, No. 4, pp. 91‑99.
- "On the Metonymic Structure of Religious Experiences: The Example of Charismatic Christianity", lead paper in: Cultural Dynamics (Amsterdam), 1989, Vol. II, No.4, pp. 361‑380.
- "Theologies of Black South Africans and the Rhetoric of Peace versus Violence", Canadian Journal of African Studies, (Ottawa) Vol. 27, No. 1, 1993, pp. 43–65.
- "Rethinking the Relationship of Anthropology to Science and Religion", in: Charismatic Christianity as a Global Culture, edited by Karla Poewe, University of South Carolina Press (Columbia, South Carolina), 1994, pp. 234–258.
- "From Volk to Apartheid: The Dialectic Between German and Afrikaner Nationalism", in Missionsgeschichte - Kirchengeschichte - Weltgeschichte [Mission History-Church History-World History], edited by Ulrich van der Heyden/Heike Liebau, Franz Steiner Verlag, (Stuttgart), 1996, pp. 191–213.
- "‘Verfassungsfeindlich’: Church, State and New Religions in Germany." Irving Hexham and Karla Poewe. Nova Religio: The Journal of Alternative and Emergent Religions 2 (2), April 1999, pp. 208-227.
- "Scientific Neo-Paganism and the Extreme Right then and today: from Ludendorff’s 'Gotterkenntnis' to Sigrid Hunke’s 'Europas Eigene Religion'." In Journal of Contemporary Religion 14 (3), October 1999, pp. 387–400.
- "The Spell of National Socialism: The Berlin Mission’s Opposition to, and Compromise with, the Völkisch Movement and National Socialism: Knak, Braun, and Weichert". In: Ulrich van der Heyden und Juergen Becher, Eds. "Mission und Gewalt: Der Umgang christlicher Missionen mit Gewalt und die Ausbreitung des Christentums in Afrika und Asien". (Missionsgeschichtliches Archiv, Band 6) Stuttgart: Franz Steiner Verlag, 2000, pp. 268–290.
- "Politically Compromised Scholars or What German Scholars Working under Missions, National Socialism, and the Marxist Leninist German Democratic Republic Can Teach Us". American Anthropologist 2001 103 (3): 834-837.
- "Liberalism, German Missionaries, and National Socialism: Diedrich Westermannm, Martin Jäckel, and Jakob Wilhelm Hauer". In: Ulrich van der Heyden, Mission und Macht im Wandel politischer Orientierungen: Europäische Missionsgesellschaften in politischen Spannungsfeldern, in Afrika und Asien zwischen 1800 und 1945. Franz Steiner Verlag, Volume 10, March 2005: pp. 1–30.
