= Peter B. Clarke =

British scholar of religion

- Born: Peter Bernard Clarke; 25 October 1940; West Byfleet, England
- Died: 24 June 2011 (aged 70)
- Citizenship: British
- Spouse: Kathy (sep.)

Academic background
- Education: University of Oxford; School of Oriental and African Studies, London; King's College, London
- Thesis: Islamic Millenarianism in South-Western Nigeria (1990)

Academic work
- Discipline: Sociology
- Sub-discipline: Sociology of religion
- Institutions: King's College, London
- Doctoral students: Martyn Percy
- Website: peterbernardclarke.jimdofree.com

Peter Bernard Clarke (25 October 1940 – 24 June 2011) was a British scholar of religion and founding editor of the Journal of Contemporary Religion.

== Academic career ==
Clarke served as professor emeritus of the History and Sociology of Religion at King's College London, having taught there from 1994 to 2003, the Director of the Centre for New Religions at King's College, and a professorial member of the Faculty of Theology at the University of Oxford (since 2003); earlier in his career (1974–1978) he was Professor of African History at the University of Ibadan, Nigeria.

Clarke inaugurated a series of annual conferences on new religious movements at King's, which brought together academics from a variety of backgrounds. These conferences eventually evolved into the "INFORM" (Information Network Focus on Religious Movements) seminars.

Clarke was the founding editor of the Journal of Contemporary Religion, established by the Centre for New Religions in 1985 (the journal appeared under the title Religion Today until 1995).

Clarke's research fields have spanned Islamic movements as well as new religions derived from African, African Brazilian and Japanese roots. His publications include Religion Defined and Explained 1993, with Peter Byrne), Japanese New Religions: In Global Perspective (2006, editor), New Religions in Global Perspective: A Study of Religious Change in the Modern World, the Encyclopedia of New Religious Movements (2005, editor), and The Oxford Handbook of the Sociology of Religion (2008, editor); he is also the author and editor of another 20 books and 100 scholarly articles.

=== Definitions of religion ===
In Religion Defined and Explained, co-written with Peter Byrne, Clarke advocated an elastic definition of religion based on "family resemblance": while religions have "a characteristic set of features", "there will be no single feature or set of features found in each and every example of religion", and "there will be no limits to be set in advance to the kind of characteristic features newly discovered or developing religions might be found to exemplify, nor will there be absolute limits to the additional features such new examples could add to the set". Clarke and Byrne argued that "the various examples of religion will then be related by a network of relationships rather than shared possession of necessary and sufficient conditions for membership of the class." Even so, based on the family resemblance, "one will be able to say of newly found examples whether they are religions or not."

In discussing Australian aboriginal and African "primal religions" in a chapter of The Illustrated Encyclopedia of World Religions, Clarke asserted that terms such as "primal" or "traditional" religions are "controversial", as they are often "wrongly taken to refer to static, unchanging and primitive, or unsophisticated religions found in underdeveloped societies"; Clarke made clear that he was not using the terms in this way, but used them in the sense of "religions that have always been an integral part of the culture of a society", unlike religions "with global ambitions such as Christianity and Islam".

== Death ==
Clarke died on 24 June 2011, due to complications arising from deep-vein thrombosis. In view of his contributions to the field, a decision was made to retain his name as the editor of the Journal of Contemporary Religion until the end of the year 2011. The Sociology of Religion Study Group within the British Sociological Association renamed its 2012 postgraduate essay competition the 2012 Peter B. Clarke Memorial Prize.

== Bibliography ==
- West Africa and Islam: A Study of Religious Development from the 8th to the 20th Century (1982)
- Islam in Modern Nigeria: A Study of a Muslim Community in a Post-Independence State, 1960-1983 (1984, with Ian Linden)
- Black Paradise: Rastafarian Movement (1986)
- West Africa and Christianity (1986)
- The World's Religions (1988, eds.)
- New Trends and Developments in the World of Islam (1988)
- The World's Religions: Understanding the Living Faiths (1993)
- Religion Defined and Explained (1993, with Peter Byrne)
- Japanese New Religions in the West (1994, with Jeffrey Somers)
- Mahdism in West Africa: The Ijebu Mahdiyya Movement (1995)
- A Bibliography of Japanese New Religious Movements (1999)
- The World's Religions: Islam (2002)
- Encyclopedia of New Religious Movements (2005, editor)
- New Religions in Global Perspective: A Study of Religious Change in the Modern World (2006)
- Japanese New Religions: In Global Perspective (2006, editor)
- The Oxford Handbook of the Sociology of Religion (2008, editor)
- The World's Religions: Continuities and Transformations (2009, with Peter Beyer)
