= Cynthia Ann Humes =

Cynthia Ann Humes is a professor of Religious Studies at Claremont McKenna College, in Claremont, California. The college lists her research interests as: History of Hinduism in America, Modern Hindu Goddess Worship, and Gender and Religion. She is also an author, the college's Chief Technology Officer and a Commissioner on the Claremont City Planning Commission.

Humes has spent much time in India in order to study Indian culture, and especially the role of goddesses in modern Hinduism. She has also written on Hinduism's influence on new religious movements in the United States. In 2008 she criticized the Transcendental Meditation movement for its seeming misunderstanding of Indian classical music, while in 2005 she had criticized its exclusivity.

== Bibliography ==
- Living Banaras: Hindu religion in cultural context. By Bradley R. Hertel and Cynthia Ann Humes. Albany: SUNY Press, 1993.
- Gurus in America. By Thomas Forsthoefel and Cynthia Ann Humes. Albany: SUNY Press, 2005.
- Breaking boundaries with the Goddess: New Directions in the Study of Saktism. By Cynthia Ann Humes and Rachel Fell McDermott. Delhi: Manohar Publishers & Distributors, 2009.
- The Ivory Tower and the Cloud. Understanding Cloud Computing (Thomson Reuters/Aspatore: 2010 edition, Inside the Minds series), co-authored with Jeremy Whaley.
- Staying in the IT Game on Campus. Updating Your Company's Technology Strategy: Leading CTOs and CIOs on Working with the Executive Team, Managing Budget Constraints, and Delivering Business Value (Thomson Reuters/Aspatore: 2010 edition, Inside the Minds series).
