= Social Compass =

- Discipline: Sociology of religion
- Language: English, French
- Edited by: Caroline Sappia

Publication details
- History: 1953-present
- Publisher: SAGE Publications
- Frequency: Quarterly
- Impact factor: 0.625 (2019)

Standard abbreviations
- ISO 4: Soc. Compass

Indexing
- ISSN: 0037-7686 (print); 1461-7404 (web)
- LCCN: 67122874
- OCLC no.: 42208179

Links
- Journal homepage; Online access; Online archive

Social Compass is a peer-reviewed academic journal that covers research in the field of sociology of religion. The journal's co-directors are Olivier Servais (University of Louvain) and Frédéric Laugrand (University of Louvain). The current Editor is Carolina Sappia (University of Louvain) and the journal is published by SAGE Publications.

It was established in 1953 and published in the Netherlands until coming to be administered by the Catholic organization of FERES (Fédération Internationale des Instituts Catholiques de Recherches socio-religieuses) in the early 1960s, currently the International Federation of Institutes for Social & Socio-Religious Research.

== Abstracting and indexing ==
Social Compass is abstracted and indexed in Scopus and the Social Sciences Citation Index. According to the most recent Journal Citation Reports, it is ranked 118 out of 148 in Sociology and has a 2-year Impact Factor of 0.625. Its 5-year Impact Factor is 0.870 and it is ranked 110 out of 148 in Sociology. According to SCImago Journal Rank (SJR) in 2019, the journal was ranked 13 out of 490 in Religious Studies.

Total citations made in the JCR year to content published in a journal in the prior five years are divided by the number of articles and reviews published by the journal in the prior five years.
