= Walter Hollenweger =

Swiss theologian (1927–2016)

Walter Jacob Hollenweger (born 1927 in Antwerp; died 10 August 2016) was a Swiss theologian, recognized as an expert on worldwide Pentecostalism. His two best known books are The Pentecostals (1972) and Pentecostalism: Origins and Developments Worldwide (1997).

== Biography ==
From 1949-1958, Hollenweger served as the pastor in a Pentecostal Mission, but in 1962 was ordained in the Swiss Reformed Church.

In 1955 he began studying at the Faculty of Theology of the University of Zurich. He wrote a ten volume doctoral dissertation Handbuch der Pfingstbewegung (Handbook of the Pentecostal Movement) published in 1966. The core of this work was published in various languages and became a standard work on Pentecostalism. His numerous publications in the years following made him one of the premier interpreters of this movement.

Hollenweger, who served as the first Secretary for Evangelism in the Division of World Mission and Evangelism of the World Council of Churches from 1965 to 1971, long continued to be a staunch advocate of ecumenism for Pentecostal churches.

During 1971 to 1989 Hollenweger was Professor of Mission at the University of Birmingham and Selly Oak Colleges at Birmingham, U.K.

After his retirement, Hollenweger and his wife Erica relocated to Krattigen. He died on 10 August 2016.

== Legacy ==
The Hollenweger Center at VU University, Amsterdam, was established in his honor as an academic platform for and across different disciplines within the field of Pentecostal/Charismatic studies, providing opportunities to study Pentecostalism on MA and PhD level (theology, missiology, religious studies, anthropology of religion).

== Works ==
- Hollenweger, W. J., The Pentecostals (Minneapolis: Augsburg Publishing House, 1972).
- Hollenweger, W. J., Pentecostalism: Origins and Developments Worldwide (Hendrickson Publications, 1997).
