= Larry Shinn =

American academic and administrator (born 1942)

Larry Dwight Shinn (January 16, 1942 – April 2, 2025) was president of Berea College, Kentucky, from 1994 to 2012. Prior to this appointment he taught for fourteen years in the Department of Religion, Oberlin College, and was vice-president of Academic Affairs, Dean of Humanities and Head of the Religious Studies Department at Bucknell University.

Larry Shinn received his undergraduate degree from Baldwin-Wallace College located in Berea, Ohio. In 1972 he defended his dissertation Krsna's Lila: An Analysis of the Relationship of the Notion of Deity and the Concept of Samsara in the Bhagavata Purana and received a Ph.D. in history of religions from Princeton University. Shinn has studied Hare Krishnas in America for more than forty years and, among his other writings, published, The Dark Lord, a study of the Hare Krishnas and the cult controversy.

At Oberlin, Shinn became Danforth Professor of South Asian Religion, and was ordained as a minister in the United Methodist Church.

In both high-school and college he played on championship football teams, and served for nine of his fourteen years at Oberlin as assistant football coach.

== Selected publications ==
- Krishna Consciousness in the West, David G. Bromley, Larry D. Shinn, 1989
- Abingdon Dictionary of Living Religions, Keith Crim, Roger Aubrey Bullard, Larry D. Shinn, 1981
- The Dark Lord: Cult Images and the Hare Krishnas in America by Larry D. Shinn, 1987
- ICJ reference
- Two Sacred Worlds: Experience and Structure in the World's Religions, Larry D. Shinn, 1977. Nashville: Abingdon.
