= Thomas Forsthoefel =

American poet

- Occupations: Professor, author, poet
- Spouse: Beth Gylys
- Writing career
- Subjects: Non-fiction: Religious studies Poetry: death, loss, healing, redemption
- Notable awards: Poet Laureate for Erie County, PA, 2010–11

Thomas Forsthoefel is a professor of religious studies at Mercyhurst University in Erie, Pennsylvania, as well as a poet and author. He has a special interest in Hinduism and Buddhism and has written on both new religious movements and established traditions within these faiths, while his own background is Roman Catholic. He is married to Beth Gylys, professor of English and Creative Writing at Georgia State University and a fellow poet.

== Biography ==
In 1999 Forsthoefel met the 14th Dalai Lama while attending a conference of scholars in India. In 2008 he edited an anthology of the Dalai Lama's writings and contributed to a documentary film on him.

In 2010 Forsthoefel was named Poet Laureate of Erie County, Pennsylvania. He said that he was going to use that position to promote a program to introduce poetry to people incarcerated in local prisons. His tenure as poet laureate was renewed for 2011.

In 2011 The New York Times quoted Forsthoefel concerning the high school from which he had graduated, Fordson High School of Detroit, and its overnight football practices to accommodate Muslim students fasting for Ramadan:

I think it is really in keeping with the best instincts of Islam in honoring the Ramadan fast, which, in my view, is an intentional disruption of quotidian life to affirm and galvanize key principles of Islam and to live under submission to Allah. I find that very honorable and a real testimony to the awareness that there is something going on in life other than making a buck or seeing the bottom line.

— Thomas Forsthoefel, The New York Times

== Published works ==
Forsthoefel's published books include:

- Four charismatic thinkers on violence and non-violence: analysis and evaluation (Loyola University of Chicago, 1987)
- Epistemologies of religious experience in medieval and modern Vedānta (University of Chicago Divinity School), 1998)
- Knowing beyond knowledge: epistemologies of religious experience in classical and modern Advaita (Ashgate, 2002)
- Gurus in America co-editor with Cynthia Ann Humes (SUNY Press, 2005)
- Soulsong: Seeking Holiness, Coming Home (Orbis Books, 2006)
- The Dalai Lama: essential writings editor (Orbis Books, 2008)
