= Bryan R. Wilson =

British sociologist (1926–2004)

- Born: 25 June 1926; Leeds, England
- Died: 9 October 2004 (aged 78); Middleton Stoney, Oxfordshire, England
- Title: Reader in Sociology

Academic background
- Education: University of London; London School of Economics
- Thesis: Social aspects of religious sects: A study of some contemporary groups in Great Britain with special reference to a Midland city (1955)
- Doctoral advisor: Donald Gunn MacRae

Academic work
- Discipline: Sociologist
- Institutions: University of Oxford; All Souls College, Oxford

Bryan Ronald Wilson (25 June 1926 – 9 October 2004) was a British sociologist. He was Reader Emeritus in Sociology at the University of Oxford and President of the International Society for the Sociology of Religion (1971–1975). He became a Fellow of All Souls College, Oxford in 1963.

Wilson was the author of several influential books on new religious movements, including Sects and Society: A Sociological Study of the Elim Tabernacle, Christian Science, and Christadelphians (1961), Magic and the Millennium (1973), and The Social Dimensions of Sectarianism (1990).

== Academic life ==
Wilson was born in Leeds. He spent his undergraduate years at University College, Leicester, obtaining an External BSc (Econ) with First Class Honours from the University of London in 1952. He continued his studies under the supervision of Donald MacRae at the London School of Economics, where he was awarded his PhD in 1955 for a thesis entitled Social aspects of religious sects: A study of some contemporary groups in Great Britain with special reference to a Midland city. His thesis formed the basis of his first book, Sects and Society (1961).

He took up a lecturing post at the University of Leeds where he was also Warden of Sadler Hall, former University of Leeds accommodation for students. He held these positions until 1962, when he became Reader in Sociology at Oxford. A year later he became a Fellow of All Souls, and returned there after each of his many sojourns in Europe, America, Africa, Asia, or Australia as a researcher or visiting professor. In 1984 the University of Oxford conferred upon him a DLitt. In 1992 the Catholic University of Leuven, Louvain, Belgium, conferred upon him the degree of Doctor Honoris Causa in recognition of his outstanding contribution to the sociology of religion.

== Work and legacy ==
Wilson was a founding member of the University Association for the Sociology of Religion. From 1971 to 1975, he was President of the CISR (now known as the International Society for the Sociology of Religion or SISR). At the 1991 conference he became the first scholar to receive an honorary presidency from the Society. He was European editor of the Journal for the Scientific Study of Religion, sitting on the editorial board of the Annual Review of the Social Science of Religion, and sharing responsibility for the English-language papers of SISR issues of Social Compass.

Wilson exercised a formative influence on the sociology of religion in Britain. His 1959 paper, "An Analysis of Sect Development" in the American Sociological Review, and his book Sects and Society (1961) – a study of the Elim Churches, the Christadelphians, and Christian Science – may be regarded as representing the beginning of contemporary academic study of new religious movements.

Wilson created a sociological typology to analyse new religious movements:

1. Conversionist. Proponents focus on the corruptness of the world which is driven by the corruptness of humans. The conversionist seeks a supernatural transformation of their self to change the world.
2. Revolutionist. Proponents hold that the entire world or existing social order must be destroyed to save humans.
3. Introversionist. Proponents view the world as evil to the core; the introversionist response is to withdraw from the earth as fully as possible.
4. Gnostic-manipulationist. Salvation is possible when people master the right means and techniques to overcome their problems.
5. Thaumaturgical. Individuals seek special local and magical dispensations which enable them to escape from the problems of the world.
6. Reformist. People must seek supernaturally-bestowed insights that enable them to mould the world toward good ends.
7. Utopian. People, without recourse to divine intervention, must create a brand new social order wherein evil cannot manifest.

Wilson made further contributions with his influential The Social Dimensions of Sectarianism: Sects and New Religious Movements in Contemporary Society (1990). He was also a pioneer of studies of millennialism, many years before this field achieved its present visibility, in Magic and the Millennium (1973).

Wilson also engaged with specific religious groups to help determine if they were a "cult" or not. He studied and wrote a short paper about the Bruderhof in which he declares that they are not a cult. He wrote: "If these characteristics are accepted as the popular understanding of what is meant by the term “cult”, then it must be said that the Bruderhof in no way approximates “cult” status. Its goals and values are positive and life-affirming, and it maintains non-violence as a basic principle."

Together with Karel Dobbelaere, he wrote an extensive paper on the "Moonies in Belgium". In it, he compares the media reaction to the Unification Church despite there being only a handful of committed Moonies in the country.

The book Secularization, Rationalism, and Sectarianism: Essays in Honour of Bryan R. Wilson (1993) was published in his honour.

According to Benjamin Beit-Hallahmi in 2025, Wilson argued for a "minimal definition of religion", meaning looking only at beliefs and not motivation, which allowed the "religion" label to be applied to Scientology. Wilson also compared Scientology to more mainstream religious groups like Quakers, Pentecostal groups, Judaism, and Buddhism. Beit-Hallahmi criticized Wilson for his writing on Scientology, saying that some of his claims about the group "indicate total ignorance (or willful deception)". In addition, according to Beit-Hallahmi, Wilson's statements about Scientology, and other groups like Jehovah’s Witnesses and Christian Science, reflect "an apparent lack of familiarity with the actual practices of these groups".

== Publications ==
- B. R. Wilson, "An Analysis of Sect Development", American Sociological Review 24 (1959): 3–15.
- B. R. Wilson, Sects and Society: A Sociological Study of the Elim Tabernacle, Christian Science, and Christadelphians (Berkeley: Univ. of California Press, 1961).
- B. R. Wilson, Religion in Secular Society (1966).
- B. R. Wilson, editor. Patterns of Sectarianism: Organisation and Religious Ideology in Social and Religious Movements. Heinemann Books on Sociology (London: Heinemann Educational Books Ltd, 1967).
- B. R. Wilson, Religious Sects: A Sociological Study (McGraw-Hill, 1970).
- B. R. Wilson, editor. Rationality. Key Concepts in the Social Sciences (New York: Harper & Row, 1970).
- B. R. Wilson, Magic and the Millennium (New York: Harper, 1973).
- B. R. Wilson, The Noble Savages: The Primitive Origins of Charisma and Its Contemporary Survival (University of California Press, 1975).
- B. R. Wilson, Religion in Sociological Perspective (Oxford: Oxford University Press, 1982).
- B. R. Wilson, The Social Dimensions of Sectarianism: Sects and New Religious Movements in Contemporary Society (Oxford: Clarendon Press, 1992).
- B. R. Wilson and K. Dobbelaere, A Time to Chant: The Sōka Gakkai Buddhists in Britain (Oxford: Clarendon Press, 1994).
- B. R. Wilson and J. Cresswell, New Religious Movements: Challenge and Response (Psychology Press, 1999).
