= James A. Beckford =

British sociologist of religion (1942–2022)

James Arthur Beckford FBA (1 December 1942 – 10 May 2022) was a British sociologist of religion. He was professor emeritus of sociology at the University of Warwick and a Fellow of the British Academy. In 1988/1989, he served as president of the Association for the Sociology of Religion, and from 1999 to 2003, as the president of the International Society for the Sociology of Religion.

Apart from general writings on the sociology of religion, Beckford has been a prolific author of books and articles on new religious movements and society's responses to them. He has also researched and written about religious issues affecting prison inmates.

== Academic positions ==
In his early career, Beckford held teaching posts at the Universities of Reading and Durham and at Loyola University Chicago. He founded the British Sociological Association's Study Group for the Sociology of Religion in 1975, serving as its chairman from 1978 to 1983. From 1982 to 1983 Beckford was a Senior Fulbright Fellow at the University of California, Berkeley. From 1982 to 1986, he was the president of the International Sociological Association Research Committee 22, and in 1988/1989 served as the president of the Association for the Sociology of Religion. He joined the University of Warwick in 1989. From 1999 to 2003, he was the president of the International Society for the Sociology of Religion. He has also taught as a visiting professor in Paris, at the Ecole des Hautes Etudes en Sciences Sociales in 2001, and at the Ecole Pratique des Hautes Etudes in 2004.

Beckford was the editor of Current Sociology from 1980 to 1987, the vice-president for publications of the International Sociological Association from 1994 to 1998, and has been a member of the editorial board of the British Journal of Sociology since 1998. He has chaired the management committee of INFORM (Information Network Focus on Religious Movements), a British charity set up by sociologist Eileen Barker with the support of Britain's mainstream churches to provide the public with information on new religious movements, and was co-vice-chairman of the charity's board of governors.

In 2017, Beckford was honored with the Lifetime Achievement Award for Contributions to the Sociology of Religion by the Association for the Sociology of Religion.

== Research and publications ==
Beckford's doctoral thesis was the first major sociological study of the Jehovah's Witnesses, The Trumpet of Prophecy (1975), which has remained an important reference work on the group. His research focus then shifted to cults and new religious movements and the responses they provoke from wider society. On the basis of his empirical studies of the anti-cult movement in Britain, France and Germany, Beckford contended that the responses to new religious movements reveal as much about a society as studies of the relevant movements themselves. He explored this topic further in Cult Controversies: Societal Responses to New Religious Movements, highlighting the differing ways movement members (and ex-members) relate to each other and to the surrounding society, and proposing that these differences could serve as the basis of a new model for classifying new religious movements.

Beckford has called for sociologists of religion to end their isolation from other sociological disciplines, arguing in Religion and Advanced Industrial Society (1989) that this might return religious studies to their former position of prominence, and has explored various adjacent sociological fields himself in his writings.

In reference to Islam, Beckford has more recently argued that neglecting the needs of Muslim prison inmates, such as the failure of most French prisons to provide halal meat or religious services for Muslims, leads to more widespread resentment and increased radicalisation among the Muslim community: "This feeds back into the community of Muslims outside the prisons, who hear what goes on and are disturbed by it. It feeds their sense of alienation." He has also commented on the increasing importance that the internet has assumed for Muslim communities, saying it had become "a wonderful device (for linking) Muslims around the world, especially Muslims in diaspora. Something like (Facebook) can kind of light up or activate communities that are already in place."

In addition to his books, Beckford has authored around 150 articles and book chapters to date. A festschrift celebrating his contributions to the field, The Centrality of Religion in Social Life. Essays in Honour of James A. Beckford, edited by Eileen Barker, was published in 2008.

== Publications ==
- Religious Organization (1974)
- The Trumpet of Prophecy. A Sociological Analysis of Jehovah's Witnesses (1975)
- Cult Controversies: The Societal Response to New Religious Movements (1985)
- New Religious Movements and Rapid Social Change (1986, editor), published by SAGE Publications and UNESCO, ISBN 0-8039-8591-6
- Religion and Advanced Industrial Society (1989)
- The Changing Face of Religion (1989, co-editor)
- Religion in Prison. Equal Rites in a Multi-Faith Society (1998, with Sophie Gilliat)
- Secularization, Rationalism and Sectarianism (1999, editor)
- Social Theory and Religion (2003)
- Challenging Religion (2003, editor)
- Muslims in Prison: Challenge and Change in Britain and France (2005)
- Theorising Religion: Classical and Contemporary Debates (2006, editor)

== Articles ==
- "Why Britain doesn't go to church", BBC News, 2004-02-17
- "Cults need vigilance, not alarmism", Church Times, 2008-06-20
