= Irving Hexham =

English-Canadian academic

Irving Hexham FRHistS FRAI
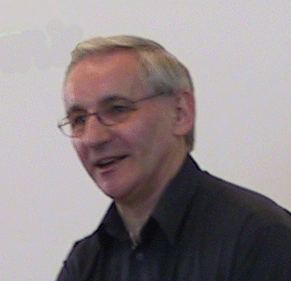
- Born: Irving R. Hexham; 14 April 1943 (age 83); Whitehaven, England
- Spouse: Karla Poewe (m. 1988)

Academic background
- Education: University of Lancaster; University of Bristol
- Thesis: Totalitarian Calvinism (1975)
- Doctoral advisor: Kenneth Ingham

Academic work
- Discipline: Religious studies
- Institutions: Bishop Lonsdale College; Regent College; University of Manitoba; University of Calgary
- Doctoral students: Douglas E. Cowan
- Main interests: African-initiated churches; Afrikaner nationalism; neo-Calvinism; neo-Paganism; new religious movements; political religion; religion and politics; world Christianity
- Website: people.ucalgary.ca/~hexham

Irving R. Hexham FRHistS FRAI (born 14 April 1943) is an English-Canadian academic who has published twenty-three books and numerous articles, chapters, and book reviews. Currently, he is Professor Emeritus of Religious Studies at the University of Calgary, Alberta, Canada, married to Karla Poewe who is Professor Emeritus of Anthropology at the University of Calgary, and the father of two children. He holds dual British and Canadian citizenship.

== Biography ==
Hexham was born in Whitehaven, Cumberland, England. After leaving school at the age of fifteen he spent six years (1958–1964) as an apprentice gas fitter with the North Western Gas Board, and obtained his City and Guilds and advanced diplomas in Gas Technology. After the completion of his apprenticeship he was offered a management position with the Gas Board. During his industrial career he also served as a union representative.

Hexham qualified for university matriculation by correspondence study and entered the University of Lancaster in 1967 where he majored in religious studies with minors in history and philosophy. He graduated with honours with a Bachelor of Arts degree in 1970. He then proceeded to post-graduate studies, obtaining his MA "with commendation" in religious studies and theology from the University of Bristol in 1972. His MA was based on anthropological methods and theories and involved a short dissertation on Glastonbury. He obtained a PhD in history from the University of Bristol in 1975. His PhD thesis was on Afrikaner Calvinism and the origins of apartheid as an ideology. In the course of his studies he lived in the Republic of South Africa and studied the languages of German and Afrikaans. His MA supervisor was F. B. Welbourn; his PhD supervisor was Kenneth Ingham. When he was in South Africa Elaine Botha at Potchefstroom University was appointed his local supervisor by the University of Bristol.

Hexham is an evangelical Anglican.

== Academic career ==
Hexham has held a number of posts in various tertiary institutions of higher learning. He was an assistant professor at Bishop Lonsdale College, University of Derby, England from 1974 to 1977. He also served as a course tutor in the Open University at Derby (1975–77). Hexham then relocated to Canada and assumed the post of assistant professor at Regent College, Vancouver (1977–80). He became an assistant professor in religious studies at the University of Manitoba, Winnipeg (1980–84), and then an assistant professor in religious studies at the University of Calgary (1984–88). He was promoted to the rank of associate professor at Calgary (1988–92), and in 1992 assumed the post of Full Professor in religious studies.

Hexham is a Fellow of both the Royal Anthropological Institute, and the Royal Historical Society has been a member of various professional organizations including the Society for the Scientific Study of Religion, American Academy of Religion, Association for the Sociology of Religion, South African Institute of Race Relations, South African Society for Mission Studies, and the Berliner Gesellschaft fuer Missionsgeschichte of which he was a founding member with Ulrich van der Heyden. Recently he was elected a Fellow of the Centre for Military and Strategic Studies at the University of Calgary.

Hexham has lectured in undergraduate and post-graduate programs covering topics such as cults, sects and new religious movements, history of religion, sociology of religion, African history and religions, religion and society in South Africa, millenarian movements, theology and politics, Christianity and culture, missions and society, religion and ethics, fundamentalism and charismatic religion, methods in the study of religion, and the philosophy of religion.

His academic interests are listed as political religions; nationalism and religion; Afrikaner nationalism; Nazism; new religious movements; world religions in modern society; world Christianity and Christian missions, African initiated/independent churches; modern religious thought; while his research interests are said to be Ancestral neo-Paganism, the New Right, and political religions in Germany.

He served as a contributing editor to the Journal of Theology for Southern Africa (1981–1993), and is on the Editorial Board of Studies in Religion.

Hexham has written or co-edited a number of works treating various facets of religion in South Africa including African independent churches, Afrikaner Calvinism, and Zulu religion. He has compiled reference works such as the Concise Dictionary of Religion and Pocket Dictionary of New Religious Movements. He has co-written two analytic works on the phenomenon of new religions and cults, and co-edited a pioneering work on the development of Christian contextual missions and new religious movements. Currently, as can be seen from his recent publications, Hexham is working on issues related to Germany.

Among his graduate students are Douglas E. Cowan of the University of Waterloo, Mark Mullins of Sophia University in Tokyo, and Kurt Widmar of the University of Lethbridge.

== Contribution to scholarship ==
Hexham began his academic research with a study of New Age thought in Glastonbury. He continued his research with a study of the origins of the ideology of Apartheid. (Note: A revised version of his PhD thesis was published as: Irving Hexham, The Irony of Apartheid, Lewiston, Edwin Mellen, 1981.) Later he pioneered the study of the amaNazareta by publishing the complete scriptures of this important African Independent Church which in the past was often considered pagan. Alongside his South African studies Hexham also published extensively on New Religious Movements, Theology, the History of Christian Missions, and, more recently National Socialism.

His contributions to scholarship were recognized by the award of an academic Festschrift on 23 May 2008 in the Faculty of Theology at the Humboldt University in Berlin.

== Selected essays ==
Published reports

- Religious Extremism in Africa, for UNHCR Emergency & Security Service, Geneva, September 2002, pp. 37
- A Review of the Current State of Religious Magazines and Newspapers in Canada," Ottawa, Department of Canadian Heritage, Ottawa, October 2002, pp. 55, assisted by Joanne Emond-McCullum who worked on the French Canadian publications section.

Refereed academic articles:

- "Just Like Another Israel", Religion (London), 1977, 7/1, pp. 1–7.
- "Calvinism and Culture", CRUX (Vancouver), December 1979, pp. 14–19.
- "Dutch Calvinism and the Origins of Afrikaner Nationalism", African Affairs (London), Spring, 1980, pp. 195–208.
- "Christianity and Apartheid: An Introductory Bibliography", Reformed Journal (Grand Rapids), April 1980, pp. S1-S11.
- "Lord of the Sky-King of the Earth: Zulu Traditional Religion and Belief in the Sky God", Studies in Religion (Waterloo), Vol. 10, 3, 1981, pp. 273–285.
- "Conversion and Consolidation in an English Town: The Freaks of Glastonbury: 1967–1982", Update (Aarhus), March 1983, pp. 3–12.
- "Science Fiction, Christianity and Technic Civilization", Word and World (St. Paul), Vol. IV. No 1, Winter, 1984, pp. 35–42.
- "Religion in Southern Africa", Religious Studies Review, (Waterloo), June 1985, Vol. II, No.4, pp. 370–378.
- "The Soul of the New Age", with Karla Poewe-Hexham, Christianity Today (Chicago), 2 September 1988, pp. 17–21.
- "Charismatic Christianity and Change in South Africa", with Karla Poewe-Hexham, The Christian Century (Chicago), 7–24 August 1988, pp. 738–740.
- "African Religions: Recent & Lesser Known Works", Religion, (Lancaster), Vol. 20; 1990, pp. 361–372.
- "On Plagiarism and Integrity in Scholarly Activity", Humanist: Humanities Computing, 5:4, 3 April 1992, received electronically via humanist@brownvm.bitnet, 5.0814. This article was published electronically and was later cited in Lingua Franca, September/October 1992, pp. 18–20, and College & Research Libraries, Vol.53, No. 5, September 1992, p. 455.
- "Isaiah Shembe: Zulu Religious Leader", Religion, 27:4, October 1997, pp. 361–373, this is a revised English version of 33.
- "Verfassungsfeindlich: Church, State and New Religions in Germany", Nova Religio: The Journal of Alternative and Emergent Religions. Vol. 2, No. 2, 1999, pp. 208–227.
- "Suicide or Murder in Uganda?" Religion in the News, August 2000:7–9 + 24.
- "New Religions and the Anti-Cult Movement in Canada", Nova Religio, 2 April 2001, Vol. 4, No.2, pp. 281–288.
- "Jakob Wilhelm Hauer's New Religion and National Socialism," with Karla Poewe, in the Journal of Contemporary Religion, London, Vol. 20, No. 2, May 2005, pp. 195–215.
- " Inventing 'Paganists': a Close Reading of Richard Steigmann-Gall's the Holy Reich," the Journal of Contemporary History, January 2007 pp. 59–78.
- "The Völkisch Modernist Beginnings of National Socialism: Its Intrusion into the Church and Its Antisemitic Consequence," with Karla Poewe, in Religion Compass, 2009, pp. 676–696.

== Selected books ==
- The Irony of Apartheid: The Struggle for National Independence of Afrikaner Calvinism Against British Imperialism, (Texts and Studies in Religion, Vol 8), Lewiston, Edwin Mellen, 1981, pp. 239, ISBN 0889469040
- Religion, Economics, and Social Thought, with Walter Block, Vancouver, The Fraser Institute, 1986, pp. 573
- Understanding Cults and New Age Religions, with Karla Poewe
  - Eerdmans Pub Co, paperback, 1986, pp. 170, ISBN 0802801706
  - Regent College Publishing; 2nd edition, paperback, 1998, pp. 184, ISBN 1573831212
- Zulu Religion: Texts and Interpretations. Vol. I: Traditional Zulu Ideas about God, Lewiston, Edwin Mellen, 1987, pp. 455.
- The Concise Dictionary of Religion, Regent College Publishing, 1993, Paperback, pp. 248, ISBN 1573831204
- The Scriptures of the amaNazaretha of Ekuphakameni, translated from the Zulu by the Rt. Rev. Londa Shembe and Hans-Jürgen Becken, with introductory essays by Irving Hexham and G.C. Oosthuizen, Calgary, University of Calgary Press, 1994, pp. xlix + 144.
- The Story of Isaiah Shembe – History and Traditions Centered on EkuPhakameni and Mount Nhlangakazi: Volume One of the Sacred History and Traditions of the amaNazaretha, translated from the Zulu by Hans-Jürgen Becken, edited with G.C. Oosthuizen, Lewiston, Edwin Mellen Press, 1996, pp. 258, ISBN 0773487735
- New Religions as Global Cultures, with Karla Poewe, Boulder, Westview Press, 1997, pp. 180, ISBN 0813325080
- The Christian Travelers Guide to Britain, Grand Rapids, Zondervan, April 2001, pp. 245, ISBN 0310225523
- The Christian Travelers Guide to France, (ed.) by Mark Konnert, Peter Barrs and Carine Barrs, 2001, pp. 224, ISBN 0310225884
- Christian Travelers Guide to Germany, with Lothar Henry Kope, Zondervan, 2001, pp. 240, ISBN 0310225396
- Pocket Dictionary of New Religious Movements: Over 400 Groups, Individuals & Ideas Clearly and Concisely Defined, IVP Academic, 2002, Paperback, pp. 120, ISBN 0830814663
- Understanding World Religions, Grand Rapids, Zondervan, 2011, pp. 512.
