= Journal of Contemporary Religion =

- Discipline: Religious studies
- Language: English
- Edited by: Elisabeth Arweck

Publication details
- Former name(s): Religion Today
- History: 1985–present
- Publisher: Routledge
- Frequency: Triannual

Standard abbreviations
- ISO 4: J. Contemp. Relig.

Indexing
- ISSN: 1353-7903 (print); 1469-9419 (web)

Links
- Journal homepage; Current issue; Online archive

The Journal of Contemporary Religion is a triannual peer-reviewed academic journal which covers anthropological, sociological, psychological and philosophical aspects of religion.

== History and format ==
The journal was established in 1985 as Religion Today by the Centre for New Religions at King's College London. Its founding editor was Peter B. Clarke (later at Wolfson College, Oxford). The journal, which changed its name to the current title in 1995, is published by Routledge. Its current editor is Elisabeth Arweck (University of Warwick); Peter B. Clarke, who died in June 2011, remained listed as co-editor until the end of that year out of respect for his contributions to the field.

An issue of the triannual journal typically features five or six major articles. Other content includes conference reports, research notes, book reviews and review articles, and articles are sometimes illustrated with graphics or photographs.

== Reception ==
The Times Higher Education stated in a 1997 review of the journal that "The contributors are invariably academics, mainly from North America and Europe. The style ranges from the homely, almost chatty at times, to the more formal. The articles, however, are on the whole scholarly and, as advertised, treat of a wide range of subjects, from the Brahma Kumaris to Sahaja Yoga, from the 'Toronto Blessing' to the nature of fundamentalism, from 'The Protestant eruption into modern Brazilian politics' to 'Deconfessionalisation in the Netherlands' (in the last three decades or so). There are fieldwork reports, ethnographic accounts, and historical and conceptual studies. The standard of research and analysis is what one would expect from a good academic journal." The review criticised the small number and seemingly arbitrary selection of book reviews, but concluded by stating that "On the whole, then, the journal is a valuable research tool and source of new knowledge for scholars, teachers and others interested in studying the phenomenon of contemporary religion. With nothing really comparable available in the field, it is highly recommended."

== Abstracting and indexing ==
The Journal of Contemporary Religion is abstracted and indexed in Applied Social Sciences Index & Abstracts, British Humanities Index, Worldwide Political Science Abstracts, EBSCOhost, Educational Research Abstracts Online, Multicultural Education Abstracts, New Testament Abstracts, Religious & Theological Abstracts, Sociological Abstracts, and Studies on Women and Gender Abstracts.
