= Captive Hearts, Captive Minds =

1994 anti-cult book

- Captive Hearts, Captive Minds
- Author: Madeleine Landau Tobias; Janja Lalich; Michael Langone
- Language: English
- Subject: Cults psychology
- Publisher: Hunter House Publishers
- Publication date: April 1994
- Publication place: United States
- Media type: Print (Hardcover and Paperback)
- Pages: 304
- ISBN: 0-89793-144-0
- OCLC: 29319977
- Dewey Decimal: 362.2 20
- LC Class: BP603 .T62 1994
- Followed by: Cults in Our Midst; Bounded Choice

Captive Hearts, Captive Minds: Freedom and Recovery from Cults and Other Abusive Relationships is a study of cults and abusive relationships by Madeleine Landau Tobias, Janja Lalich, and Michael Langone. It was published by Hunter House Publishers in 1994. In 2006, the book was reissued as Take Back Your Life: Recovering from Cults and Abusive Relationships.

In her book Twisted Scriptures: Breaking Free from Churches that Abuse, Christian countercult author Mary Alice Chrnalogar cites Captive Hearts, Captive Minds and adds a note that the book is "excellent for former New Agers".

The work is extensively cited in Dennis Tourish and Tim Wohlforth's On the Edge: Political Cults Left and Right in their chapter on Marlene Dixon.

Robert L. Snow cites the work in his book, Deadly Cults: The Crimes of True Believers, to analyze predisposing factors that might make certain individuals more inclined than others to join cults. Snow cites Lalich and Tobias again later in his work, while discussing the experience of a woman who had been counseled by a therapist that belonged to what Snow referred to as "an intensely controlling psychoanalytical cult called the Sullivanians."

Captive Hearts, Captive Minds is also cited by Philip Jenkins in his book Mystics and Messiahs: Cults and New Religions in American History, in the chapter "Overrun with Messiahs", but it is not clear that he agrees with the authors' analysis.

As the title would suggest, Captive Hearts, Captive Minds falls squarely within the category of books whose authors adopt anti-cult movement theories and rhetoric concerning new religious movements, including the theory that participants in such movements are "victims" of "thought reform" or "mind control". This theory is not universally accepted by psychologists and other scholars of religion. Other theories concerning new religious movements attribute free will and informed choice to the participants, and challenge the captivity/abuse model put forward by the authors here.

== Reception ==
Writing for Library Journal, Bill Piekarski believes that the book "succeeds as an ambitious, comprehensive explanation of the cult experience and works well on several levels". He recommended it for public and religious libraries.

In Cultic Studies Journal, exit counselor Carol Giambalvo says Part III of the book "lacks an account by a former member of a Bible-based, discipling/shepherding group", but argues that it is generally an "extremely helpful book".

== See also ==
- Bounded Choice
- Cults in Our Midst
