= Recovery from Cults =

1995 book edited by Michael Langone

Recovery From Cults
- Book Cover
- Editor: Michael Langone
- Authors: Susan Andersen, David Clark, Richard L. Dowhower, Gary Eisenberg, Geri-Ann Galanti, Kevin Garvery, Lorna Goldberg, William Goldberg, Carol Giambalvo, Noel Giambalvo, Susan J. Kelley, Janja Lalich, Madeleine Landau Tobias, Michael Langone, Paul R. Maring, Arnold Markowits, Herbert L. Rosedale, Patrick L. Ryan, Margaret Singer, Mark Trahan, Rob Tucker, Philip Zimbardo
- Cover artist: Justine Burkat Trubey, book design
- Language: English
- Subject: cults
- Genre: non-fiction
- Publisher: W. W. Norton & Company
- Publication date: June 1995
- Publication place: United States
- Pages: 432
- ISBN: 0-393-31321-2
- OCLC: 32776672

Recovery from Cults: Help for Victims of Psychological and Spiritual Abuse a 1995 book about counselling and therapeutic approaches for individuals exposed to coercive or harmful practices in cults. It is edited by Michael Langone, director of the anti-cult non-profit organization International Cultic Studies Association (formerly the American Family Foundation), and is published by W. W. Norton & Company. The book examines coercive cult practices through theories of social influence, cognitive psychology, and psychotherapy.

The book has 22 contributors, primarily from the International Cultic Studies Association. Designed as a reference for people seeking help past New Religious Movements/Cults/Sects experiences.

== Reviews ==
The review in The Journal of Nervous and Mental Disease observes that the book "looks at cults from the perspective of ex-cultists and the mental health specialists who help them to break away and, equally difficult, to pick up and integrate the threads of normal living once again." It notes that the work begins "with an introduction and historical background and then presents an edited collection of 19 essays that are, taken individually, stimulating and informative and that, taken as an ensemble, give a rounded view of cultic processes and exiting from cults." The review summarizes the contents as descriptions of cult dynamics; strategies and insights from therapists; and interpretation of cult dynamics through theories of social influence, cognitive psychology, and psychotherapy. The reviewer concludes: "I regard this as a good book, value for money and also value for the time it takes to read it...It will be particularly useful for therapists whose clientele includes present and former cult members".

A review in the British Medical Journal stated that the work appears mostly aimed at people who are concerned a friend or relative might be in a cult, little exploration of why an individual would join a cult, that there is little analysis of the definition or effectiveness of "exit counselling" that the book recommends, and there is little difference in the outcomes of exit counselling irrespective of whether the person left the cult voluntarily versus being ejected.
