= Bounded Choice =

2004 book by Janja Lalich

- Cover of the first edition
- Author: Janja Lalich
- Language: English
- Subject: Cults
- Publisher: University of California Press
- Publication date: September 15, 2004
- Publication place: United States
- Media type: Print (Paperback)
- Pages: 353
- ISBN: 0-520-24018-9
- OCLC: 54046983
- Dewey Decimal: 306/.1 22
- LC Class: BP605.H36 L35 2004
- Preceded by: Captive Hearts, Captive Minds, Cults in Our Midst

Bounded Choice: True Believers and Charismatic Cults is a 2004 psychology and sociology book on cults by Janja Lalich. It was published by University of California Press.

Lalich had previously studied Heaven's Gate and the Democratic Workers Party (DWP) for her doctoral dissertation titled "Bounded Choice: The Fusion of Personal Freedom and Self-Renunciation in Two Transcendent Groups", and that research was incorporated into the book.

Lalich's methodologies were influenced by the work of Anthony Giddens, Herbert Simon and Robert Lifton. Heaven's Gate, a UFO religion, was used as a model for analyzing the cult structure.

According to Rubina Ramji's review, Lalich identifies four structures to cults: charismatic authority, a transcendent belief system, systems of control, and systems of influence. They interlock to create "true believers" who end up in a state of "bounded choice" in the cult.

== Reception ==
Marion Harmon wrote "Lalich's research culminated in a new theory to explain how the combination of ideology, social structure, and commitment constrains the choice of true believers."

Richard Erik Ocejo in Contemporary Sociology compliments Lalich's research as "extensive". He writes that her work avoids being a "quasi auto-ethnography" despite the DWP being fairly unknown to academia. Ocejo believes the work "demystifies the cultic group" and documents the "potential consequences (both positive and negative) for the individual and society as a whole".

Rubina Ramji in her review for Sociology of Religion argues the book is a good introduction to thought-reform for those unfamiliar with the academic study of new religious movements, but it adds little for those already familiar with the field. Ramji also argues that the book does not take into account the adherents of cults who leave the groups out of their own volition.

Thomas Robbins writes for Nova Religio the book leaves out interesting details about the DWP from her analysis, particularly the fact that the leaders were primarily women. He also believes that the book reads like a "demonology" or an "indictment" of the groups on top of an socio-psychological analysis.

Folklorist Elinor S. Levy thinks the book was interesting from a folkloric point of view; however, Levy believes that Lalich wanted to memoir about the DWP "but realized that the only acceptable academic approach would be analytic and comparative" to other groups.

Dennis Tourish for the journal Leadership compliments Lalich's contribution to the area of leadership studies, and he believes the book is "replete with potential avenues for further study by leadership scholars" interested in cults.
