= John Hibbert =

John Hibbert may refer to:

- Sir J. T. Hibbert (John Tomlinson Hibbert), British barrister and politician
- John Wayne Hibbert, English boxer
- John Hibbert (cricketer), English cricketer and banker
- John Hibbert, co-founder of Bethel Church, Mansfield Woodhouse, a Christian religious organisation
