= Wohlforth =

Wohlforth is a surname. Notable people with the surname include:

- Charles Wohlforth (born 1963), author and journalist
- Nancy Wohlforth, American union leader and activist
- Tim Wohlforth (1933–2019), American trotskyist
- William Wohlforth (born 1959), professor at Dartmouth College
