= Jesse S. Miller =

American psychologist (1940–2006)

- Born: September 14, 1940; Brooklyn, New York, U.S.
- Died: March 29, 2006 (aged 65–66); California, U.S.
- Education: University of California, Berkeley (PhD); Columbia University (BA)
- Scientific career
- Fields: psychology, psychotherapy
- Workplaces: University of California, Berkeley
- Doctoral advisor: Judith Wallerstein; Margaret Singer

Jesse Stephen Miller (1940 – March 29, 2006) was a psychologist and psychodynamic psychotherapist.

== Education ==
- Ph.D., Psychology, UC Berkeley, 1970s
- B.A., Art history, Columbia University, 1961

== Biography ==
He was born in Brooklyn, New York, in 1940.

After receiving his bachelor's degree from Columbia University, Miller worked as a salesman in his family's printing business. Later, he started his own advertising agency in New York City. After realizing that he disliked the aspects of sales and persuasion, Miller sold his company. In 1971, he enrolled in the psychology program at UC Berkeley.

Miller practiced a form of psychology known as psychodynamic psychotherapy, in which patients are encouraged to openly express suppressed feelings. Notable mentors and instructors included Margaret Singer, Ph.D., and Judith Wallerstein, Ph.D.

With Paul Minsky, Miller taught a course in advanced hypnotherapeutic techniques at UC Berkeley. Miller specialized in analysis of hypnotherapy and wrote the article "The Utilization of Hypnotic Techniques in Religious Cult Conversion" in Cultic Studies Journal. Margaret Singer and Janja Lalich later referenced this article in their 1995 book Cults in Our Midst. Lalich also used the article as a reference in her 2006 book Take Back Your Life: Recovering from Cults and Abusive Relationships. His article "A Big Mental Health Problem: Finding a Compatible Therapist" in The Advocate was cited by the Institute for Social Services Alternatives.

With Singer, Miller served on the APA Task Force on Deceptive and Indirect Methods of Persuasion and Control from 1983 to 1986.

In 1985, Miller served as an expert witness in the case of People ex Rel. Roseman v. Trachtman (1985). Along with expert witnesses Margaret Singer and Richard Ofshe, Miller's affidavit stated that "Cynthia and Phillip [children of the plaintiffs] were being socially, psychologically and physically restrained of their liberty by defendant."

Miller was a lover of opera. He credited a performance of Richard Wagner's Götterdämmerung by the Seattle Opera with inspiring him to overcome alcoholism.

== Publications ==
=== Articles ===
- The Utilization of Hypnotic Techniques in Religious Cult Conversion, Cultic Studies Journal, 1986, Volume 3, Number 2, pages 243–250
- Report of the APA Task Force on Deceptive and Indirect Techniques of Persuasion and Control, November 1986.
- "A Big Mental Health Problem: Finding a Compatible Therapist.", The Advocate. January 26. 1977, pp. 16–19 8.

== See also ==
- APA Task Force on Deceptive and Indirect Techniques of Persuasion and Control
- Brainwashing
- List of cult and new religious movement researchers
- Sociological classifications of religious movements
