= New England Institute of Religious Research =

- Organization logo
- Abbreviation: NEIRR
- Formation: 1991
- Location: Massachusetts, United States
- Executive Director: Robert Pardon
- Website: www.neirr.org

New England Institute of Religious Research (NEIRR) is a countercult ministry located in Massachusetts which provides information on groups which it considers to be cults. It provides training, counseling, and assistance to individuals who are involved with such groups. The organization also runs a retreat center called the Meadow Haven Retreat and Recovery Center.

== Organization ==
=== Research institute ===
New England Institute of Religious Research was co-founded by George Mather, coauthor of Dictionary of Cults, Sects, Religions and the Occult, along with Robert Pardon. The organization was founded with the intention to provide "training in ministering to those caught up in such destructive groups". The New England Institute of Religious Research studies cult-like organizations. Pardon is a former pastor.

In 1993, Mather served as the organization's co-director, and in 2005 as its director. Pardon's article on determining when Bible study can degrade into a destructive cult was cited in the book When Prayer Fails. Pardon served as director of the organization in 1999. In 2000, Pardon served as the court-appointed guardian for 13 children of a religious sect in Attleboro, Massachusetts. The Institute worked with former members of the Attleboro sect, and in order to gain insight into the group, Pardon studied the sect's diaries. The group was led by Roland Robidoux. Attleboro District Court Judge Kenneth Nasif appointed Pardon to serve as guardian ad litem for the children that were previously removed from the group. The investigation into the Massachusetts group gained national media coverage. Pardon and the Institute has extensively studied the new religious movement, Twelve Tribes. In his capacity as director of the New England Institute of Religious Research, Pardon presented at a conference of the International Cultic Studies Association in 2001, and again in 2003 and 2004. The Institute is referenced as a resource for information on religious groups, in books including The Cult Next Door, Reflected Truth, Twisted Scriptures, and When Prayer Fails.

=== Treatment center ===
In 1999, the New England Institute of Religious Research purchased a nursing home in Lakeville, Massachusetts, intended to serve as a treatment center for up to 25 former members of cults. Pardon told The Boston Globe that residents will be given three months to reacclimate themselves to society and their families after leaving controversial groups. Other than this facility, as of 1999 the only other two such locations of treatment centers for individuals leaving cults include Wellspring in Ohio, and Odenwald Residence in Leibenstadt, Germany – both of which maintain treatment programs of two-weeks in duration.

The center opened on May 25, 2002, at a luncheon benefit celebrating the tenth anniversary of the New England Institute of Religious Research. The treatment center, called Meadow Haven, utilizes a three-pronged approach to recovery. First, individuals are assisted in identifying their religious problems and setting goals for recovery. Next, the treatment center helps them understand the dangers of being a member in a cult, and learn methods to put their life back together. Then, the final phase includes improving one's self-esteem, developing ways to reenter the community, and building a focus towards the future. Full recovery can take up to six months, though according to Pardon after a month at the treatment center individuals begin to feel better. As of 2005, Pardon served as the director of Meadow Haven.

== Commentary ==
The Chicago Sun-Times described the Institute as "a clearinghouse for cult information in Massachusetts". The Buffalo News cited the Institute for research on a controversial group known as "the Community", noting it performed "an in-depth study" of the group. The Boston Herald also cited the Institute's research, on a controversial sect in Attleboro, Massachusetts.

The Associated Press described the institute as "an anti-cult organization". The Morning Call quoted a director of the Institute, George Mather, as instructing community residents that Satanists perform rituals during Halloween to summon demons. Mather said that parents should not dress up as witches or devils for Halloween, as that would promote a wrong value system. Andrew Walsh of Trinity College in the journal Religion in the News criticized the Institute's representation of Bob and Judy Pardon citing statements from the Institute that they hold "advanced degrees in their field" which he wrote were actually standard M.Div and M.Ed. degrees respectively. Walsh criticized the Institute's labeling of groups as cults including Unitarian Universalists, The Church of Jesus Christ of Latter-day Saints, Baháʼí, Jehovah's Witnesses, and the Universal Fellowship of Metropolitan Community Churches.

== See also ==
- Anti-cult movement
- Christian countercult movement
