= Cults in Our Midst =

1996 book by Margaret Singer and Janja Lalich

- Cover
- Authors: Margaret Singer; Janja Lalich
- Language: English
- Subject: Cults
- Publisher: Jossey-Bass
- Publication date: September 1996
- Publication place: United States
- Media type: Print (Hardcover and Paperback)
- Pages: 374
- ISBN: 978-0-7879-0051-9
- OCLC: 35979557
- Preceded by: Captive Hearts, Captive Minds (Lalich co-author)
- Followed by: Crazy Therapies (Singer); Bounded Choice (Lalich)

Cults in Our Midst: The Hidden Menace in Our Everyday Lives is a study of cults by Margaret Singer and Janja Lalich, Ph.D., with a foreword by Robert Jay Lifton.

== Overview ==
In the book, Singer outlined several major categories of cults as well as their followers.

Singer writes:

In this book I will use the term cult and cultic group to refer to any one of a large number of groups that have sprung up in our society and that are similar in the way that they originate, their power structure, and their governance. Cults range from the relatively benign to those that exercise extraordinary control over members' lives and use thought-reform processes to influence and control members. While the conduct of certain cults causes nonmembers to criticize them, the term cult is not in itself pejorative but simply descriptive. It denotes a group that forms around a person who claims to have a special mission or knowledge, which they will share with those who turn over most of their decision making to that self-appointed leader.

=== Publication history ===
The book was reprinted by Jossey-Bass in 1996 in hardcover format. A 1997 Spanish was issued as Las Sectas Entre Nosotros ('The Sects Among Us'), and in German, as Sekten: Wie Menschen ihre Freiheit verlieren und wiedergewinnen können ('Sects: How people can lose and regain their freedom').

In 2003, a revised edition of the book titled Cults in Our Midst: The Continuing Fight Against Their Hidden Menace was published in paperback form by John Wiley & Sons, without Janja Lalich listed as co-author.
