= Bethel Church, Mansfield Woodhouse =

Christian organization in England and United States

Bethel Church and King's Chapel
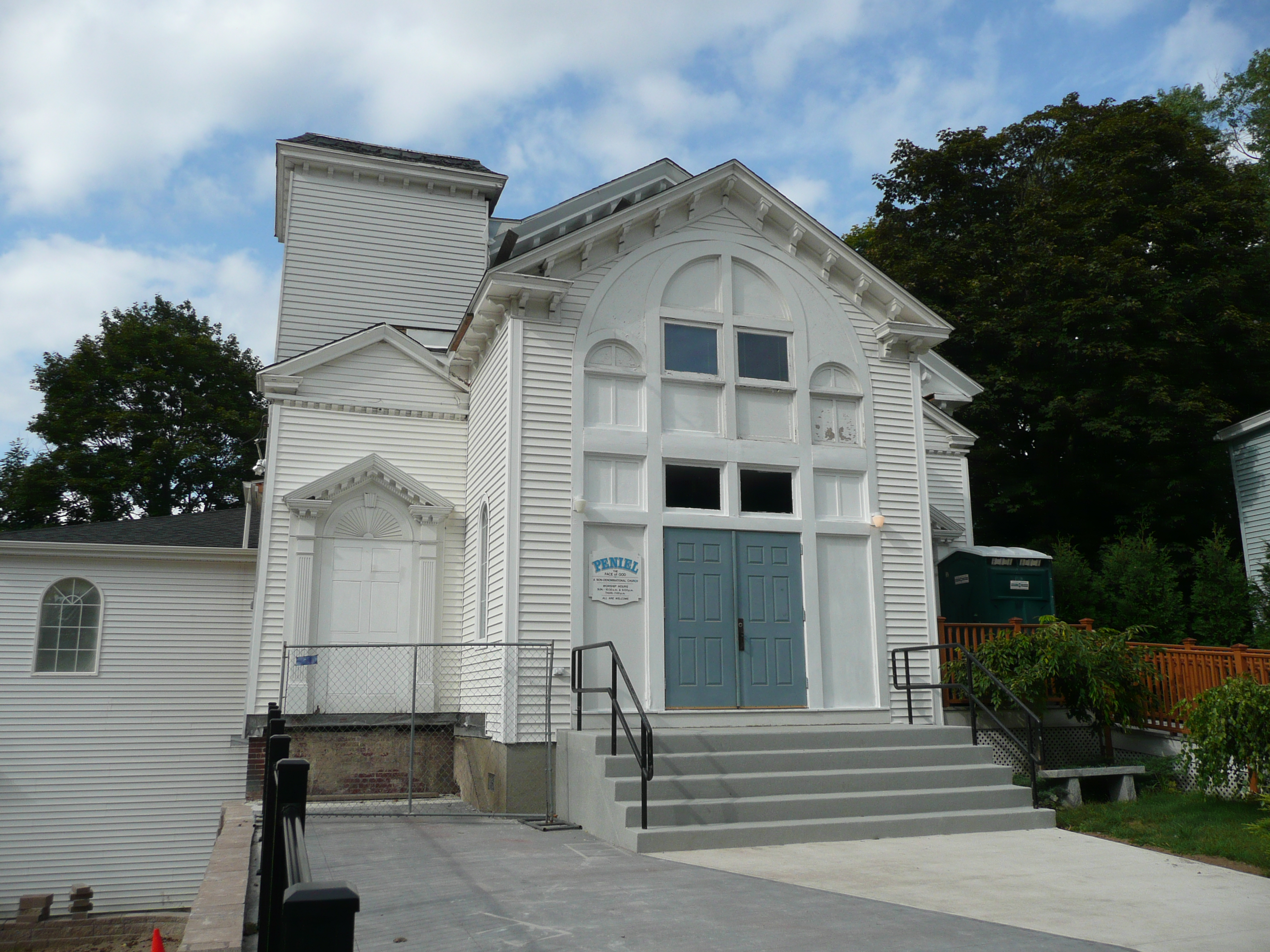
- King's Chapel in Norwich, Connecticut (2009)
- Type: Religious organisation
- Location(s): Mansfield Woodhouse; Norwich, Connecticut
- Region served: Mansfield, England; Connecticut, US
- Official language: English
- Key individuals: John Hibbert, Jean Spademan, Sam J. Wibberley
- Affiliations: Christianity

Bethel Church, also called Bethel Interdenominational Church, is a Christian religious organisation based in Mansfield Woodhouse, England, founded by John Hibbert and Jean Spademan. It has a sister church, King's Chapel, in Norwich, Connecticut. Within the movement, Spademan was known by the name "Syro" – "an obscure Biblical reference to a Syro-Phoenician woman who appeals to Jesus to save her daughter from a demon".

== Founders ==
=== Jean Spademan ===
In 1999, Spademan had six children and over twelve grandchildren. She had children early in life and did not have much money. Her youngest daughter was adopted from Honduras – Spademan had the idea to begin a connection between Bethel Church and the Honduras orphanage Finca de los Niños. Spademan and the church had a goal to build a new orphanage, but they gave up on these plans in the mid-1980s. Spademan's residences on Ley Lane were owned by members of the church.

In an interview with the Daily Express in 2000, Spademan commented on claims by others that she said she was a prophet: "I don't believe I'm a prophet. I never said ... once I may have verged on it." Hibbert acknowledged Spademan asserted she was a prophet, and said she made such statements "only once as a means to an end in a particular circumstance". Hibbert went on to note: "I would say she fits into the prophet category (of the ministry) but not in the way the press is making it out to be, but because she is behind the scenes and she communes with God a great deal." In 1999 Spademan ruled both churches, in England and in Connecticut, through constant contact with church pastors. She communicated either in person or by telephone with Sam J. Wibberley, a pastor at the church in Connecticut.

=== John Hibbert ===
Hibbert said he wished "to know god" since he was a young child. Hibbert stated in an interview: "As a boy of 11, 12, and 13 they could not keep me away from it. I was in every single service soaking up the preaching, listening to these missionaries tell their stories. I can remember standing in these congregations ... and with tears streaming down my face and saying, 'Lord I want to do whatever you want me to do in this world. I want to be your servant for the rest of my life.'"

He was raised in central England, and attended a technical college where he received education as a draftsman. Hibbert served as an ordained minister in a Pentecostal church, and rose to the level of assistant minister in Rotherham, in a parish of the organisation Assembly of God. Hibbert is married with three daughters and an adopted boy originally from Honduras. He met Spademan in 1972: "I saw a hesitation in her eyes. I sensed she was in need. And so that was it." Hibbert commented on claims that individuals were pressured to donate funds to his organisation: "Certainly no pressure was ever put on anybody (to give)," he said. "You have never met a more selfless giving group of people than the people in this church and that includes this ministry."

== England ==
In 2000, Spademan rarely attended services. Spademan learned of a church member's lesbian relationship in 2000, and decided to split up the pair by sending one of the girls to live at the church in Connecticut. "Syro told me she knew from God that I was doing this sinful and evil thing. I was shouted at and screamed at, shaken, prayed over and had a Bible pushed against my chest. I was upset, confused and scared," said the girl that was moved to Connecticut. The girl eventually moved back to England and left the organisation.

Along with Hibbert, another pastor at the church in England was Stephen Jeffs. Hibbert and Jeffs believed they were relaying the word of God to their congregation, as given to Spademan. Church members give ten percent of their earnings to the organisation. Members of the church participate in "deliverance" rituals, where church leadership assert that they have been informed of followers' violent and sinful thoughts. Followers are encouraged to dedicate their lives to the organisation and shun family members.

Hope International is a tax-exempt charity organisation run by Bethel Church, with a stated goal of helping individuals from Honduras. It was first registered as a charity in Britain in June 1990. British government records show that approximately US$290,000 was raised from 1995 to 1997. Over fifty-percent of the funds raised for Hope International went to church leadership and members in the form of administrative costs, employees' salaries, and lodging. As of 1999, Hibbert and Spademan were listed as trustees of Hope International, along with Spademan's son-in-law Stephen Jeffs, and her daughter Christine.

In 2009, church pastor Christopher Jenkinson, along with his wife Jennifer, planned to climb Snowdon to raise funding for poor children in Zambia. The church sent individuals to Zambia in July 2009 to assist in construction work for a missionary-led school. "I can't do much to help, but I can walk, so if people would like to sponsor me, every pound counts," said pastor Jenkinson. The school in Zambia serves as a location for 300 children to receive free education – the children also receive food free of charge each school day.

Early in 2018, the church building was advertised as for sale. As of June 2018, the International Church Mansfield has been placed into the hands of liquidators.

== Connecticut ==
As of 1999, one of the three pastors at King's Chapel in Norwich, Connecticut was Sam J. Wibberley, who also owned a business called "Sam Wibberley Tire", and lived in Jewett City, Connecticut. Wibberley graduated from Albion College in 1973. In the 1980s, Wibberley's organisation the Dayspring Church of God became affiliated with the Bethel Church. King's Chapel has tax exempt status, which was originally granted to Dayspring Church of God in 1981. Wibberley and his wife Cynthia often travel to Bethel Church in England to visit church members there. As of 1999, Wibberley's son Christopher was married and was employed as an auto mechanic. John V. Monahan Jr. served as a pastor of the church in 1999, along with James Oakley, and Kevin F. Hamel served as youth minister.

Church services include singing accompanied by guitar music. A church member described the preaching in the service as "energized and forceful". Church values include cleanliness of one's home, and that an individual's property was seen as shared ownership with other members of the church. Church members are often quoted the Bible verse "For as he thinketh in his heart, so is he", Proverbs 23:7. Sinful thoughts are seen by some as being equated with the sin itself.

Both Wibberley, and his counterpart Hibbert in England, believe that Jean Spademan has the "gift of prophecy". Members of the King's Chapel community share possessions including money, houses, and cars. They work at the church for free, and this is seen as a sign of their faith in the movement. One of the church's mottos was "You can't outgive God". Members of the organisation live in Jewett City; church pastors encourage their followers to live there. Spademan believed that the Lord thought Jewett City was "the Jewel City", and the chosen city of God.

On 19 December 1987, a member of King's Chapel, 29-year-old Ron Allen, committed suicide shortly after being persuaded by members of the church to sell his house. "Selling that house was not what Ronald wanted. He said he was brainwashed," said his mother Edith Bolles. "They told him his house was evil because it was materialism. He was submitting himself to materialism, and he needed to get rid of that materialism. ... And by the same token, they wanted the money," said his sister Caron Wunderlich.

In December 1994, church member Martha Davis attempted to commit suicide by ingesting painkillers. She had been instructed by church pastor Kevin F. Hamel that "the Lord had informed prophet Jean Spademan" that a couple and their three daughters had to move into Davis's apartment to live with her and her son. Davis cared for the daughters for years, but felt she was neglecting her own son. "I can't tell you how devastated I was. It was such a heartbreak for me. But I was told it was God's perfect will. We were told over and over we have to surrender to Him," she said. Her son moved to England in 1994, and when Davis asked for time off from caring for the couple's daughters, Pastor Sam J. Wibberley instead instructed her to apologise to the girls. She requested that her son return from England, but Pastor John Hibbert said he would stay there because her attempt to kill herself "had ruined much of what they had accomplished with him".

Sallie Bowen, a church member with her husband from 1980 to 1998, told The New London Day that the organisation's pastors and leader Syro held a large amount of influence over their followers. Bowen said that Sam Wibberley instructed her "the Lord had told Syro I wanted to have an affair with Syro's granddaughter's husband". Bowen denied these thoughts, but Wibberley insisted: "You’re trying to fool us, but you can’t fool God." Bowen ended up telling her husband about the incident after being told to do so by Wibberley: "It hurt him. They hurt people’s marriages. They cause divisions. We had been married several years at that point. I loved him. I never had any inclination not to be faithful to my husband. But here they are making me confess that I did," said Bowen.

== British MP calls for group to be placed on register ==
In 2000, after critical reporting on the organisation exposed controversial practices by the group, British MP for Mansfield Alan Meale publicly requested that such religious groups and cults be placed in a register. Meale noted that if employers used the psychological methods used by Bethel Church management, employees would be able to request a significant amount of financial compensation.

"There needs to be a register to protect the people involved in these movements, their relatives and the communities in which they exist. Everyone, from parents, to social services and neighbours should be allowed to know what these organisations are. They are usually very secretive and impose huge pressures on the people in them. A register should also lay open the church's business dealings and its aims and objectives," said Meale.

== Analysis ==
Dr. Martyn Percy of the Lincoln Theological Institute for the Study of Religion and Society, an authority on new religious movements, commented on the organisation's nature of control: "It seems to me to be a fascinating form of religious control exercised on people. If you really think people know what you think, you just don’t dare step out of line. It becomes intolerable. What is absolutely unique about this church is a woman being not just a figurehead, but the prophetic leader of it."

Lonnie D. Kliever, chairman of the religion department at Southern Methodist University in Dallas, Texas, said that he did not observe evidence of brainwashing within the church. He compared individuals devoted to strict organisations such as King's Chapel to "misguided victims", commenting: It is like getting involved in a bad marriage. Some find it preferable to stay."

Mary Alice Chrnalogar, author of the 1997 book on cults, Twisted Scriptures, said she has heard of the group, and compared it to other religious groups she has dealt with: "I’m very familiar with that group. It’s no different from any other cult I have worked with."

The director of the New England Institute of Religious Research in Middleboro, Massachusetts, Robert Pardon, analysed statements from ex-members of the King's Chapel organisation. Pardon stated that the group "fits the classic profile" of an abusive religious organisation. Pardon commented on Spademan's control of the group: "If you accept the premise that she hears from God and is always right, then you have no safeguards, no accountability from abuse. This is pretty scary stuff."
