= On the Edge: Political Cults Right and Left =

2000 book by Tourish & Wohlforth

On the Edge
- Hardcover edition
- Author: Dennis Tourish, Tim Wohlforth
- Language: English
- Subject: cults, political cults, politics
- Publisher: M.E. Sharpe
- Publication date: September 2000
- Publication place: United States
- Media type: Hardcover
- Pages: 246
- ISBN: 978-0-7656-0639-6
- OCLC: 43434639
- Dewey Decimal: 303.48/4 21
- LC Class: HN17 .T69 2000

On the Edge: Political Cults Right and Left is a 2000 non-fiction book about political cults, written by Dennis Tourish and Tim Wohlforth.

== Main points ==
On the Edge discusses the role of 'cults' and political cults in politics, as well as describing some of the history involving individuals such as Lyndon LaRouche and Fred Newman. Other individuals and groups discussed include Marlene Dixon, the Christian Identity movement, Posse Comitatus, Re-evaluation Counseling, Synanon, and Aryan Nation. Additionally, the book discusses actions of Trotskyist groups, such as the CWI in the United Kingdom particularly those led by Ted Grant and Gerry Healy.

== Authors ==
Tourish is a professor of Leadership and Organisation Studies at Royal Holloway, University of London and was a leading member of the Irish wing of the Militant group from the mid-1970s to the mid-1980s. He has recently published a new book: The Dark Side of Transformational Leadership: A Critical Perspective, in which he revisits some of his earlier criticisms of the Militant group. Wohlforth was the author of The Prophet's Children: Travels on the American Left (1995) about his experiences in American Trotskyism from the 1950s through the 1970s; he was also an author of detective fiction. He was the leader from the mid-1960s to the mid-1970s of a United States Trotskyist group, the Workers League, which was affiliated with the UK-based Workers Revolutionary Party (one of the groups profiled in On the Edge).

== Reviews ==
In his review of On the Edge, Bob Pitt, editor of the online Marxist journal WhatNext and a former member of one of the groups profiled in the book, the Workers Revolutionary Party (WRP), stated that the "central purpose of the book is to mount a slanderous attack on the revolutionary left, which often goes further than anything you might read in even the most anti-socialist sections of the bourgeois press." Pitt describes the authors as "two embittered former members of far left groups."

Pitt states that the authors "seem immune to the idea that far left sects – even the most cult-like – can occasionally play some kind of progressive role in wider society."

In the same review, however, Pitt stated that in the case of one leftist group profiled in the book, his own former WRP, "there are grounds for viewing it as a type of cult. It featured a ruthlessly authoritarian internal regime presided over by an all-powerful, all-knowing leader, who maintained his position by subjecting cadres to psychological manipulation and physical and sexual abuse." Pitt also termed the Lyndon LaRouche organization an "actual cult."

In 2003, WhatNext? republished the 1998 article by Tourish from the Cultic Studies Journal which had served as the basis for the chapter of On the Edge on one of the leaders of Militant tendency, Ted Grant (The Lonely Passion of Ted Grant). Pitt criticized this On the Edge chapter in his review by stating: "When it comes to the Militant Tendency, the authors’ attempt to apply the cult paradigm breaks down. A moment's consideration would reveal that the notion of Ted Grant presiding over a regime comparable to Healy's is laughable."

The What Next? reprint of Tourish included a lengthy new introduction by him defending On the Edge and stating: "Some people have objected to the term "cult", even if they agreed with the substantive points that the paper makes about the Militant tendency's internal regime. This is unfortunate. The word cult is not a term of abuse, as this paper tries to explain. It is nothing more than a shorthand expression for a particular set of practices that have been observed in a variety of dysfunctional organisations."

Nevertheless, Pitt argues that Tourish's application of the word cult "expands the definition of the term to the point where it becomes pretty well useless."

Cult academic Janja Lalich positively reviewed the book.
