= APA Task Force on Deceptive and Indirect Methods of Persuasion and Control =

The APA Task Force on Deceptive and Indirect Methods (or Techniques) of Persuasion and Control (DIMPAC/DITPACT) was formed at the request of the American Psychological Association (APA) in 1983. The APA asked Margaret Singer, a leading theorist in cults and coercive persuasion, to chair a task force to "expose cult methods and tactics".

== Summary ==
The DIMPAC report claimed to document how organizations and new religious movements, which it entirely labeled as cults, used brainwashing to recruit and control members, and condemned this.

== Members of the task force ==
In1986, the members of the task force were:

- Margaret Singer, Chair
- Harold Goldstein, National Institute of Mental Health
- Michael Langone, American Family Foundation
- Jesse S. Miller
- Maurice K. Temerlin, Clinical Psychology Consultants, Inc.
- Louis Jolyon West, University of California Los Angeles

== Dismissal of the DIMPAC report ==
On May 11, 1987, the APA Board of Social and Ethical Responsibility for Psychology (BSERP) rejected the DIMPAC report because "[i]n general, the report lacks the scientific rigor and evenhanded critical approach necessary for APA imprimatur."

Along with the rejection memo came two letters from external advisers to the APA who reviewed the report (the APA did not make its internal review public):

- One of the letters, from Benjamin Beit-Hallahmi of the University of Haifa, stated among other comments that "lacking psychological theory, the report resorts to sensationalism in the style of certain tabloids" and that "the term 'brainwashing' is not a recognized theoretical concept, and is just a sensationalist 'explanation' more suitable to 'cultists' and revival preachers. It should not be used by psychologists, since it does not explain anything". Beit-Hallahmi recommended not making the report public.
- The second letter, from Jeffrey D. Fisher, said that the report "seems to be unscientific in tone, and biased in nature. It draws conclusions, which in many cases do not mesh well with the evidence presented. At times, the reasoning seems flawed to the point of being almost ridiculous. In fact, the report sometimes seems to be characterized by the use of deceptive, indirect techniques of persuasion and control – the very thing it is investigating".

The memorandum concludes with "Finally, after much consideration, BSERP does not believe that we have sufficient information available to guide us in taking a position on this issue."

Margaret Singer and her professional associate sociologist Richard Ofshe subsequently sued the APA in 1992 for defamation, frauds, aiding and abetting, and conspiracy—and lost in 1994. Subsequently, judges did not accept Singer as an expert witness in cases alleging brainwashing and mind control.

=== Impact of DIMPAC report dismissal ===
The task force completed its final report in November 1986. In May 1987, the APA Board of Social and Ethical Responsibility for Psychology (BSERP) rejected the DIMPAC final report; stating that the report "lack[ed] the scientific rigor and evenhanded critical approach necessary for APA imprimatur". The BSERP board requested that the task-force members not distribute or publicize the report without indicating that the Board found the report unacceptable, and cautioned the members of the task force against using their past appointment to it to imply BSERP or APA support or approval of the positions advocated in the report.

In August 1988, the District of Columbia Court of Appeals reversed part of the case Kropinski v. World Plan Executive Council, based on the lack of scientific support for the theories presented by Margaret Singer during her testimony as an expert witness.

In 1989, Robin George v. International Society for Krishna Consciousness appeared in the California Fourth District Court of Appeal. This resulted in a rejection of Singer's testimony on the basis that the brainwashing theory of false imprisonment constituted an attempt to premise tort liability on religious practices that the plaintiff believed to be objectionable, and that such premise appeared inconsistent with the First Amendment.

In 1990, District Court Judge Lowell Jensen excluded Singer's testimony in United States v. Fishman. According to J. Gordon Melton, upon reading the arguments against Singer and Ofshe's theories on brainwashing and coercive tactics, the court denied their expert testimony.

In 1991, the Patrick Ryan v. Maharishi Yogi case was filed in the US District Court in Washington, DC. Judge Oliver Gasch refused to allow Singer to testify, based on the premises that Singer and Ofshe's theory did not enjoy substantial scientific approval and was therefore not admissible as the basis of expert opinion.

== Amicus curiae brief ==
Before the task force had submitted its final report, the APA together with a group of scholars submitted an amicus curiae brief in a pending case, Molko v. Holy Spirit Association for the Unification of World Christianity before the California Supreme Court. The case was submitted on February 10, 1987, and involved issues of brainwashing and coercive persuasion related to the Unification Church. The brief portrayed Singer's hypotheses as uninformed speculations based on skewed data.

On March 24, 1987, the APA filed a motion to withdraw its signature from this brief, as it considered the conclusion premature in view of the ongoing work of the DIMPAC task force. The amicus as such continued because the co-signed scholars did not withdraw their signatures. These included: Jeffrey Hadden, Eileen Barker, David Bromley and J. Gordon Melton, Joseph Bettis, Durwood Foster, William R. Garret, Richard D. Kahone, Timothy Miller, John Young, James T. Richardson, Ray L. Hart, Benton Johnson, Franklin Littell, Newton Malony, Donald E. Miller, Mel Prosen, Thomas Robbins, and Huston Smith.

== Margaret Singer v. APA (RICO lawsuit) ==
When the APA's BSERP declined to accept the DIMPAC findings, Singer sued the APA and other scholars in 1992 for "defamation, frauds, aiding and abetting and conspiracy" under the Racketeer Influenced and Corrupt Organizations Act (RICO) and lost in 1994. The lawsuit alleged that several top executives at the APA and ASA attempted to destroy careers, charging that from 1986 to 1992 they resorted to improper influence of witnesses in state court litigations, filed untrue affidavits, attempted to obstruct justice in federal litigations, deceived federal judges, and committed wire and mail fraud. The lawsuit also cited a Washington state law firm and twelve other scholars as defendants. Ofshe and Singer said that these actions damaged their reputations as forensic experts in the fields of psychology and sociology in the area of coercive persuasion, preventing their testimony against cults, and specified acts of collusion between several of the defendants and cult groups.

The court summons filed by Singer and Ofshe's lawyer described the rejection of the DIMPAC report by the APA's BSERP as a "rejection of the scientific validity of the theory of coercive persuasion".

The court dismissed the case on the basis that the claims of defamation, frauds, aiding and abetting and conspiracy constituted a dispute over the application of the First Amendment to a public debate over academic and professional matters. The court stated that one could characterize the parties as the opposing camps in a long-standing debate over certain theories in the field of psychology, and that the plaintiffs could not establish deceit with reference to representations made to other parties in the lawsuit.

In a further ruling, James R. Lamden ordered Ofshe and Singer to pay $80,000 in attorneys' fees under California's SLAPP suit law, which penalizes those who harass others for exercising their First Amendment rights. At that time Singer and Ofshe declared their intention to sue Michael Flomenhaft, the lawyer who represented them in the case, for malpractice.

== See also ==
- Anti-cult movement
- Brainwashing
- Cult
- List of cult and new religious movement researchers
