= King's Chapel (disambiguation) =

King's Chapel is a church in Boston, Massachusetts.

King's Chapel may also refer:

- King's College Chapel, Aberdeen, chapel to King's College of the University of Aberdeen
- King's College Chapel, Cambridge, chapel to King's College of the University of Cambridge
- King's Chapel, Gibraltar
- King's College London Chapel, the main College Chapel at King's College London
- King's Chapel (Connecticut), Norwich, Connecticut
- Savoy Chapel, King's Chapel of the Savoy
