= Turner Publishing Company =

American publishing company

- Founded: 1984
- Country of origin: United States
- Headquarters location: Nashville, Tennessee
- Distribution: Ingram Publisher Services
- Key people: Todd Bottorff, President and Publisher
- Imprints: Turner, Iroquois Press, Ramsey & Todd, Wiley, Ancestry, Fieldstone Alliance, Cumberland House Press, Hunter House, Jewish Lights, SkyLight Paths, Christian Journeys, Gemstone Press, Gurze Books, Keylight Books, West Margin Press
- Official website: turnerpublishing.com

Turner Publishing Company is an American independent book publisher based in Nashville, Tennessee.

== History ==
Turner Publishing Company was founded in 1984 in Paducah, Kentucky.

From 1984 to 2005 the company published specialty and commemorative titles focusing on history. During this period, Turner Publishing Company produced over 500 titles in military history, local history, and organizational history.

In 2002, Todd Bottorff purchased the company and moved it to Nashville, Tennessee. Turner launched its move into trade publishing in 2005 with a program of regional history titles. A series of history photography books called "Historic Photos" was launched.

In 2009, Turner purchased over 400 titles from Cumberland House. The following year, Turner acquired the book division of Ancestry.com, as well as the assets of Fieldstone Alliance, a publisher of business books for non-profit organizations. Turner went on to acquire selected assets of Providence House, including the rights to Eugenia Price's works.

Turner Publishing announced its partnership with Ingram Publisher Services in December 2011 to take over distribution services beginning in January 2012.

In April 2013, Turner acquired over 1,000 titles from John Wiley & Sons, including the backlist of Howell Book House. A year later, Turner acquired Hunter House Publishers. In 2016, Turner acquired Jewish Lights Publishing and three other imprints from LongHill Partners. In 2018, Turner acquired Gurze Books.

In 2022, Turner acquired West Margin Press from Ingram Content Group.
