= Gürze Books =

American publishing company

- Parent company: Turner Publishing Company
- Founded: 1980
- Founders: Leigh Cohn and Lindsey Hall
- Country of origin: United States
- Headquarters location: Carlsbad, California
- Publication types: Books
- Nonfiction topics: eating disorders
- Official website: www.gurzebooks.com

Gürze Books, LLC is a Carlsbad, California based publishing company specializing on books addressing eating disorders and body image. It has been an imprint of Turner Publishing Company since 2018.

== Company overview ==
Gürze Books has published more than 40 books by over 30 authors who are experts in the field of eating disorders, addressing topics including anorexia nervosa, bulimia nervosa, binge eating, eating disorders in males, self-esteem, sexual abuse, and recovery. Gürze has also published an intimate biography of Hilde Bruch Unlocking the Golden Cage chronicling her historic contributions to modern psychology and work introducing anorexia nervosa to popular culture. Gürze also manages a bimonthly newsletter for professionals focusing on current research and treatment called Eating Disorders Review which has been in publication for over 20 years, and creates and distributes the annual Eating Disorders Resource Catalogue, a widely used resource in the eating disorders field. The catalogue includes names and addresses of national eating disorders organizations, listings of prominent treatment facilities, as well as a comprehensive listing of books from the field.

== Company history ==
=== Background ===
The company was founded in 1980 by husband and wife, Leigh Cohn and Lindsey Hall, to publish their 31-page booklet Eat Without Fear on October 15, 1980, bulimia nervosa drawing from Hall's experience recovering from bulimia. The booklet was later reworked and included in Bulimia: A Guide to Recovery, which is cited as the first self-help book about bulimia.

=== The Origin of "Gürze" ===
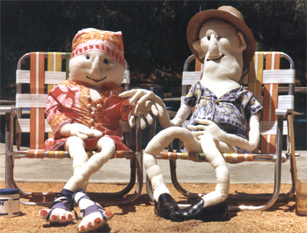
Original soft sculpture dolls, Gürze featured on left

The word “Gürze” came to Lindsey in a dream in 1976 from which she awoke and wrote, “I met a woman whose name was Gürze. She had mink hair and was inhabited by seven animals.” Using original batik designs and surgical gauze, she created a soft-sculpture doll of Gürze, which led to the sales of more than 250,000 Gürze Designs dolls. The dolls were featured on TV shows, such as “The Price is Right” (December 12, 1979) and “Mork and Mindy” and were pictured in magazines with celebrities such as Robin Williams, Chaka Khan, and Arthur Ashe. Although Lindsey did not speak any languages that used an umlaut, she was told that in a remote region of Bavaria, “Gürze” is used as a greeting with the literal translation, “I greet the God in you.”

== Recognition ==
Hall and Cohn have been influential in bringing eating disorders to public attention, and have received recognition for their contributions to the field. On February 3, 1981, Lindsey appeared on “Hour Magazine” becoming the first person to discuss bulimia on national television. They are on the Founders Council of the National Eating Disorders Association, members of Academy of Eating Disorders, received the 2005 Award for Service from the Eating Disorders Coalition, and were given the Lori Irving Award for Excellence in Eating Disorders Prevention and Awareness by the National Eating Disorders Association in 2008. Additionally, they were given honorary Certified Eating Disorders Specialist designations by the International Association of Eating Disorders Professionals in 2007, and Leigh served as president of the Publishers Marketing Association from 1992–1993 (now the Independent Book Publishers Association), a non-profit trade association of 3,000 publishing companies throughout the United States.

Cohn has distinguished himself as one of the leading experts on males and eating disorders through his writings, media interviews (with MSNBC, the New Yorker, CBS News, USA Today, the New York Daily News, and other sources), and numerous speaking appearances at professional conferences and universities (including Ohio State University, Iowa State University, University of Nebraska, California State University Northridge, and many others). His book, Making Weight: Men’s Conflicts with Food, Weight, Shape & Appearance was published by Gürze Books and coauthored by Arnold Andersen, MD, an extensively published researcher and professor emeritus at the University of Iowa, who previously wrote Males and Eating Disorders and articles on eating disorders in more than 40 professional journals, and by Thomas Holbrook, MD, a psychiatrist and recovering anorexic.
