= John Hibbert (cricketer) =

English cricketer and schoolmaster

Personal information
- Full name: John Calvert Hibbert
- Born: 4 August 1853; Chalfont St Peter, Buckinghamshire, England
- Died: 23 March 1929 (aged 75); Saint-Raphaël, Var, France
- Batting: Right-handed
- Relatives: Charles Calvert (uncle)

Domestic team information
- Years: Team
- 1881–1882: Marylebone Cricket Club

Career statistics
Competition	First-class
Matches	2
Runs scored	0
Batting average	0.00
100s/50s	–/–
Top score	0
Catches/stumpings	–/–
- Source: Cricinfo, 6 June 2021

John Calvert Hibbert (4 August 1853 – 23 March 1929) was an English first-class cricketer and banker.

The son of Leicester Hibbert, he was born in August 1853 at Chalfont St Peter, Buckinghamshire. He studied at the Royal Agricultural College at Cirencester, but became a banker. He played first-class cricket for the Marylebone Cricket Club making two appearances against Hampshire in 1881 and Somerset in 1882. He struggled as a batsman, being dismissed for a duck in all three of his innings' in first-class cricket. Hibbert died in Southern France at Saint-Raphaël while staying with relatives in March 1929. His uncle, Charles Calvert, was also a first-class cricketer.
