= Mystics and Messiahs =

Book on American cults

- Cover
- Author: Philip Jenkins
- Language: English
- Subject: Cults
- Publisher: Oxford University Press
- Publication date: 2000
- Pages: 294
- ISBN: 0-19-512744-7
- OCLC: 41231449
- Dewey Decimal: 200'.973
- LC Class: BL2525 .J46 2000

Mystics and Messiahs: Cults and New Religions in American History is a 2000 nonfiction book by historian of religion Philip Jenkins. It was published by Oxford University Press. The book argues that the anti-cult movement in America starting in the 1970s extends farther back in American history to at least the seventeenth century. Nineteenth-century new religious movements like the Shakers, Mormons, Jehovah's Witnesses, Spiritualism, Christian Science, etc. had countermovements that resembled recent anti-cult movements. Anti-cult rhetoric, like the brainwashing thesis, was generated in the nineteenth century and later revived during the Cold War. Jenkins identified a cycle of cult resurgence and anti-cult reaction throughout US history, and he predicted that in 2010 there would be a cult resurgence typified by that cycle.

== Reception ==
Daniel W. Howe for the Journal of Ecclesiastical History called the book an "engaging examination of [American religious] diversity". Michael J. McClymond in his review for the Journal of the American Academy of Religion says that "[n]ot many books deserve the epithet fascinating, but this is one of them". John Orme Mills for New Blackfriars called the book a "remarkably balanced survey" of controversial religious groups throughout US history. Jeffrey Kaplan for Utopian Studies that "the text is a valuable—and perhaps indispensable—discussion of the historic dimensions of new religious movements in America". Evelyn A. Kirkley for Church History notes that the argument is different from other historians of American religion because of its framing of cult history in terms of countermovements. Ray Olson for Booklist notes that the book has a "healthily nonjudgmental attitude" towards cults and the anti-cult movement. A reviewer for Publishers Weekly called the work full of "cultural breadth and fresh insights into the role of new religions" in US history. Thomas Robbins for Nova Religio called the book a "scintillating analysis of the dynamics of recurrent waves of cult formation and anticult excitation".

Some have criticized Jenkins's book for its consistent use of the word cult and strange religious taxonomy. McClymond writes that "[o]ther groups [treated in the work], such as black Muslims and Theosophists, may be small in numbers and yet lack the authoritarianism and separatism that characterize the classic 'cult'". Kirkley made similar comments in their review. Others have criticized Jenkins for not being critical enough of cults in his work. For example, Brett W. Jagger for the John Whitmer Historical Society Journal believes that Jenkins "swings too far toward the side of the cult in his treatment of alleged cultist atrocities". Mary Farrell Bednarowski for CrossCurrents warns that readers "who are not familiar with the major literature on new religions will want to stay alert for occasional inaccuracies in the text", but she overall believes that Jenkins's argument is well substantiated.

Richard Lynn Buchman for the Journal of Mormon History calls the book "helpful" yet "discouraging" for Mormon readers. Kaplan also noted that Jenkins's conclusion that the attribution of the 1980s Satanic child abuse scare to the Manson Family murders and Jonestown are questionable. John Moryl for Library Journal calls the work "important" but criticized it as "not necessarily a light reading".
