= Deadly Cults =

2003 book by Robert L. Snow

- Cover of the first edition
- Author: Robert L. Snow
- Language: English
- Subject: Cults
- Publisher: Praeger Publishers
- Publication date: November 30, 2003
- Publication place: United States
- Media type: Print (Hardcover)
- Pages: 248
- ISBN: 0-275-98052-9
- OCLC: 52602822
- Dewey Decimal: 209/.024/364 22
- LC Class: BL65.C7 S66 2003
- Preceded by: The Complete Guide to Personal and Home Safety: What You Need to Know
- Followed by: Murder 101: Homicide and Its Investigation

Deadly Cults: The Crimes of True Believers is a book about cults by Robert L. Snow. It was published November 30, 2003, by Praeger Publishers in hardcover format. Snow, a retired police captain and former commander of the homicide branch of the Indianapolis Police Department, has authored several other books on crime including SWAT Teams and Technology and Law Enforcement.

Snow primarily relied on published material for reference, but also includes quotes from witnesses and experts. The book includes nine chapters and is structured by type of group. Snow discusses how individuals are led to conform to the "rules" of the groups, and a chapter of the book includes advice on how to avoid joining them. Deadly Cults received a positive review in Booklist, and a reviewer for Library Journal said it "belongs in all public libraries".

== Contents ==
In the book's nine chapters, Snow presents case studies of controversial groups and movements and outlines how individuals are led to follow the "rules" of these organizations. The chapters are structured by the types of groups, such as "Religious Cults", "Occult Cults", "Millennial Cults", "New Age Cults", "UFO Cults", "Doomsday Cults", and "Suicide Cults". Snow primarily relies on published material for references as opposed to first-hand reporting. The majority of the book's references are secondary sources including magazines and newspaper articles, though Snow does also include quotes from experts and witnesses.

Groups including the Branch Davidians, Church Universal and Triumphant, the Church of Satan, the Movement for the Restoration of the Ten Commandments, the Peoples Temple, Heaven's Gate, and the Unification Church are discussed in the book. Snow recounts results from a study of 353 former members of 48 cults in the United States, who recounted experiences after leaving their respective groups. After leaving the groups, 23 percent of former members stated they had attempted suicide, 63 percent had suicidal ideation, and 93 percent had experienced anxiety attacks. Snow devotes a chapter to deprogramming and advice on how individuals can avoid joining these groups from the outset.

== Reception ==
David Pitt wrote favorably of the book in a review in Booklist, and described it as an "insightful look at cults and their charismatic leaders". A review in Reference & Research Book News commented that Snow: "does not bother with groups that are demonized as cults merely because they diverge from someone else's idea of truth or proper deportment, but focuses on those that are responsible for major crimes such as murder and torture". The book received a positive review in Library Journal, and Michael Sawyer wrote: "Well written and researched, this book belongs in all public libraries and should be considered in academic libraries where there is an interest in cult history."

== See also ==
- Cults
- Destructive cult
- Zealot: A Book About Cults
