= Crazy Therapies =

1996 book by Margaret Singer and Janja Lalich

"Crazy" Therapies
- Cover of the first edition
- Authors: Margaret Singer; Janja Lalich
- Language: English
- Subject: Psychotherapy
- Publisher: Jossey-Bass
- Publication date: 1996
- Publication place: United States
- Media type: Print (Hardcover)
- Pages: 263
- ISBN: 0-7879-0278-0
- OCLC: 34699480
- Dewey Decimal: 616.89/14 20
- LC Class: RC480.515 .S56 1996

"Crazy" Therapies: What Are They? Do They Work? is a book by the psychologist Margaret Singer and the sociologist Janja Lalich. It was published by Jossey-Bass in 1996.

== Content ==
Singer and Lalich's intended audience is psychiatric and psychotherapy patients. They discuss a list of severe warning signs that psychotherapy patients should pay attention to, regardless of the psychotherapist's credentials or reputation. They discuss these in detail and quantify them into ten classic behaviour patterns. These include potential sexual abuse; asking the patient to perform menial chores; discussing the psychotherapist's own problems in detail; asking the patient to cut off relations with friends and family; diagnosing the patient's condition before thoroughly discussing the issue; claiming the patient must be hypnotized in order to sort through past memories; treating patients as if they all have the same psychological root cause of illness; claiming to have a magical miracle technique; utilizing a checklist to find out if the patient has an illness that the psychotherapist specializes in; and finally, demanding that the patient accept certain religious, metaphysical or pseudoscientific beliefs in order to continue psychotherapy. Specific therapies include those that espouse beliefs in "possession by spirit entities, past-life regression, alien abduction, Primal therapy and other unverified cathartic therapies, reparenting, rebirthing, neurolinguistic programming (NLP), facilitated communication (FC), Eye Movement Desensitization and Reprocessing (EMDR), Neural Organization Technique (NOT) and a host of other unscientific notions".

According to Singer and Lalich (1997:167), "crazy therapies" are promoted using several techniques. "One is to start a certification program soon after conjuring up a new procedure" and "another is to seduce customers with rash promises and endorsements from acolytes and sycophants." Singer and Lalich (1997:195) advise that if a therapist is saying "I don't understand it but it sure does work", that could be a red flag. "Or if he's answering your questions with a lot of jargon you don't understand, insist on straightforward explanations. Or if he's telling you that it's tried and true, do some independent research and find out what the critics are saying". "In many cases such fad therapies are promoted by people who are (1) imposing an agenda that may not fit your needs and (2) abandoning testing and science. Well meaning as they may be, remember, its your emotions and your pocketbook that are being played with".

== Reception ==
The book was reviewed by Philip Zimbardo, who wrote in Behavioral Interventions that the book revealed situations in which therapists can become "persuasive agents of destructive influence".

Robert Todd Carroll stated that the book describes "surreal pseudoscience at its worst". He added that Singer and Lalich had helped to expose "some of the worst psychotherapy has to offer".

== See also ==
- List of topics characterized as pseudoscience
