= Charles Calvert (cricketer, born 1833) =

English cricketer (1833–1905)

Charles Calvert (21 March 1833 – 7 April 1905) was an English first-class cricketer active 1865–68 who played for Middlesex and Surrey. He was born in Kneller Hall, Middlesex and died in Ecclefechan. He played in 27 first-class matches and captained Surrey in 1868.
