= Margaret Singer =

American psychologist and researcher (1921–2003)

- Born: July 29, 1921; Denver, Colorado, US
- Died: November 23, 2003 (aged 82); Berkeley, California, US
- Education: University of Denver, BA, MS; University of Denver, PhD
- Known for: Cults in Our Midst, Crazy Therapies
- Spouse: Jerome R. Singer
- Children: 2
- Scientific career
- Fields: Clinical psychology
- Workplaces: University of Colorado; Walter Reed Army Medical Center
- Doctoral students: Jesse S. Miller

Margaret Thaler Singer (July 29, 1921 – November 23, 2003) was an American clinical psychologist and researcher with her colleague Lyman Wynne on family communication. She was a prominent figure in the study of undue influence in social and religious contexts, and a proponent of the brainwashing theory of cults.

Singer's main areas of research included schizophrenia, family therapy, brainwashing and coercive persuasion. In the 1960s, she began to study the nature of social and religious group influence and brainwashing, and sat as a board member of the American Family Foundation and as an advisory board member of the Cult Awareness Network. She was the co-author of the book Cults in Our Midst.

== Education ==
Singer was born in Denver, Colorado, to Margaret McDonough Thaler and Raymond Willard Thaler. Her mother was a secretary to a federal judge and her father was chief operating engineer at the US Mint. While attending the University of Denver, she played cello in the Denver Civic Symphony. She received her Bachelor of Arts in speech and a Master of Science in speech pathology and special education from the University of Denver. Singer received her Doctor of Philosophy (PhD) degree in clinical psychology from the University of Denver in 1943.

== Career ==
After obtaining her PhD in clinical psychology, Singer worked at the University of Colorado's School of Medicine's department of psychiatry for eight years. In 1953, she started working at Walter Reed Army Medical Center, where she specialized in studying the returned prisoners of war who had been brainwashed by their captors into denouncing the United States and supporting North Korea and China.

In the scientific community, Singer was best known and respected for her studies in schizophrenia and family therapy. She conducted research with the National Institute of Mental Health, the United States Air Force, and the Massachusetts Institute of Technology. Singer was a guest lecturer of psychology at University of California, Berkeley, from 1964 to 1991, and she served as a faculty member and lecturer at other University of California campuses as well as the Albert Einstein College of Medicine, the University of Rochester, and other institutions.

Singer's work on family communication won her a place as one of the pioneers in the developing field of family therapy. As noted in one obituary, her collaboration with Lyman Wynne was particularly important.

Singer began to study brainwashing in the 1950s at Walter Reed in Washington, DC, where she interviewed United States soldiers who had been taken prisoner during the Korean War. Beginning in the late 1960s, she expanded her studies in the field of cults and published a number of articles on mind control ("psychological coercion") and similar areas. She developed theories about how cults recruit and retain members (such as her Theory of Systematic Manipulation of Social and Psychological Influence) and was on the board of many of the major anti-cult groups and organizations in the United States. At one point, Singer interviewed Charles Manson.

By the 1970s, Singer was a leading researcher in the field of psychosomatic medicine, and became the first female and first psychologist President of the American Psychosomatic Society in 1974. She also served as a member of the Kaiser Foundation Research Institute review board and the American Family Foundation board.

Singer testified as a brainwashing expert at the trial of Patty Hearst, presenting her conclusions that Hearst had been brainwashed, but outside the jury's presence. Singer described Hearst as "a low-IQ, low-affect zombie" and testified that by using speech patterns, she determined that Hearst was reading statements prepared by her captors. Prosecutors argued that Singer's testimony should not be presented to the jury because brainwashing had never before been accepted as a field of expertise upon which expert testimony could be presented. The judge decided in favor of the prosecution, and Hearst was convicted. Singer's testimony was widely reported, which increased her reputation as a brainwashing expert.

Singer played a role in the "Hillside Strangler" trial of Kenneth Bianchi. Singer concluded that Bianchi had faked symptoms of multiple personality disorder, in order to escape responsibility for the murders of several women in Los Angeles. Later, she spoke about the trial on PBS Frontline in a special show entitled: "The Mind of a Murderer." Singer asserted that Bianchi was a psychopath, and stated: "He may simply be evil."

Her expert testimony was no longer accepted after the report of the APA Task Force on Deceptive and Indirect Methods of Persuasion and Control, of which she was chair, was rejected by the Board of Social and Ethical Responsibility for Psychology (BSERP) of the American Psychological Association. Melton has written that afterward, courts began to shift toward accepting the position held by the great majority of scholars studying new religious movements, moving away from the minority perspective of Singer and others sympathetic to her brainwashing claims. According to Melton, this had significant consequences later on, since it meant that brainwashing could no longer be used as a defense for the practice of deprogramming.

== DIMPAC task force controversy and aftermath ==
In the early 1980s, some American mental health professionals became well-known figures due to their involvement as expert witnesses in court cases against groups they considered to be cults. In their testimonies they presented theories of brainwashing, mind control, or coercive persuasion to support the legal positions of former group members against their former groups.

The American Psychological Association (APA) in 1983 asked Singer, who was one of the leading proponents of coercive persuasion theories, to chair a taskforce to investigate whether brainwashing or "coercive persuasion" did indeed play a role in recruitment by such groups. The task force was called the APA Task Force on Deceptive and Indirect Methods of Persuasion and Control (DIMPAC). The task force completed its final report in November 1986. In May 1987 the APA Board of Social and Ethical Responsibility for Psychology (BSERP) rejected the DIMPAC final report, stating that the report "lack[ed] the scientific rigor and evenhanded critical approach necessary for APA imprimatur," and also stating that the BSERP did "not believe that we have sufficient information available to guide us in taking a position on this issue."

Singer and her associate, sociologist Richard Ofshe, subsequently sued the APA, and a group of scholars and lawyers, in 1992 for "defamation, frauds, aiding and abetting and conspiracy," and lost in 1994. In a further ruling, James R. Lambden ordered Ofshe and Singer to pay 80,000 USD in attorneys' fees under California's SLAPP-suit law. At that time, Singer and Ofshe declared their intention to sue Michael Flomenhaft, the lawyer that represented them in the case, for malpractice.

Singer was subsequently not accepted by judges as an expert witness in four cases alleging brainwashing and mind control. After the report was rejected, Singer reworked much of the rejected material into the book Cults in Our Midst: The Hidden Menace in Our Everyday Lives, which she co-authored with Janja Lalich.

== Landmark Education legal dispute (1996) ==
In 1996, Landmark Education sued Singer for defamation. Singer mentioned Landmark Education in Cults in our Midst; it was unclear whether she labeled Landmark Education as a cult or not. Singer issued a statement stating that she did not intend to call Landmark a cult, nor did she consider it a cult.

Amanda Scioscia reported in the Phoenix New Times that Singer never called Landmark a cult, but that she described it as a "controversial new age training course". She also stated that she would not recommend the group to anyone, and would not comment on whether Landmark used coercive persuasion for fear of legal recrimination from Landmark.

== Harassment and death threats ==
Singer faced harassment, including death threats and dead animals placed on her doorstep, from groups that disagreed with her views on cults. According to Richard Behar's article in Time magazine, Singer was an outspoken critic of Scientology and was known to travel under an assumed name to avoid harassment.

Her criticism of cults and their brainwashing tactics resulted in harassment of Singer's family and students as well, including breaking into Singer's office, stealing students' term papers and sending notes to Singer's students. According to the Los Angeles Times, other examples included cult operatives going through Singer's trash and mail, picketing her lectures, hacking into her computer, and releasing live rats in her house.

== Honors and awards ==
- Hofheimer Prize, American College of Psychiatrists, 1966
- Stanley R. Dean Award, American College of Psychiatrists, Research in Schizophrenia, 1976
- Achievement Awards, Mental Health Association of the United States

== Personal life ==
Singer was married to Jerome R. Singer, a physicist and professor at University of California, Berkeley. The couple had two children.

=== Death ===
Margaret Singer died of pneumonia on November 23, 2003, in Berkeley, California, at the Alta Bates Medical Center at the age of 82. Singer was survived by her husband, two children, and five grandchildren.

== Books ==
- Singer, Margaret Thaler; Lalich, Janja (September 27, 1996). "Crazy" Therapies: What Are They? Do They Work?. San Francisco, Calif.: Jossey-Bass. ISBN 978-0-7879-0278-0.
- Singer, Margaret Thaler; Lalich, Janja (March 1, 1995). Cults in Our Midst. San Francisco, Calif.: Jossey-Bass. ISBN 978-0-7879-0051-9.
- Singer, Margaret Thaler; Nievod, Abraham (2003). Lilienfeld, Scott O.; Lynn, Steven Jay; Lohr, Jeffrey M. (eds.). Science and Pseudoscience in Clinical Psychology (Pbk. ed.). New York: Guilford Press. pp. 176–204. ISBN 978-1-59385-070-8.
