= Nancy Wohlforth =

American union leader and activist

- Education: Columbia University
- Occupation: Trade unionist
- Organizations: AFL–CIO; Lesbian/Gay Labor Alliance (LGLA); Labor Campaign for Single Payer Healthcare; OPEIU; Pride at Work; US Labor Against the War (USLAW)
- Known for: Labor and LGBTQ activism; first out LGBTQ international union officer; first out LGBTQ member of the AFL–CIO Executive Council
- Movement: Labor Movement; LGBT Rights Movement
- Board member of: Vice-President OPEIU, Local 3, (Elected in 1983); Secretary-Treasurer and Business Manager, OPEIU, Local 3 (Elected in 1986); Co-President, Pride at Work, 1996–2009; Secretary-Treasurer Emerita, OPEIU, 2003–2009; Executive Council, AFL–CIO
- Awards: Pride at Work Solidarity Award, 2018

Nancy Wohlforth was an American union leader and activist who advocated for a variety of civil, labor, and LGBTQ causes throughout her career including single-payer healthcare, domestic partner worker benefits, and non-discrimination protections for LGBTQ workers. She was the first out member of the LGBTQ community to be elected to the AFL–CIO Executive Council in 2005.

== Career ==
=== Early career with OPEIU Local 3 ===
In 1980, Wohlforth helped found the Lesbian and Gay Labor Alliance (LGLA). She was also active with Office and Professional Employees International Union, Local 3 in San Francisco, California. Wohforth was a member of "A Growing Concern," a caucus within Local 3 seeking to reform the organization and draw attention to women's and gay issues after a 19-week-long strike at Blue Shield failed. In 1983, she was elected to be Local 3's vice-president as a part of "A Growing Concern's" first slate of candidates. Wohlforth later took on Business Manager responsibilities for the union and was elected to be their Secretary-Treasurer in 1986. As an out lesbian, Wohlforth faced rumors that she was in relationships with straight colleagues; however, her reputation as an out lesbian gave her credibility with LGBTQ workers and helped her win over local shops including the Episcopal Community Service, the St. Vincent de Paul Society, the Information Store, and Hospitality House.

=== Creation of Pride at Work ===
On June 24, 1994, LGBT labor leaders met in New York for "Pride at Work, the Founding Conference of the Lesbian, Gay, Bi-Sexual and Transgender People in the Labor Movement" meeting. The meeting was partially in honor of the 25th anniversary of the Stonewall riots. Wohlforth, representing LGLA and OPEIU, co-chaired a group working to create an organization uniting the different LGBT, labor organizations into a single organization, Pride at Work. Nancy was elected to the position of co-president with Cal Noyce in 1996, and Pride at Work adopted a resolution in support of affiliation with the AFL–CIO as an official constituency group at the same conference in San Francisco. They went on to secure constituency status in 1997.

=== National leadership ===
In 2003, Wohlforth was elected as the Secretary-Treasurer of the Office and Professional Employees International Union (OPEIU) making her the first open member of the LGBTQ community to hold an international union officer position. A couple years later, she was elected to the AFL–CIO Executive Council in 2005, making her the first open LGBTQ person elected to the Executive Council.

=== Death ===
Wohlforth died on December 31, 2024.

== See also ==
- Tim Wohlforth

== Awards ==
- In 1999, the Advocate listed her among their Best and Brightest Activists.
- Pride at Work Solidarity Award, 2018.

== Writing ==
- Holcomb, Desma; Wohlforth, Nancy (2001). "The Fruits of Our Labor: Pride at Work". New Labor Forum (8): 9–20. JSTOR 40342287.
- Wohlforth, Nancy; Santora, T. (June 6, 2007). "LGBT Solidarity". The New York Blade. 11 (25): 43.
- Wohlforth, Nancy (October 10, 1999). Stop the Hate (Speech). AFL-CIO Convention. Los Angeles, CA – via Recovering Democracy Archives.
- Wohlforth, Nancy (June 11, 2009). "Why LGBTs Should Care About Unions". Philadelphia Gay News. 33 (24): 11–20.
