= Hunter House Publishers =

- Parent company: Turner Publishing Company
- Founded: 1978
- Country of origin: United States
- Headquarters location: Alameda, California
- Publication types: Books
- Nonfiction topics: Health
- Official website: www.hunterhouse.com

Hunter House Publishers was a publishing company based in Alameda, California which was established in 1978.

It is a small publishing press "specializing in self-help books about health, relationships, abuse and sexuality."

Two of its award-winning books are Look Great, Live Green: Choosing Beauty Solutions That Are Planet-Safe and Budget-Smart, a Benjamin Franklin Book Award winner, and The Highly Intuitive Child: A Guide to Understanding and Parenting Unusually Sensitive and Empathic Children, a finalist, in the 2010 Benjamin Franklin Book, from the Independent Book Publishers Association.

Turner Publishing Company acquired Hunter House in 2014.
