= Tim Wohlforth =

American socialist activist and writer

- Born: Timothy Andrew Wohlforth; May 15, 1933
- Died: August 23, 2019 (aged 86)
- Occupations: Trotskyist leader, author

Timothy Andrew Wohlforth (May 15, 1933 – August 23, 2019), was a United States Trotskyist leader. On leaving the Trotskyist movement he became a writer of crime fiction and of politically oriented non-fiction.

As a student, Wohlforth joined the youth section of Max Shachtman's Independent Socialist League (ISL), the Socialist Youth League in 1953. He broke with Shachtman in 1957 when the ISL moved rightward to merge with the Socialist Party of America. Later that year, Wohlforth and a minority of ISL members joined the Socialist Workers Party (SWP), which was the main Trotskyist group in the US at the time.

In the early 1960s when the SWP and its supporters internationally in the International Committee of the Fourth International fused with the International Secretariat of the Fourth International and developed a critical but generally supportive attitude towards the Cuban Revolution, a minority of members led by Wohlforth and James Robertson (another former ISL member) formed the Revolutionary Tendency within the SWP. While Robertson left the SWP in 1962 and went on to form the Spartacist Group, later Spartacist League, Wohlforth and his supporters remained within the SWP and fought for the perspective of the International Committee of the Fourth International (ICFI). They were expelled in 1964 after demanding a discussion of the significance of the Sri Lankan Lanka Sama Samaja Party's entry into the government of Mrs. Sirimavo Bandaranaike. The US supporters of the ICFI formed the American Committee of the Fourth International, and in 1966 they formed the Workers League.

In 1974, the ICFI discovered that Wohforth's partner, Nancy Fields, an active member of the Workers League, was raised by a relative who had worked for the Central Intelligence Agency's computer division and had ties to top-ranking agency officials. The Workers League Political Committee and ICFI criticized the fact that neither Fields nor Wohlforth had revealed this to the League. In August 1974, the League's central committee suspended Fields from membership and removed Wohlforth as national secretary pending a commission of inquiry, in a unanimous vote that included Wohlforth's. Both left the League, and Wohlforth rejoined the SWP. An investigation conducted by the Workers League concluded that Fields did not have connections to the CIA, and the League requested that Wohlforth and Fields resume their membership. However, they refused.

Wohlforth later claimed that the Workers League became a cult, largely due to the domination and manipulations of the principal ICFI leader at the time, Gerry Healy.

Wohlforth was a member of the Democratic Socialists of America. In 1994 he published his memoirs, The Prophet's Children. He subsequently co-authored On The Edge: Political Cults Right and Left (2000) with Dennis Tourish. His former wife Nancy Wohlforth, is Secretary-Treasurer of the Office and Professional Employees International Union (OPEIU) and on the Executive Committee of the AFL-CIO.

== See also ==
- Tim Wohlforth, The Prophet's Children : Travels on the American Left, Humanities Press, 1994, ISBN 0-391-03802-8
- On the Edge: Political Cults Right and Left, M. E. Sharpe, 2000 (with Dennis Tourish), ISBN 0-7656-0639-9
