= Janja Lalich =

American sociologist (born 1945)

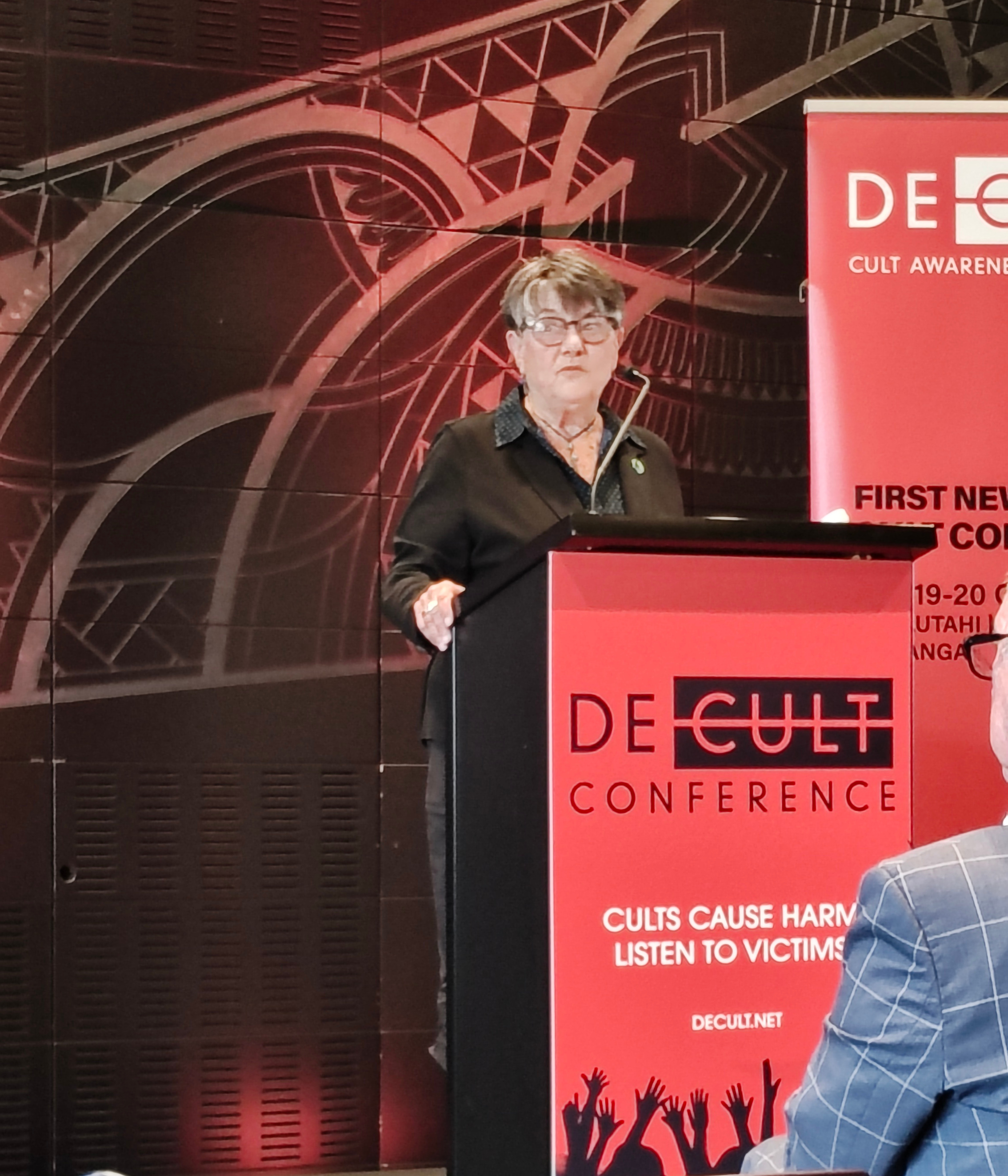
- Janja Lalich speaking at the 2024 Decult conference in New Zealand
- Born: 1945 (age 80–81)
- Occupation: Professor Emerita of Sociology
- Organization: California State University, Chico

Academic background
- Education: PhD
- Alma mater: Fielding Graduate University
- Website: janjalalich.com

Janja Lalich (/ˈjɑːnjə ˈlɑːlɪtʃ/ YAN-yə LAH-litch born 1945) is an American sociologist and writer. Lalich is an expert on cults and coercion, charismatic authority, power relations, ideology, and social control. She is a professor emerita of sociology at the California State University, Chico.

== Early life and education ==
The daughter of Serbian immigrants, Lalich was born in 1945. Lalich has a PhD in Human and Organizational Systems from Fielding Graduate University in Santa Barbara, California.

Beginning in the 1970s, Lalich spent around ten years as part of a radical Marxist-Leninist group, the Democratic Workers Party, which she later came to view as a cult. Lalich recalls that during her time in the group she stored questions and doubts in the back of her mind, unable to express them. Lalich became a high-ranking member of the group working long hours with little contact outside the immediate members. She claims that ex-members were harassed and attacked and that she felt increasingly threatened. Eventually, the group dissolved and she was able to leave.

== Career ==
Lalich is a professor in the sociology department of California State University, Chico, and has contributed several articles to academic journals on the subject of cults and religions. After her experiences in a radical political group that she identifies as a cult, she founded the Center for Research on Influence and Control. In her work, she describes the main features of a "totalistic" control group or cult: "They 'espouse an all-encompassing belief system', 'exhibit excessive devotion to the leader', 'avoid criticism of the group and its leader', and 'feel disdain for non-members'."

Lalich went on to write several books on the subject of cults, including her best known book, Bounded Choice (2004), based on Heaven's Gate. As a recognized international authority in the field, Lalich has also appeared in several court cases as an expert witness on coercive control or undue influence.

In 2007, Lalich was awarded the Margaret L. Singer Award: "for advancing the understanding of coercive persuasion, undue influence, and psychological manipulation" by the International Cultic Studies Association.

== Bibliography ==
- Captive Hearts, Captive Minds
- Cults in Our Midst
- Crazy Therapies
- Misunderstanding Cults, contributor
- Take Back Your Life
- Escaping Utopia: Growing Up in a Cult, Getting Out, and Starting Over
