= Twisted Scriptures =

1997 non-fiction book by Mary Alice Chrnalogar

- Book cover
- Author: Mary Alice Chrnalogar
- Language: English
- Subject: Mind control, cults, new religious movements
- Genre: Non-fiction
- Publisher: Zondervan
- Publication date: 1997
- Publication place: United States
- Pages: 304
- ISBN: 0-310-23408-5
- OCLC: 36990972
- Dewey Decimal: 262/.8 21
- LC Class: BV4520 .C58 2000

Twisted Scriptures: Breaking Free from Churches That Abuse (first edition Twisted Scriptures: A Path to Freedom from Abusive Churches) is a non-fiction book by Mary Alice Chrnalogar, published by Zondervan. Chrnalogar instructs readers on how to determine if a religious group is manipulative or abusive, and describes techniques of mind control. The book was first published in 1997 by publishers Whitaker House and Control Techniques, and republished in 2000 by Zondervan. A Spanish language edition was published in 2006 by Vida.

== Author ==
Chrnalogar is a former member of a cult. The Post-Tribune called her a "leading cult deprogrammer", What Magazine referred to her as "an exit counselor and an internationally recognized deprogrammer", and she was described on CTV Television Network as "an expert in Christian cults". The Yearbook of Experts described Chrnalogar as "an internationally renowned cult deprogrammer". She began her work as a cult deprogrammer in 1980. She operates a business, Freedom From Manipulation, and works with individuals in the United States to assist them to leave cults or manipulative religious groups. In 2006 she resided in Tennessee.

Chrnalogar was a member of Church Universal and Triumphant, a group she describes as "an abusive New Age church". She first encountered the organization's leader, Elizabeth Clare Prophet or "Guru Ma", in 1979. She experienced a personality change, and was deprogrammed by Ted Patrick. Chrnalogar said that "I was so fascinated that someone could change my mind in 24 hours that I asked him if I could go on some jobs with him," and after that she became a deprogrammer.

== Contents ==
Twisted Scriptures has an intended audience of people stuck in manipulative religious organizations. Chrnalogar writes that some churches manipulate text of the Bible to coerce followers. She describes how individuals can be subjected to mind control in order to become obedient to a religious movement. Readers are instructed to be able to determine how to notice if a church is manipulating the Scriptures or using abusive tactics. "Discipleship control is worse than having a domineering mother who tells you whom to marry!. You usually will be viewed as 'going against God' if you act in opposition to the advice of your discipler, but seen only as a headstrong child if you go against the wishes of your mother," writes Chrnalogar in the book. Chrnalogar points out that mind control can be practiced without severe tactics, writing: "All that's needed is an environment where the information can be controlled, and more importantly, the way people perceive that information." She cites mind control characteristics identified by Robert Jay Lifton, and asserts that only six of his "psychological themes" are required in order to manipulate followers in a cult.

Michelle K. Witowski of the Post-Tribune characterized Twisted Scriptures as "a book designed to free cult victims". Leslie Malkin reviewed the book for What Magazine, and commented: "Through the questioning of authority, putting biblical scriptures back into context and restoration of critical thinking, Chrnalogar also shows readers how to find the path to freedom."
