= Michael Langone =

American counseling psychologist (born 1947)

Michael D. Langone
- Born: 1947 (age 78–79)
- Known for: Recovery from Cults
- Scientific career
- Fields: psychology, cults, new religious movements
- Workplaces: International Cultic Studies Association

Michael D. Langone (born 1947) is an American counseling psychologist who specializes in research about cultic groups and psychological manipulation. He is executive director of the International Cultic Studies Association, and founding editor of the journal Cultic Studies Journal, later the Cultic Studies Review.

Langone is author and co-author of two books and several articles. He first joined the International Cultic Studies Association (then the American Family Foundation) in 1981.

== Career ==
Langone received his Ph.D. in Counseling Psychology from University of California, Santa Barbara in 1979, where he was a Regents Fellow for three years, and he began his work in cults in 1978. Langone defines a cult as "a group or movement exhibiting a great or excessive devotion or dedication to some person, idea, or thing, and employing unethically manipulative techniques of persuasion and control designed to advance the goals of the group’s leader, to the actual or possible detriment of members, their families, or the community". Langone joined the American Family Foundation in 1981, the organization later changed its name to the International Cultic Studies Association.

In 1984 he became the editor of the American Family Foundation's house publication, Cultic Studies Journal. The journal ceased publication in 2001 and was replaced with Cultic Studies Review as an online journal with triennial print editions.

== Theories ==
In his book Recovering from Cults, Langone writes that cults "need not be religious in nature but may be psycho-therapeutic, political, or commercial". In his writings, Langone argues that new religions conflict with traditional American beliefs and have to be considered objectionable for that reason, stating that he makes no apologies "for evaluating cults in terms of fundamental American values, which I have imbibed, examined and accepted."

The former American Family Foundation, headed by Langone, is described as offering the most public support for the mind-control theory through its Cultic Studies Journal. The theory is seen by researchers as a propaganda device used by the anti-cult movement to rationalize the persecution of minority religious groups. Mark Pendergrast criticized him for his belief in Satanic ritual abuse.

== Publications and presentations ==
- Ross, Joan Carol; Langone, Michael D. (September 1989). Cults : what parents should know : a practical guide to help parents with children in destructive groups. New York: Carol Pub. Group. ISBN 978-0818405112.
- Satanism and Occult-Related Violence (1990) with Linda Blood
- Langone, Michael D. (April 1990). "Working with cult-affected families". Psychiatric Annals. 20 (4): 194–198. doi:10.3928/0048-5713-19900401-07.
- Langone, Michael D., ed. (1994). Recovery from Cults : Help for victims of psychological and spiritual abuse. New York: W.W. Norton. ISBN 978-0393701647.
- Langone, Michael D. (July 1, 1996). "Clinical Update on Cults". psychiatrictimes.com.

== See also ==
- Anti-cult movement
- List of cult and new religious movement researchers
- Recovering from Cults: Help for Victims of Psychological and Spiritual Abuse
