= Democratic Workers Party =

- Founded: 1974
- Dissolved: August 1987
- Ideology: Communism; Marxism–Leninism
- Political position: Far-left

The Democratic Workers Party was a United States Marxist–Leninist party headed by former professor Marlene Dixon. Based in California, the party was active from 1974 to 1987. One member, Janja Lalich, later became a widely cited researcher on cults. Lalich characterized the DWP as a political cult with Dixon serving as its charismatic leader. She estimated that the Democratic Workers Party at one point had 125-150 full-time members and 300-1,000 members with various degrees of affiliation.

== Marlene Dixon ==
Marlene Dixon had earned a Ph.D. at the University of California, Los Angeles, in the mid-1960s. She taught sociology at the University of Chicago and then McGill University in Montreal, Quebec, Canada. She was an admirer of the works of Robert Jay Lifton, Immanuel Wallerstein and Andre Gunder Frank, but as the party began to unravel in 1984 she criticized the latter two as anti-communists.

In November 1968, while a professor at the University of Chicago, Dixon participated in a political demonstration, and two months later when her contract renewal came up, the university's sociology department voted unanimously not to rehire her. The student movement on campus saw this as a politically motivated decision, and a "Committee of 75" was formed which published an open letter demanding Dixon be rehired, as well as students being given an equal say in the hiring and firing of professors. Tensions escalated, and on January 30, a group of 400 students occupied the university's administration building in what would be a thirteen-day sit-in. The university administration responded with the expulsion of 42 students. While nominally in support of Dixon, students used the sit-in as an opportunity to air many grievances against the university: its lack of opposition to the Vietnam War, its weak support for the women's movement and the hiring of female professors, and its spearheading of "urban renewal" and early gentrification efforts in Chicago. As a result of the protests, Dixon gained a large following. A statement on the University of Chicago sit-in for Marlene Dixon was included in the 1970 anthology Sisterhood is Powerful: An Anthology of Writings From The Women's Liberation Movement, edited by Robin Morgan.

While serving at McGill University she once again built up a following among students, and began organizing meetings with them. Relations between her and the staff of McGill University had begun falling in the early 1970s, and by 1974 she had decided to stop teaching. By the time of the formation of the DWP she was politically a Marxist feminist with Maoist sympathies, also a proponent of gay liberation and anti-racism.

== Foundation ==
In the summer of 1974, Dixon (now in the San Francisco Bay Area, California) pushed for the creation of a radical group which would evolve into a party with Leninist guidelines. This resulted in an initial group of thirteen women led by Dixon, who formed the original core of the party. In that same period a Central Committee was elected via secret ballot and Dixon wrote an 18-page work known as the Principles of Dialectical Leadership, which constituted the nascent party's first internal document. The party's constitution was then written soon after along with a position paper known as On the World Situation. The party encouraged recruitment efforts by both men and women, regardless of sexual orientation. Recruits took on new names within the organization, pooled together their income and resources, worked at assigned tasks for ten hours or more, and other activities meant to reinforce a collective culture. Self-criticism was also widely practiced to abusive extremes along with other measures to an extent condemned by critics and ex-members as destroying any chances of internal debate. The position of General Secretary was formed by 1976 with Dixon as the first and only holder of the title. The name of the party was originally the Workers Party for Proletarian Socialism, then changed to the Workers Party until eventually becoming the Democratic Workers Party by 1984.

The DWP had a core membership of 100-125 people. Max Elbaum categorizes it as part of the New Communist movement.

== Influence ==
Throughout the 1970s, study groups were formed and recruits grew steadily. Though the party itself operated in a paramilitary and clandestine manner, members participated in activities among Leftist groups and supporting strikes while keeping their membership and party secret. From 1978–1981 the party operated via front groups such as the Grass Roots Alliance which rallied against Proposition 13 and sought to raise public awareness on various social issues through reformism. On November 6, 1979, the Party's existence was formally acknowledged through a public document issued by the Party itself. The party grew from 125 to 175 full-time militants. At this point a definite personality cult began to develop around Dixon as she was promoted as a great theoretical figure within the Communist movement. "Comrade Marlene and the Party are inseparable; [and] her contribution is the Party itself, is the unity all of us join together to build upon. The Party is now the material expression of that unity, of that theoretical world view. That world view is the world view of the Party, its central leadership and all of its members. And there will be no other world view ... This was the unity that founded the Party, this was the unity that safeguarded the Party through purge and two-line struggle, and this is the unity we will protect and defend at all costs. There will be no other unity."

The party developed its own print shop (first called Greenleaf Press, then Synthex Press), which grew into a full-service printing and publishing operation that serviced mainstream clients such as banks, catalog companies, and publishers throughout the San Francisco Bay Area. The press produced numerous materials for the Party: books, journals, newspapers, pamphlets, fliers, bulletins, direct mail solicitations and buttons among other things. The Party developed its own newspaper; the Rebel Worker (later known as Plain Speaking) along with theoretical journals such as Our Socialism. The DWP produced two academic journals, Contemporary Marxism and the independently edited Crime and Social Justice, which solicited and published articles by well-known Leftist intellectuals. The publishing house exhibited at major book trade shows, such as the American Library Association, the American Booksellers Association, and the Frankfurt International Book Fair, and engaged in fairly large direct-mail campaigns, sending out catalogs and fliers to solicit orders and garner publicity.

Several front organizations (such as the Worker-Patient Organization, the Peace and Justice Organization and U.S. Out of Central America) were organized by the DWP. These groups sponsored various political activities and campaigns "including the quite popular Tax the Corporations initiatives, Propositions P, V, and M, the latter of which succeeded in 1980 but was never implemented. Proposition P, on the November 1979 San Francisco ballot, received 48 percent of the vote. Proposition V, in June 1980, brought in 41 percent, even after much negative publicity about the DWP in the local press. And Proposition M, in November 1980, passed with 55 percent of the vote but was later declared illegal." The DWP began working with the Peace and Freedom Party, supporting the candidate for governor on the latter party's ticket in 1982. Front groups were also created in workplaces and academic institutions. The U.S. Out of Central America front organized and conducted delegations to Sandinista-led Nicaragua, and lobbied Congress on various issues related to U.S. intervention policies.

The party developed a reputation among some of the Left as a sectarian party practicing entryism and the physical intimidation of rival Communist parties.

== Downfall ==
As the 1970s drew to a close, Dixon felt that the party was becoming too reformist and had lost its revolutionary ambitions. Once a strong critic of the petite bourgeoisie class and purging many members of the party over their alleged "petite-bourgeois" activities and ways of thinking, she had begun to see the United States working class as increasingly unable to bring about crucial change and instead began supporting progressive elements of the petite bourgeoisie. This alienated many who had struggled against alleged "PB" (petite-bourgeois) influence within the party and saw this as an about-face. The party also began focusing on foreign affairs while moving away from Maoism (though in the process gravitating towards Maoist-inspired third-worldism and adherence to labor aristocracy) in favor of the Soviet Union and its Warsaw Pact states, Bulgaria in particular, while stressing the importance of the Soviet Union and the belief that the development of the world socialist movement was impossible without the existence of the USSR. Dixon began traveling to Western Europe, Yugoslavia and Bulgaria with the eventual goal of receiving an invitation from the Soviet Union.

At the same time, Dixon distanced herself from Marxism-Leninism and declared that it had been a failure in the United States. She soon went further, suggesting an end to the party's adherence to Marxism (while keeping Marx's influence) and getting rid of the party's Communist image (while retaining democratic centralism). A proposed name for a newly structured party was the Alliance Against American Militarism. By this time the party had about 110 members and its front groups had become either defunct or moribund.

In the fall of 1985 Dixon began supporting the idea of leaving the party and setting up a think tank in Washington, D.C. Many in the party at this point became increasingly irate at Dixon's behavior, citing her alcoholism and paranoia making her increasingly erratic and too unstable to speak to. She encouraged her lieutenants to launch a "Quality of Life" campaign within the party so that party members could assess their own lives. Lieutenants took this at face value and in late October members of the party began talking to each other on various party issues and their own lives regardless of party rules and regulations, this being made possible by Dixon's absence from the country while on a trip to Eastern Europe. The party's lieutenants called together various members and began speaking out against aspects of the party while discussing its "real nature." Party sessions continued for some few weeks more, until the night before Dixon was scheduled to return. On that night party members convened and unanimously voted to expel the General Secretary (Dixon) from the party, and then to dissolve it. A vote by mail was held in April 1986 amid heated discussions on the future of the party and a majority voted to confirm the party's dissolution and to liquidate its assets, to be shared among former cadres (which was achieved in August 1987).

One of the party's former members, Janja Lalich, went on to become a professor of sociology and a leading expert on cults.
