= Cult =

High-control social group

A cult is a social group that has unusual, and often extreme, religious, spiritual or philosophical beliefs and rituals. Extreme devotion to a particular person, object, or goal is another characteristic often ascribed to cults. The term has different, divergent and often pejorative definitions both in popular culture and academia and has been an ongoing source of contention among scholars across several fields of study.

Beginning in the 1930s, new religious movements became an object of sociological study within the context of the study of religious behavior. Since the 1940s, the Christian countercult movement has opposed some sects and new religious movements, labeling them cults because of their unorthodox beliefs. Since the 1970s, the secular anti-cult movement has opposed certain groups, which they call cults, accusing them of practicing brainwashing.

Groups labelled cults are found around the world and range in size from small localized groups to some international organizations with up to millions of members.

== Definition and usage ==
The word cult is derived from the Latin term cultus, which means 'worship'. In modern English, the term cult is generally a pejorative carrying derogatory connotations. The term is variously applied to abusive or coercive groups of many categories, including gangs, organized crime, and terrorist organizations.

An older sense of the word cult, which is not pejorative, indicates a set of religious devotional practices that is conventional within its culture, is related to a particular figure, and is frequently associated with a particular place, or generally the collective participation in rites of religion. References to the imperial cult of ancient Rome, for example, use the word in this sense. A derived sense of "excessive devotion" arose in the 19th century, and usage is not always strictly religious. (Note: Compare the Oxford English Dictionary note for usage in 1875: "cult:...b. A relatively small group of people having (esp. religious) beliefs or practices regarded by others as strange or sinister, or as exercising excessive control over members.… 1875 Brit. Mail 30 Jan. 13/1 Buffaloism is, it would seem, a cult, a creed, a secret community, the members of which are bound together by strange and weird vows, and listen in hidden conclave to mysterious lore." "cult". Oxford English Dictionary (online ed.). Oxford University Press. (Subscription or participating institution membership required.))

Sociological classifications of religious movements may identify a cult as a social group with socially deviant or novel beliefs and practices, although this is often unclear. Other researchers present a less-organized picture of cults, saying that they arise spontaneously around novel beliefs and practices. Cults have been compared to miniature totalitarian political systems. Such groups are typically described as being led by a charismatic leader who tightly controls its members.

In its pejorative sense, the term is often used for new religious movements and other social groups defined by their unusual religious, spiritual, or philosophical beliefs and rituals, or their group belief in a particular person, object, or goal. This sense of the term is weakly defined, having divergent definitions both in popular culture and in academia, where it has been an ongoing source of contention among scholars across several fields of study. According to Susannah Crockford, "[t]he word 'cult' is a shapeshifter, semantically morphing with the intentions of whoever uses it. As an analytical term, it resists rigorous definition." She argues that the least subjective definition of cult refers to a religion or religion-like group "self-consciously building a new form of society", but that the rest of society rejects as unacceptable.

The term cult has been criticized as lacking "scholarly rigour"; Benjamin E. Zeller stated "[l]abelling any group with which one disagrees and considers deviant as a cult may be a common occurrence, but it is not scholarship". Religious scholar Catherine Wessinger argued the term was dehumanizing of the people within the group, as well as their children; following the Waco siege, it was argued by some scholars that the defining of the Branch Davidians as a cult by the media, government and former members is a significant factor as to what led to the deaths. However, it has also been viewed as empowering for ex-members of groups who have had traumatic experiences. The term was noted to carry "considerable cultural legitimacy".

In the 1970s, with the rise of secular anti-cult movements, scholars (though not the general public) began to abandon the use of the term cult, regarding it as pejorative. By the end of the 1970s, the term cult was largely replaced in academia with the term "new religion" or "new religious movement". Other proposed alternative terms that have been used were "emergent religion", "alternative religious movement", or "marginal religious movement", though new religious movement is the most popular term. The anti-cult movement mostly regards the term "new religious movement" as a euphemism for "cult" that loses the implication that they are harmful.

== Scholarly studies ==
Howard P. Becker's church–sect typology, based on Ernst Troeltsch's original theory and providing the basis for a modern classification of cults, sects, and new religious movements

Beginning in the 1930s, new religious movements perceived as cults became an object of sociological study within the context of the study of religious behavior. The term "cult" in this context saw its origins in the work of sociologist Max Weber (1864–1920). Weber was an important theorist in the academic study of cults, which often draws on his theorizations of charismatic authority, and of the distinction he drew between churches and sects. This concept of a church–sect division was further elaborated upon by German theologian Ernst Troeltsch, who added a "mystical" categorization to accommodate more personal or individual religious experiences.

American sociologist Howard P. Becker further bisected Troeltsch's first two categories, splitting church into ecclesia and denomination; and sect into sect and cult. Like Troeltsch's "mystical religion", Becker's cult refers to small religious groups that lack organization and that emphasize the private nature of personal beliefs.

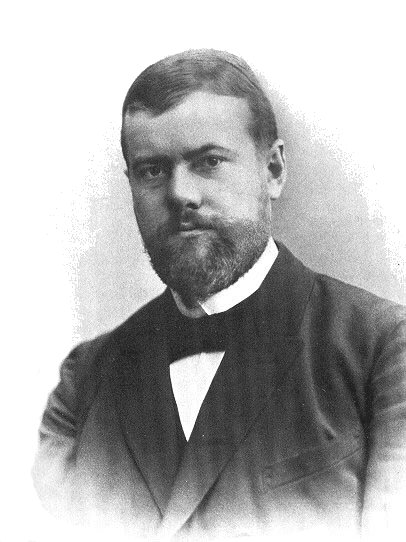
Max Weber (1864–1920), an important theorist in the study of cults

Later sociological formulations built on such characteristics, placing an additional emphasis on cults as deviant religious groups, "deriving their inspiration from outside of the predominant religious culture." This is often thought to lead to a high degree of tension between the group and the more mainstream culture surrounding it, a characteristic shared with religious sects. According to this sociological terminology, sects are products of religious schism and therefore maintain a continuity with traditional beliefs and practices, whereas cults arise spontaneously around novel beliefs and practices.

Scholars William Sims Bainbridge and Rodney Stark have argued for a further distinction between three kinds of cults: cult movements, client cults, and audience cults, all of which share a "compensator" or rewards for the things invested into the group. In the Bainbridge–Stark typology, a "cult movement" is an actual complete organization, differing from a "sect" in that it is not a splinter of a bigger religion, while "audience cults" are loosely organized, and propagated through media, and "client cults" offer services (i.e. psychic readings or meditation sessions). One type can turn into another, for example the Church of Scientology changing from audience to client cult. Sociologists who follow the Bainbridge–Stark classification tend to continue using the word "cult", unlike most other academics; however Bainbridge later stated he regretted having used the word at all. Stark and Bainbridge, in discussing the process by which individuals join new religious groups, have even questioned the utility of the concept of conversion, suggesting affiliation as a more useful concept.

In the early 1960s, sociologist John Lofland studied the activities of Unification Church members in California in trying to promote their beliefs and win new members. Lofland noted that most of their efforts were ineffective and that most of the people who joined did so because of personal relationships with other members (often family relationships). Lofland published his findings in 1964 as a doctoral thesis entitled "The World Savers: A Field Study of Cult Processes", and in 1966 in book form by as Doomsday Cult: A Study of Conversion, Proselytization, and Maintenance of Faith. This work is considered to be one of the most important and widely cited studies of the process of religious conversion.

J. Gordon Melton stated that, in 1970, "one could count the number of active researchers on new religions on one's hands". However, James R. Lewis in 2004 wrote that the "meteoric growth" in this field of study can be attributed to the cult controversy of the early 1970s. Because of "a wave of nontraditional religiosity" in the late 1960s and early 1970s, academics perceived new religious movements as different phenomena from previous religious innovations.

Some Stanford University research published in 1994 has documented and discussed "cultism" and "cult-like" characteristics in "visionary companies".

Scholar Robert Jay Lifton outlined various methods of "thought reform" used by cults to influence and control their members. These include presenting the group's teachings as the ultimate truth of the universe, beyond criticism and question, and can include claims to possess "special scientific knowledge of human behavior and psychology". Lifton also described a tendency to deify words and oversimplify complex issues of life into simple slogans presented as representing the "truth as a totality". Members may be encouraged to regard the doctrine as the truth and to disregard or reject experiences that contradict it, while doubt about the doctrine may be interpreted as evidence of personal inadequacy or moral failing.

== Types ==
=== Destructive cults ===
Destructive cult is a term frequently used by the anti-cult movement. Members of the anti-cult movement typically define a destructive cult as a group that is unethical, deceptive, and one that uses "strong influence" or mind control techniques to affect critical thinking skills. This term is sometimes presented in contrast to a "benign cult", which implies that not all "cults" would be harmful, though others apply it to all cults. Psychologist Michael Langone, executive director of the anti-cult group International Cultic Studies Association, defines a destructive cult as "a highly manipulative group which exploits and sometimes physically and/or psychologically damages members and recruits."

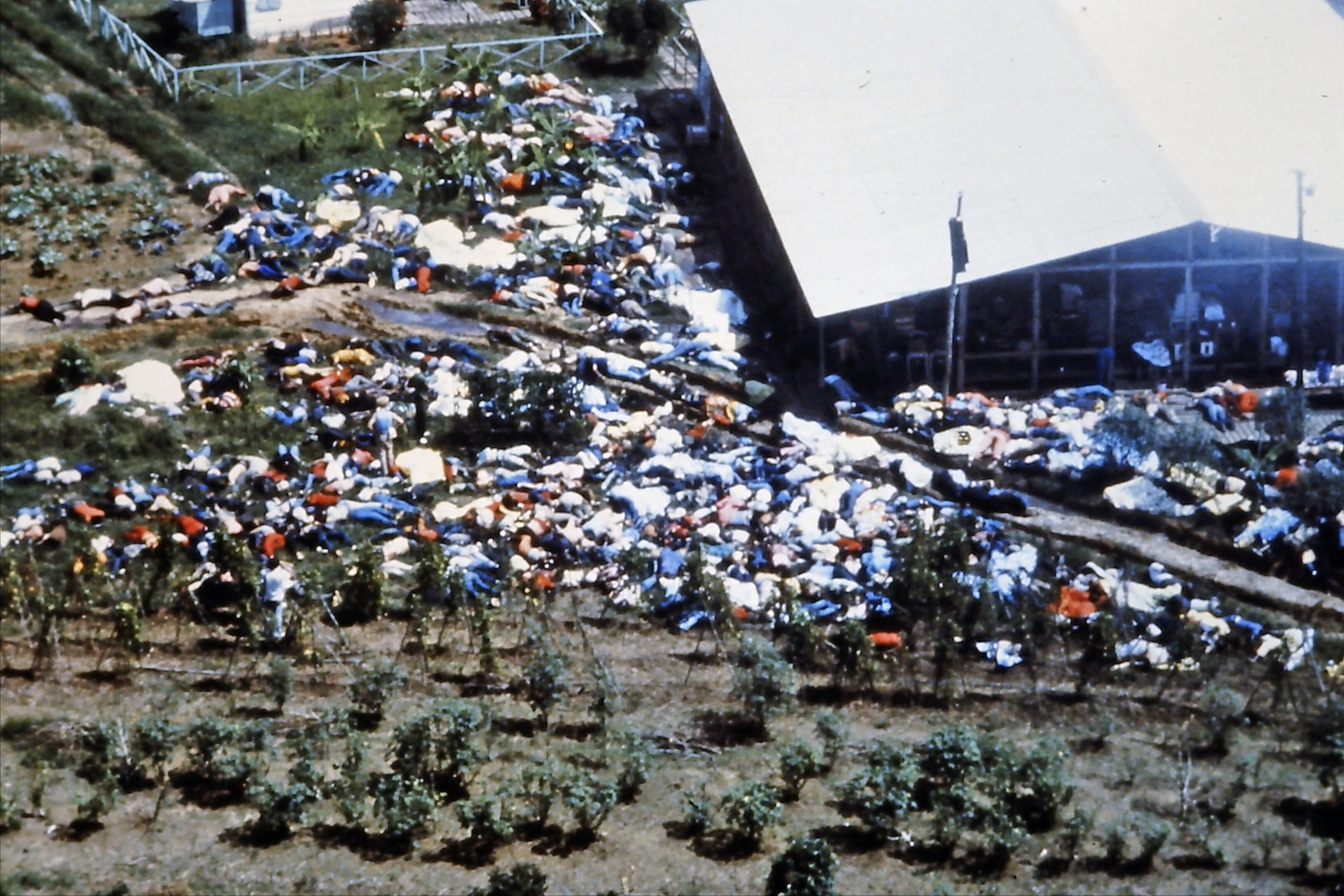
Hundreds of dead bodies on the ground after the Jonestown Massacre, orchestrated by cult leader Jim Jones

In Cults and the Family, the authors cite Eli Shapiro, who defines a destructive cultism as a sociopathic syndrome, whose distinctive qualities include: "behavioral and personality changes, loss of personal identity, cessation of scholastic activities, estrangement from family, disinterest in society and pronounced mental control and enslavement by cult leaders."

Writing about Bruderhof communities in the book Misunderstanding Cults, Julius H. Rubin said that American religious innovation created an unending diversity of sects. These "new religious movements…gathered new converts and issued challenges to the wider society. Not infrequently, public controversy, contested narratives and litigation result." In his work Cults in Context author Lorne L. Dawson writes that although the Unification Church "has not been shown to be violent or volatile," it has been described as a destructive cult by "anticult crusaders."

In 2002, the German government was held by the Federal Constitutional Court to have defamed the Osho movement by referring to it, among other things, as a "destructive cult" with no factual basis.

Some researchers have criticized the term destructive cult, writing that it is used to describe groups which are not necessarily harmful in nature to themselves or others. In his book Understanding New Religious Movements, John A. Saliba writes that the term is overgeneralized. Saliba sees the Peoples Temple as the "paradigm of a destructive cult", where those that use the term are implying that other groups will also commit mass suicide.

=== Doomsday cults ===
Doomsday cult is a term which is used to describe groups that believe in apocalypticism and millenarianism, and it can also be used to refer both to groups that predict disaster, and groups that attempt to bring it about. In the 1950s, American social psychologist Leon Festinger and his colleagues observed members of a small UFO religion called The Seekers for several months, and recorded their conversations both prior to and after a failed prophecy from their charismatic leader. Their work was later published in the book When Prophecy Fails: A Social and Psychological Study of a Modern Group that Predicted the Destruction of the World.

In the late 1980s, doomsday cults were a major topic of news reports, with some reporters and commentators considering them a serious threat to society. A 1997 psychological study by Festinger, Riecken, and Schachter found that people turned to a cataclysmic world view after they had repeatedly failed to find meaning in mainstream movements.

=== Political cults ===
A political cult is a cult with a primary interest in political action and ideology. Groups that some have described as "political cults", mostly advocating far-left or far-right agendas, have received some attention from journalists and scholars. In their 2000 book On the Edge: Political Cults Right and Left, Dennis Tourish and Tim Wohlforth discuss a dozen organizations in the United States and Great Britain that they characterize as cults.

== Anti-cult movements ==
=== Christian countercult movement in the United States ===
In the 1940s, the long-held opposition by some established Christian denominations to non-Christian religions and heretical or counterfeit Christian sects crystallized into a more organized Christian countercult movement in the United States. For those belonging to the movement, all religious groups claiming to be Christian, but deemed outside of Christian orthodoxy, were considered cults. The countercult movement is mostly evangelical Protestants. The Christian countercult movement asserts that Christian groups whose teachings deviate from the belief that the bible is inerrant, but also focuses on non-Christian religions like Hinduism. Christian countercult activist writers also emphasize the need for Christians to evangelize to followers of cults.

=== Global secular anti-cult movement ===
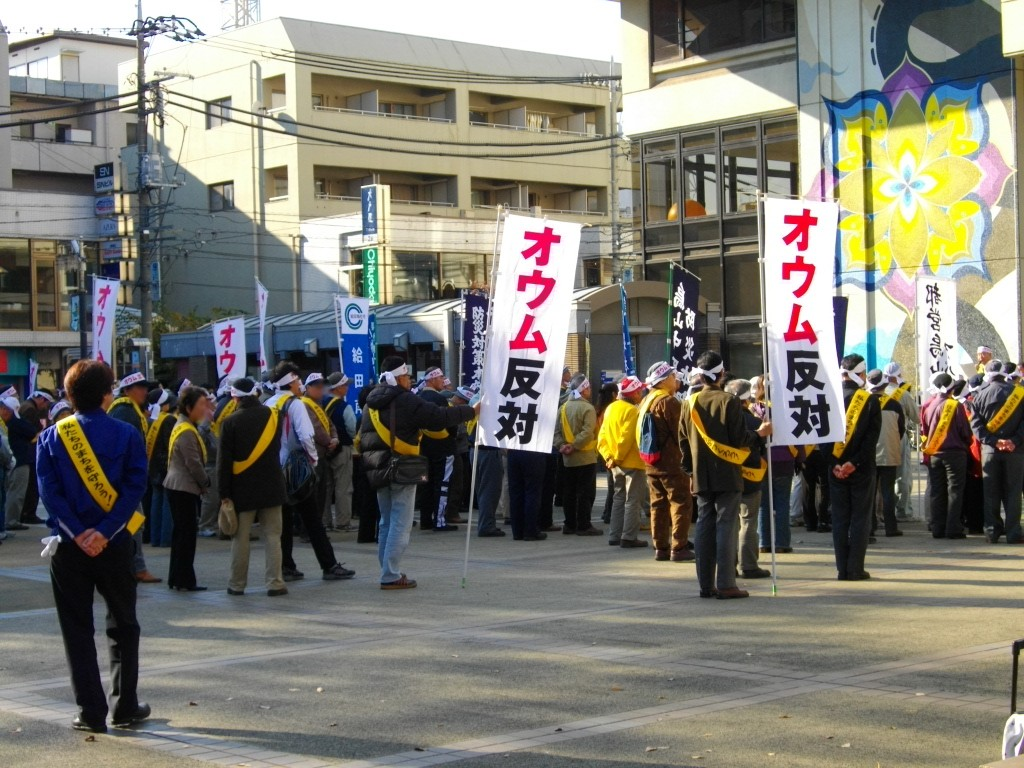
An anti-Aum Shinrikyo protest in Japan, 2009

Starting in the late 1960s, a different strand of anti-cult groups arose, with the formation of the secular anti-cult movement (ACM). This was in response to the rise of new religions in the 1960s and 1970s, particularly the events at Jonestown and the deaths of nearly 1000 people. The organizations that formed the secular anti-cult movement (ACM) often acted on behalf of relatives of "cult" converts who did not believe their loved ones could have altered their lives so drastically by their own free will. A few psychologists and sociologists working in this field suggested that brainwashing techniques were used to maintain the loyalty of cult members.

The belief that cults brainwashed their members became a unifying theme among cult critics and in the more extreme corners of the anti-cult movement techniques like the sometimes forceful "deprogramming" of cult members was practised. In the mass media, and among average citizens, "cult" gained an increasingly negative connotation, becoming associated with things like kidnapping, brainwashing, psychological abuse, sexual abuse, and other criminal activity, and mass suicide. While most of these negative qualities usually have real documented precedents in the activities of a very small minority of new religious groups, mass culture often extends them to any religious group viewed as culturally deviant, however peaceful or law abiding it may be.

While some psychologists were receptive to these theories, sociologists were for the most part sceptical of their ability to explain conversion to NRMs. In the late 1980s, psychologists and sociologists started to abandon theories like brainwashing and mind control. While scholars may believe that various less dramatic coercive psychological mechanisms could influence group members, they came to see conversion to new religious movements principally as an act of a rational choice. While some, including former "deprogramming experts," now advocate for interventions and exit counseling to pull people from cults, other survivors and experts including Daniella Mestyanek young are of the belief that little can be done to force people to leave high-control groups. These skeptics often advocate for people in cults, those close to them, and people who don't believe themselves to be in cults to personally work on deconstruction of the ideas they have been taught. Critical analysis about hierarchy, freedom, and groups can allow people to chose to leave a cult on their own and also helps them avoid abusive relationships or falling into another cult, also known as "cult-hopping".

== Governmental policies and actions ==
The application of the labels cult or sect to religious movements in government documents signifies the popular and negative use of the term cult in English and a functionally similar use of words translated as 'sect' in several European languages. Sociologists critical to this negative politicized use of the word cult argue that it may adversely impact the religious freedoms of group members. At the height of the counter-cult movement and ritual abuse scare of the 1990s, some governments published lists of cults. (Note: Or "sects" in German or French-speaking countries, the German term sekten and the French term sectes having assumed the same derogatory meaning as English "cult".) Groups labelled "cults" are found around the world and range in size from local groups with a few members to international organizations with millions.

While these documents utilize similar terminology, they do not necessarily include the same groups nor is their assessment of these groups based on agreed criteria. Other governments and world bodies also report on new religious movements but do not use these terms to describe the groups. Since the 2000s, some governments have again distanced themselves from such classifications of religious movements. (Note: Austria: Beginning in 2011, the Bureau of Democracy, Human Rights, and Labor's International Religious Freedom Report no longer distinguishes sects in Austria as a separate group. "International Religious Freedom Report for 2012". Bureau of Democracy, Human Rights, and Labor.; Belgium: The Justice Commission of the Belgian House of Representatives published a report on cults in 1997. A Brussels Appeals Court in 2005 condemned the House of Representatives on the grounds that it had damaged the image of an organization listed.; France: A parliamentary commission of the National Assembly compiled a list of purported cults in 1995. In 2005, the Prime Minister stated that the concerns addressed in the list "had become less pertinent" and that the government needed to balance its concern with cults with respect for public freedoms and laїcité.; Germany: The legitimacy of a 1997 Berlin Senate report listing cults (sekten) was defended in a court decision of 2003 (Oberverwaltungsgericht Berlin [OVG 5 B 26.00] 25 September 2003). The list is still maintained by Berlin city authorities: Sekten und Psychogruppen – Leitstelle Berlin.) While the official response to new religious groups has been mixed across the globe, some governments aligned more with the critics of these groups to the extent of distinguishing between "legitimate" religion and "dangerous", "unwanted" cults in public policy.

=== China ===
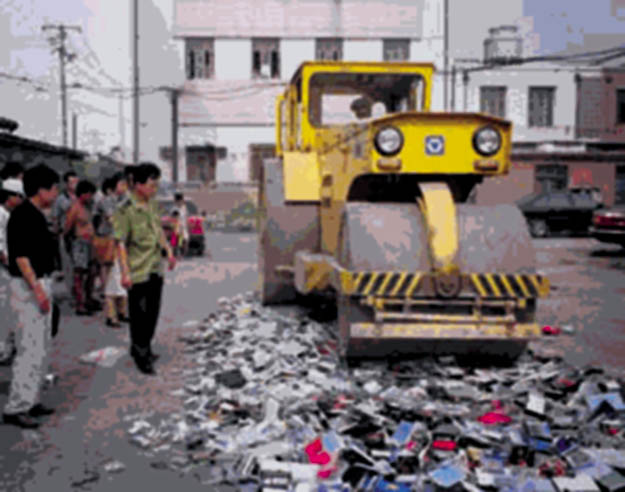
Falun Gong books being symbolically destroyed by the Chinese government

For centuries, governments in China have categorized certain religions as xiéjiào (邪教), translated as "evil cults" or "heterodox teachings". In imperial China, the classification of a religion as xiejiao did not necessarily mean that a religion's teachings were believed to be false or inauthentic; rather, the label was applied to religious groups that were not authorized by the state, or it was applied to religious groups that were believed to challenge the legitimacy of the state. Groups branded xiejiao face suppression and punishment by authorities. One notable group is Falun Gong, a religious movement that became popular in the mid-1990s and was banned by the Chinese government in 1999. The government labeled the group a "xiejiao" several months after launching the crackdown to justify the repression retrospectively.

=== Russia ===
In Russia, anti-cultism emerged in the early 1990s after the Soviet Union's dissolution and the 1991 Coup. In 2008, the Russian Interior Ministry prepared a list of "extremist groups". At the top of the list were Islamic groups outside of "traditional Islam", which is supervised by the Russian government. Next listed were "Pagan cults". In 2009, the Russian Ministry of Justice created a council which it named the "Council of Experts Conducting State Religious Studies Expert Analysis." The new council listed 80 large sects which it considered "potentially dangerous" to Russian society, and it also mentioned that there were thousands of smaller ones. The large sects that were listed included: The Church of Jesus Christ of Latter-day Saints, the Jehovah's Witnesses, and other sects which were loosely referred to as "neo-Pentecostals".

=== United States ===
In the 1970s, the scientific status of the "brainwashing theory" became a central topic in U.S. court cases where the theory was used to try to justify the use of the forceful deprogramming of cult members. Meanwhile, sociologists who were critical of these theories assisted advocates of religious freedom in defending the legitimacy of new religious movements in court.

In the United States the religious activities of cults are protected under the First Amendment of the United States Constitution, which prohibits governmental establishment of religion and protects freedom of religion, freedom of speech, freedom of the press, and freedom of assembly; however, no members of religious groups or cults are granted any special immunity from criminal prosecution.

In 1990, the court case of United States v. Fishman (1990) ended the usage of brainwashing theories by expert witnesses such as Margaret Singer and Richard Ofshe. In the case's ruling, the court cited the Frye standard, which states that the scientific theory which is utilized by expert witnesses must be generally accepted in their respective fields. The court deemed brainwashing to be inadmissible in expert testimonies, using supporting documents which were published by the APA Task Force on Deceptive and Indirect Methods of Persuasion and Control, literature from previous court cases in which brainwashing theories were used, and expert testimonies which were delivered by scholars such as Dick Anthony.

=== Western Europe ===
The governments of France and Belgium have taken policy positions which accept "brainwashing" theories uncritically, while the governments of other European nations, such as those of Sweden and Italy, are cautious with regard to brainwashing and as a result, they have responded more neutrally with regard to new religions. Scholars have suggested that the outrage which followed the mass murder/suicides perpetuated by the Solar Temple, have significantly contributed to European anti-cult positions. The deaths prompted European governments to monitor new non-traditional religious movements, and parliamentary inquests were conducted regarding the issues. In the 1980s, clergymen and officials of the French government expressed concern that some orders and other groups within the Roman Catholic Church would be adversely affected by anti-cult laws which were then being considered.

== See also ==
- Cabal
- Clique
- Cult following
- Cult of personality
- Fanaticism
- New religious movements and cults in popular culture
- Secret society
