= Thought-terminating cliché =

Commonly used phrase used to quell cognitive dissonance

A thought-terminating cliché is a form of loaded language – often passing as folk wisdom – intended to end an argument and bypass cognitive dissonance with a cliché rather than a point. Some such clichés are not inherently terminating and only become so when used to intentionally dismiss dissent or justify fallacies.

The term was popularized by Robert Jay Lifton in his 1961 book Thought Reform and the Psychology of Totalism, who referred to the use of the cliché, along with "loading the language", as "the language of non-thought".

== Origin and definitions ==
R. J. Lifton's definition

The language of the totalist environment is characterized by the thought-terminating cliché. The most far-reaching and complex of human problems are compressed into brief, highly reductive, definitive-sounding phrases, easily memorized, and easily expressed. They become the start and finish of any ideological analysis.

— Thought Reform and the Psychology of Totalism, Chapter 22: "Ideological Totalism" (1961)

The earliest recorded definition of the term was published in Robert Jay Lifton's book Thought Reform and the Psychology of Totalism in 1961 wherein he was describing the structure of language used by the Chinese Communist Party, defining the term as "the start and finish of any ideological analysis". It was listed as the sixth (of eight) totalistic themes. The term is written under the sixth (of eight) criteria for thought reform 'Loading the Language', of which various authors and scholars also consider the term to be a form of loaded language.

Charles 'Chaz' Bufe in his book Alcoholics Anonymous: Cult or Cure? (1997) broadly put the use of the cliché as "thought-stopping phrases (that) include any use of the language, especially repeated phrases, to ward off forbidden thoughts" in describing his interactions with the Alcoholics Anonymous aid movement. Author, show-host and doctor Robert 'Bo' Bennett described the term as describing a substitute for "a person's actual position or argument with a distorted, exaggerated, or misrepresented version of the position of the argument" in his 2017 book Logically Fallacious, along with a proposed logical form of the cliché: "Person 1 makes claim Y. Claim Y sounds catchy. Therefore, claim Y is true."

The Southern California Law Review, Volume 51, Part 1, describes the use of such clichés as "to capture the vehicles of thought and communication; 'Doctrine over reality' (which includes the rewriting of history and reinterpretation of one's past)" and as a property of "ideological totalists".

Bennett gave the opinion that an exception can be made to the use of phrases that would otherwise be thought-terminating, if they are used in a context preceded by evidence or strong claims.

== Examples ==
- "It's not that deep." / "Stop thinking too much." – dismissal of one's criticism of another's logic—or of something in general—by asserting that critical thinking is not necessary in the given situation.
- "You clearly care way too much about this topic." – implies that one's level of concern or interest in a particular topic or situation is excessive, to invalidate any further conversation or exploration.
- "Let people enjoy things." – purports that critical thinking with regards to mass media—or anything in general—is antagonistic and a hindrance to consumers' enjoyment of said media or individuals' enjoyment of a thing.
- "There are worse things in life to worry about." – insinuates the significance of certain issues above others, and that an individual's or others' situation is not significant enough to warrant discussion or action.
- "Here we go again." – exclamation of personal frustration or annoyance; concludes from an individual's point of view that the redundant, cyclical nature of a given disagreement means it will never be resolved.
- "So what? What effect does my action have?" – an individual dismissing their own involvement in a larger cause, on the grounds that they themselves and anyone of their perceived own significance is insignificant and cannot be blamed.
- "Let's agree to disagree." – used by one individual to stop another individual's discussion of an issue, rather than to try to resolve it.
- "It is what it is." – a tautology which proposes that things in general are static or inflexible, and that therefore there is no point in further discussion.
- "Lies of the Devil." – a variation on an exclamation in response to any fact that an individual or group perceives as threatening its integrity.
- "All religions are the same." – acts as a thought-stopper when it is used as a conversational shield to avoid critical thinking or complexity, dismissing deep differences, and avoiding moral or ethical evaluation. According to Keith Ward, this reductive move ignores the specific truth claims that each group asserts about reality. While all religions should be legally equal, religions that are strictly monotheistic cannot be the same as many Eastern religions that allow even for multiple religious belonging.

== In politics ==
Two criticisms made by various journalists are that the cliché tends to halt debate and restrict or censor freedom of speech, or tends to be synonymous with language that would be used by totalitarian states as Lifton originally identified with Communist China. Chancellor Adolf Hitler of Nazi Germany is remarked to have employed such clichés and platitudes to justify his actions prior to and during the events of World War II.

In Joan Didion's essay "Good Citizens", included in her 1979 collection The White Album, Didion writes of the clichés used by the people she sees as comprising 1960s "liberal Hollywood": "It is a way of talking that tends to preclude further discussion, which may well be its intention."

David Volodzko in The Diplomat in 2015 characterized China's justification for persecuting Tibetans, Uyghurs, Falun Gong, artists, and journalists (including Liu Xiaobo), summed up as "for security reasons", as a thought-terminating cliché, going on to say "that's every bit as vapid as 'God moves in a mysterious way' or 'support our troops'. What it really means is that the Party is more important than the people".

== In religion ==
An example of the cliché in use provided by Chaz Bufe is "the admonition given to Catholic schoolchildren to recite the Hail Mary or rosary to ward off 'impure thoughts'. The use of repetitive chanting by the Hare Krishnas serves the same thought-stopping purpose." Christian author Ann Morisy criticized the Christian Church for their uses of such clichés coinciding with their doctrines that intentionally reduce the possibility of dialog, stating that failure to move beyond them risks falling prey "to a new version of gnosticism" along with alienating those not of the faith. Scientology has also been criticized for using protocols, language and lexicons that use thought-terminating clichés to condition its members or to reaffirm a confirmation bias, which makes it difficult for members to think "outside the box".

== Fictional applications ==
- George Orwell's Nineteen Eighty-Four – Newspeak, which in the novel's totalitarian state Oceania is a "pared-down version of English in which 'dangerous' words like 'freedom' no longer exist". Kathleen Taylor wrote in Brainwashing: The Science of Thought Control that the words that remain as a result of the diminishing of the English language are ideologically loaded, and are "clear examples of Lifton's thought-terminating clichés".
- Aldous Huxley's Brave New World – The "Utopian" Society uses thought-terminating clichés more conventionally, most notably regarding the drug soma as well as modified versions of real-life platitudes, such as, "A doctor a day keeps the jim-jams away".

== See also ==
- Brainwashing
- Fighting words
- Gnomic aspect
- Godwin's law
- Indoctrination
- Language in Thought and Action by S. I. Hayakawa
- Learned helplessness
- Loaded language
- Newspeak
- "Politics and the English Language" by George Orwell
- Rage-baiting
- Rhyme-as-reason effect
- Soundbite
- Tautophrase
- Think of the children
