= Thought reform =

Thought reform can refer to:

- Thought Reform:
  - Mind control (or brainwashing, or coercive persuasion)
  - Indoctrination
- Thought Reform and the Psychology of Totalism, a book by Robert Jay Lifton
- Thought reform in the People's Republic of China
