= Brainwash: The Secret History of Mind Control =

Book by Dominic Streatfeild

- First edition
- Author: Dominic Streatfeild
- Published: 2006
- Publisher: Hodder & Stoughton
- Publication place: United Kingdom
- Pages: 440 pp
- ISBN: 0-340-83161-8
- Preceded by: Cocaine: An Unauthorized Biography (2002)

Brainwash: The Secret History of Mind Control (ISBN 0-340-83161-8) is a 2006 non-fiction book published by Hodder & Stoughton about the evolution of brainwashing from its origins in the Cold War through to the war on terror. The author, Dominic Streatfeild, uses formerly classified documentation and interviews from the CIA, U.S. Army, MI5, MI6 and British Intelligence Corps to investigate the methods intended to destroy and reconstruct the minds of captives, to extract information and convert dissidents. Brainwash is Streatfeild's third book, following on from his 2002 book, Cocaine: An Unauthorised Biography.

Brainwash covers a wide range of disturbing techniques used to subvert the human will, ranging from inducing chemical imbalance through stressing (wall standing, hooding and malnutrition), sensory deprivation, hypnosis, the 'Deep Narcosis' therapy employed by Dr William Sargant and Ewan Cameron, subliminal messaging, socialisation and various forms of brainwashing.

The author investigates the use of these techniques by the CIA, British Intelligence Services (against the IRA), the KGB, large corporations, the Moonies, and various Satanic abuse trials in the 1980s and 1990s.

Brainwash details the work carried out by William Sargant and Donald Ewan Cameron (both now deceased) on the MKULTRA project before becoming disillusioned with the results after the pair had destroyed the health, memories and lives of countless patients.

== Samuel Johnson Award ==
Post publication, Brainwash was nominated for the Samuel Johnson Prize in 2007. The book was then longlisted and ultimately shortlisted for the 2007 prize but lost out to Imperial Life in the Emerald City by Rajiv Chandrasekaran.
