= Brainwashing: The Science of Thought Control =

2004 book by Kathleen Taylor

Brainwashing
- Book cover
- Author: Kathleen Taylor
- Language: English
- Subject: Brainwashing
- Genre: Social psychology
- Publisher: Oxford University Press
- Publication date: 16 December 2004
- Publication place: United Kingdom
- Media type: Hardcover
- Pages: 336
- ISBN: 0-19-280496-0
- OCLC: 56648968
- Dewey Decimal: 153.853 22
- LC Class: BF633 .T39 2004

Brainwashing: The Science of Thought Control is a 2004 popular science book explaining brainwashing, mind control, thought reform, and coercive persuasion by neuroscientist and physiologist Kathleen Taylor. It explains the neurological basis for reasoning and cognition in the brain, and proposes that the self is changeable, and describes the physiology of neurological pathways. It reviews case studies including Patty Hearst, Charles Manson, and the mass murder/suicide of members of Peoples Temple at Jonestown, and compares the techniques of influence used by cults to those of totalitarian, communist societies, and Islamic states. It lays out a model FACET – Freedom, Agency, Complexity, Ends-not-means, and Thinking – which she believes can be used to negate the influence of brainwashing techniques.

== Contents ==
Taylor provides background on the development of the term brainwashing, from its use in 1950 by journalist Edward Hunter and its later usage as applied to the spheres of cults, marketing, influence, thought reform, torture, and re-education. She references psychiatrist Robert Jay Lifton's work Thought Reform and the Psychology of Totalism as a resource throughout the book. Lifton based his research on interviews he conducted with prisoners of war who had been subjected to indoctrination and torture during the Korean War. Taylor argues that the term brainwashing is useful to when used to refer to a more coercive form of persuasion.

She explains the neurological basis for reasoning and cognition in the brain, and brings the point across that the self itself is changeable. She describes the physiology behind neurological pathways which include webs of neurons containing dendrites, axons, and synapses; and explains that certain brains with more rigid pathways will be less susceptible to new information or creative stimuli. Taylor utilizes neurological science to show that brainwashed individuals have more rigid pathways, and that rigidity can make it unlikely that the individual will rethink situations or be able to later reorganize these pathways. She explains that repetition is an integral part of brainwashing techniques because connections between neurons become stronger when exposed to incoming signals of frequency and intensity. She argues that people in their teenage years and early twenties are more susceptible to persuasion. Taylor explains that brain activity in the temporal lobe, the region responsible for artistic creativity, also causes spiritual experiences in a process known as lability.

In the Part I of the book, titled: "Torture and seduction", Taylor analyzes how various parties have used certain techniques in influencing and brainwashing others, including a restriction of individual freedoms, deception, and methods that conflict with one's decision-making processes.

She utilizes case studies including Patty Hearst, the Manson Family, and the mass murder/suicide of members of Peoples Temple at Jonestown to illustrate the neurology she explains in Part II, "The traitor in your skull". In the case of the Manson Family followers of Charles Manson carried out multiple murders in 1969, and with Peoples Temple over 900 followers of charismatic leader Jim Jones died in 1978 in Jonestown, Guyana, after consuming cyanide. Taylor asserts that the techniques used by cults to influence others are similar to those used by other social groups, and compares similar totalitarian aspects of cults and communist societies.

These techniques include isolating the individual and controlling their access to information, challenging their belief structure and creating doubt, and repeating messages in a pressurized environment. According to Taylor, cults emphasize positive aspects of the group over negative aspects of outsiders, endlessly repeat simple ideas in "highly reductive, definitive – sounding phrases", and refer to "abstract and ambiguous" ideas associated with "huge emotional baggage". Taylor writes that brainwashing involves a more intense version of the way the brain traditionally learns.

In the final portion of the book, Part III: "Freedom and Control", Taylor describes an individual's susceptibility to brainwashing and lays out an acronym "FACET", a tool to combat influence and a totalist mindset. FACET stands for Freedom, Agency, Complexity, Ends-not-means, and Thinking. The FACET model is based on Lifton's eight criteria for thought reform, and Taylor emphasizes education and freedom of thought as a way to negate some of these criteria.

== Reception ==
Brainwashing was first published in hardcover format on 16 December 2004 by Oxford University Press, and again in paperback format on 24 August 2006. The book was "highly commended" and runner-up in the 2005 Times Higher Education Supplement Young Academic Author Award, and also made it to the shortlist for the 2005 MIND "Book of the Year Award". The book also made it to the longlist of the 2005 Aventis "Science Book Prize", where it was described as containing "elegant and accessible prose".

PD Smith gave the book a positive review in The Guardian, and concluded: "Her ambitious and well-written study celebrates human freedom through a history of attempts to destroy it." Joseph Szimhart reviewed the book for Skeptical Inquirer, and wrote: "I enjoyed the book as a challenge to think about a sorely neglected topic." Szimhart concluded: "Taylor's concern is with any human venture (be it science, religion, or politics) that restricts brain function from creative 'stop and think' activity, and which becomes little more than another exclusive cult."

In a review of the book for The Daily Telegraph, British doctor and science writer James Le Fanu was critical, and commented that Taylor did not acknowledge "the explanatory gap" between current understanding of the brain's structure and "what it does, how we think, feel and emote". Le Fanu concluded, "The paradox of Brainwashing is that it would have been a much more interesting book if Dr Taylor had pursued the contrarian view of seeking to explain why that 'explanatory gap' is not merely unbridged but, with the advance of the neurosciences, now seems to be unbridgeable. A brain that was simple enough to be fully known would be too simple to contain conscious observers who might know it."

Nigel Hawkes of The Times criticized what he saw as Taylor's conclusion that "we are all a little bit brainwashed by our culture and experience" and noted that this assessment places Jim Jones of the Peoples Temple group in the same classification as the tabloid press. A review in Financial Times by Jerome Burne was also critical, and he commented that Taylor does not convey "a clear enough message" in the work.

Peter Knight believes that Taylor sufficiently "argues that there is no need to invoke the notion of brainwashing as a mysterious and fear-inducing explanation as a last resort" – to Taylor, "brainwashing is less scary than people might think because it is in fact not some magical, secret and ultra-efficient technique of thought control" but a "mundane and ubiquitous" neurological phenomenon that can be understood scientifically.

Alan W. Scheflin, writing for Nova Religio, believes that the book is a "solid and welcome contribution to the brainwashing literature". He calls the book a "very valuable field manual" in the "battle" for people's minds in the twenty-first century.

== See also ==
- Thought Reform and the Psychology of Totalism, by Robert Jay Lifton
- Brain-Washing (book)
- Cult
- Communism
- Deprogramming
