= Thought Reform and the Psychology of Totalism =

1961 non-fiction book by Robert Jay Lifton

- Book cover, 1963 edition
- Author: Robert Jay Lifton, M.D.
- Translator: Richard Jaffe (Chinese)
- Cover artist: Shelley Gruendler
- Language: English
- Subject: Psychology; Brainwashing; Mind control
- Genre: Non-fiction
- Publisher: Norton, New York (1961, first edition); University of North Carolina Press (reprint)
- Publication date: 1961, 1989 (UNC Press reprint)
- Publication place: United States
- Media type: Paperback
- Pages: 524 (1989 reprint)
- ISBN: 0-8078-4253-2
- OCLC: 19388265
- Dewey Decimal: 153.8/53/0951 19
- LC Class: BF633 .L5 1989

Thought Reform and the Psychology of Totalism: A Study of "Brainwashing" in China is a non-fiction book by psychiatrist Robert Jay Lifton on the psychology of brainwashing.

Lifton's research for the book began in 1953 with a series of interviews with American servicemen who had been held captive during the Korean War. In addition to interviews with 25 Americans, Lifton also interviewed 15 Chinese who had fled their homeland after having been subjected to indoctrination in Chinese universities. From these interviews, which in some cases occurred regularly for over a year, Lifton identified the tactics used by Chinese communists to cause drastic shifts in one's opinions and personality and "brainwash" American soldiers into making demonstrably false assertions.

The book was first published in 1961, by W. W. Norton & Co., in New York. The 1989 reprint edition was published by University of North Carolina Press. Lifton was a Distinguished Professor of Psychiatry at the John Jay College of Criminal Justice, City University of New York.

== Main points ==
In the book, Lifton outlines the "Eight Criteria for Thought Reform":

1. Milieu Control. The group or its leaders controls information and communication both within the environment and, ultimately, within the individual, resulting in a significant degree of isolation from society at large.
2. Mystical Manipulation. The group manipulates experiences that appear spontaneous to demonstrate divine authority, spiritual advancement, or some exceptional talent or insight that sets the leader and/or group apart from humanity, and that allows a reinterpretation of historical events, scripture, and other experiences. Coincidences and happenstance oddities are interpreted as omens or prophecies.
3. Demand for Purity. The group constantly exhorts members to view the world as black and white, conform to the group ideology, and strive for perfection. The induction of guilt and/or shame is a powerful control device used here.
4. Confession. The group defines sins that members should confess either to a personal monitor or publicly to the group. There is no confidentiality; the leaders discuss and exploit members' "sins," "attitudes," and "faults".
5. Sacred Science. The group's doctrine or ideology is considered to be the ultimate Truth, beyond all questioning or dispute. Truth is not to be found outside the group. The leader, as the spokesperson for God or all humanity, is likewise above criticism.
6. Loading the Language. The group interprets or uses words and phrases in new ways so that often the outside world does not understand. This jargon consists of thought-terminating clichés, which serve to alter members' thought processes to conform to the group's way of thinking.
7. Doctrine over person. Members' personal experiences are subordinate to the sacred science; members must deny or reinterpret any contrary experiences to fit the group ideology.
8. Dispensing of existence. The group has the prerogative to decide who has the right to exist and who does not. This is usually not literal but means that those in the outside world are not saved, unenlightened, unconscious, and must be converted to the group's ideology. If they do not join the group or are critical of the group, then they must be rejected by the members. Thus, the outside world loses all credibility. In conjunction, should any member leave the group, he or she must be rejected also.

== Thought-terminating cliché ==
Thought Reform and the Psychology of Totalism popularized the term "thought-terminating cliché". This refers to a cliché that is a commonly used phrase, or folk wisdom, sometimes used to quell cognitive dissonance. Though the clichéd phrase in and of itself may be valid in certain contexts, its application as a means of dismissing dissent or justifying fallacious logic is what makes it thought-terminating.

Examples include "Everything happens for a reason", "Why? Because I said so" (Bare assertion fallacy), "I'm the parent, that's why" (Appeal to authority), "To each his own", "It's a matter of opinion!", "You only live once" (YOLO), and "We will have to agree to disagree".

Lifton said:

The language of the totalist environment is characterized by the thought-terminating cliché. The most far-reaching and complex of human problems are compressed into brief, highly reductive, definitive-sounding phrases, easily memorized and easily expressed. These become the start and finish of any ideological analysis.

In George Orwell's 1949 novel Nineteen Eighty-Four, the fictional constructed language Newspeak is designed to eliminate the ability to express unorthodox thoughts. Aldous Huxley's Brave New World society uses thought-terminating clichés in a more conventional manner, most notably regarding the drug soma as well as modified versions of real-life platitudes, such as "A doctor a day keeps the jim-jams away".

In her 1963 book Eichmann in Jerusalem, Hannah Arendt described Adolf Eichmann as a pseudo-intellectual who used clichés and platitudes to justify his actions and the role he played in the Jewish genocide of World War II. For her, these phrases are symptomatic of an absence of thought. She wrote that:

"[w]hen confronted with situations for which such routine procedures did not exist, he [Eichmann] was helpless, and his cliché-ridden language produced on the stand, as it had evidently done in his official life, a kind of macabre comedy. Clichés, stock phrases, adherence to conventional, standardized codes of expression and conduct have the socially recognized function of protecting us against reality, that is, against the claim on our thinking attention that all events and facts make by their existence."

== See also ==
- Brainwashing
- Buzzword
- Communism
- Cult
- Indoctrination
- Loaded language
- Platitude
- Propaganda
- Self-criticism (Marxism–Leninism)
- Struggle session
