= Leonard Neff =

American psychiatrist

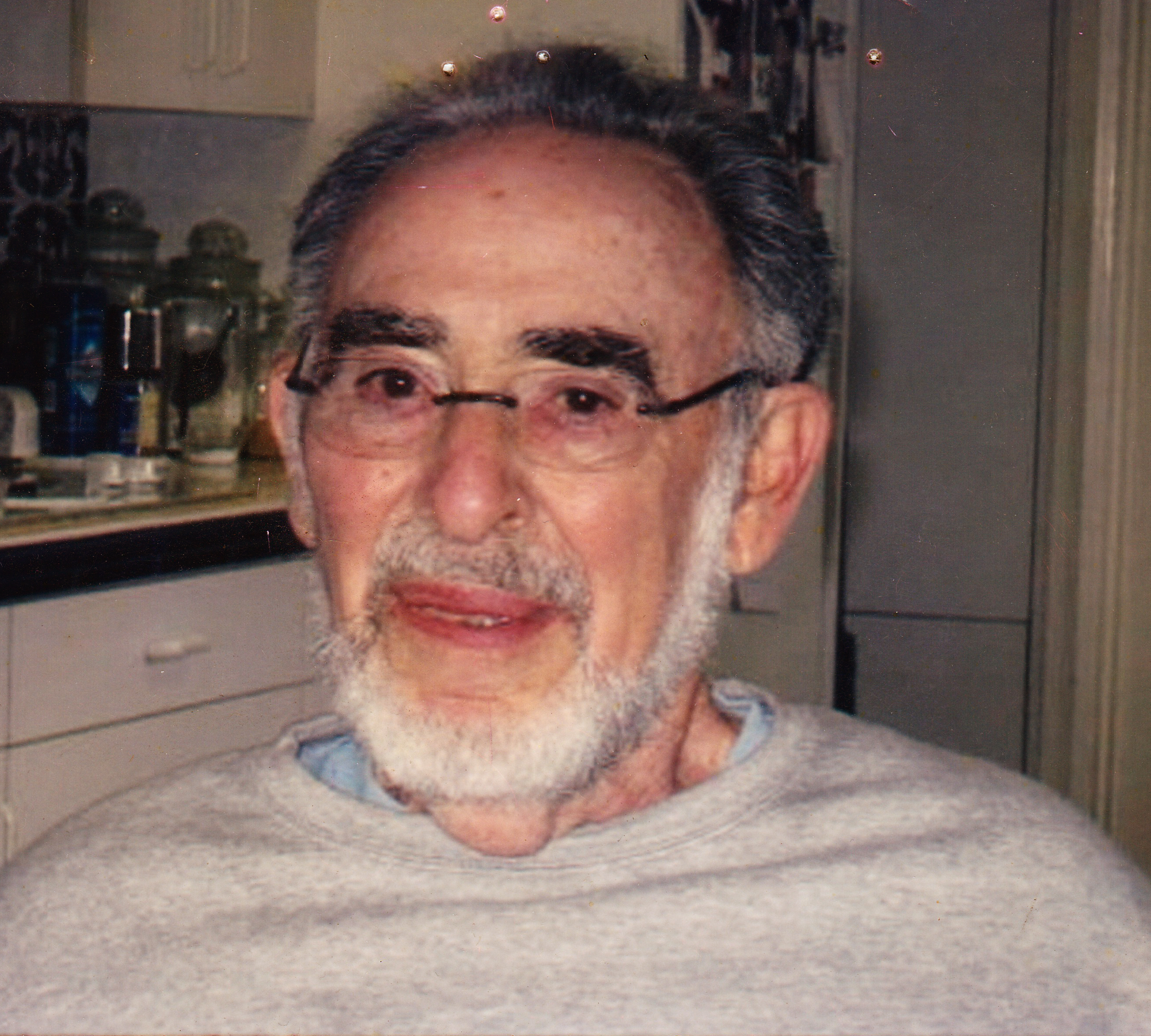
Neff at his home in Los Angeles, California, shortly before his death in 2006.

Leonard Neff (July 8, 1925 – March 26, 2006) was an American psychiatrist, known for his work with military veterans and adolescents and his work on post-traumatic stress disorder (PTSD). Neff was also known for his successful resolution of a high-profile hostage event which took place in Los Angeles, California in 1974 and in which three people were held at gunpoint by a Vietnam War veteran who was experiencing a flashback to his wartime experiences.

== Early life and education ==
Neff was born in Peoria, Illinois on July 8, 1925. He studied at the University of Illinois before being drafted in the U.S. Army, where he served in the Pacific Theater of World War II but did not experience combat.

== Career ==
=== Work with veterans ===
Neff was a founding member of the Vietnam Veteran's Working Group, a group of mental health professionals who met at a meeting of the American Psychological Association in Anaheim, California in the early 1970s and who believed that veterans of the Vietnam War often experienced a unique set of psychological problems that were not being addressed by the greater mental health care community. In her 2005 autobiography My Life So Far, Jane Fonda describes Neff's work with Vietnam veterans, along with that of fellow psychiatrists Robert Lifton, Chaim Shatan, and Sarah Haley, as "tireless and empathetic".

=== 1974 hostage event ===
In 1974 a 22-year-old Vietnam veteran named Johnny Gabron escaped from the Brentwood, California Veteran's Administration hospital while having a flashback to his combat experiences in Vietnam. He took three people hostage at gunpoint in Griffith Park, Los Angeles, and subsequently demanded to speak to his psychiatrist, Neff. Neff was flown in by helicopter (police blockades and news coverage caused the area of the city around the park to become gridlocked soon after incident began), and three hours later was able to end the armed standoff without incident. The issue increased public awareness of PTSD.

=== Later career ===
In 1995, Neff and his wife Essie, a psychotherapist, established the Child Development Institute in Woodland Hills, Los Angeles.

== Death ==
Neff died on March 26, 2006, at his home in Sherman Oaks, Los Angeles, at the age of 80, of pancreatic cancer.
