= Shatan =

Shatan may refer to:

- Shatans, odd-looking creatures of Belarusian mythology
- Chaim F. Shatan (1924–2001), Canadian psychiatrist
- Shatan, Sichuan, a town in Wanyuan, Sichuan, China
- Meijiuhe, a town in Renhuai, Guizhou, China, known as Shatan before 2016
