= Milieu (disambiguation) =

A milieu is a social environment.

Milieu may also refer to:

- Le Milieu, a common term for Organized crime in France
- Milieu River (Normandin River), a tributary of Poutrincourt Lake, Lac-Ashuapmushuan, Quebec, Canada
- Mont de Milieu, a Premier cru vineyard in Chablis, France

== See also ==
- Milieu control, a term to describe tactics that control environment and human communication through the use of social pressure and group language
- Milieu intérieur, in biology, the extra-cellular fluid environment
- Milieu therapy, a form of psychotherapy that involves the use of therapeutic communities
