= Kim Joong-sik =

South Korean poet

Kim Joong-sik (Korean: 김중식) is a South Korean poet. He came to prominence with the publication of his 1999 poetry collection, Hwanggeumbit moseori (황금빛 모서리 The Edge of the Golden Sun) in which he conducted a thorough self-examination characterized by his sharp intuition and detailed observations. After the publication of his first poetry collection, he worked as a reporter and a public servant for an extended period of time during which he did not write any poetry. He worked at the South Korean Government Information Agency, the office of the Presidential Secretariat, and the South Korean embassy in Iran. In 2018, he published his second poetry collection.

== Life ==
Kim Joong-sik was born in Incheon, South Korea in 1967. He made his debut in January 1990 with the publication of his poem "Ajikdo sinpajeogin ildeuri" (아직도 신파적인 일들이 Still Melodramatic Ordeals) and other poems in Monthly Literature & Thought. In the same year, he graduated from Seoul National University from the Department of Korean Language and Literature. After graduation, in order to fulfill his "dream of living without a regular job", he reportedly stated that he designated a period of two years during which he would live without a regular job. He received much attention upon the publication of his first poetry collection, Hwanggeumbit moseori, in 1999. However, after the publication of this poetry collection, he was silent for a long period of time.

In 1995, he began working as a reporter in the culture department for newspaper companies. Although he resigned after ten years because he had grown fatigued with work life, he began working at the Government Information Agency in 2007 as a contracted civil servant in order to make a living. In 2007, he organized policy for the Roh Moo-hyun administration and the following year, with the inauguration of the Lee Myung-bak administration, he began working at the office of the Presidential Secretariat as a speech writer. From 2012 to 2015, he was dispatched to the Korean Embassy in Iran and worked as a public relations officer. With this experience as the foundation, he published a serialized column in Kyunghyang Shinmun beginning in 2016 titled "Kim siinui pereusia sanchaek" (김 시인의 페르시아 산책 Poet Kim's Stroll Through Persia), and in 2017, these writings were compiled and published as Iran-pereusia baramui gireul geotda (이란-페르시아 바람의 길을 걷다 Walking Through the Air of Iran and Persia). Afterwards, he worked as a member of the policy committee for a partisan policy research center.

In 2018, he broke his long silence with the publication of another poetry collection. In this second poetry collection, he also states the reason for his long break from writing poetry. He stated that he was a "fundamentalist" regarding poetry, and reflected on how he used to think that authors who simultaneously held regular jobs were all fakes. That is, he thought that in order to write poetry, one could not hold another job and must solely devote themselves to the act of writing poetry. Yet he stated that after experiencing working life and having a public career, his thoughts have changed. His second poetry collection reflects such changes in his attitude regarding poetry and life.

== Writing ==
=== Hwanggeumbit moseori (1999) ===
Kim Joong-sik's poetry typically departs from a point of self-confession. Hwanggeumbit moseori portrays variations of self-confessions in diverse ways and in this manner, Kim vividly brings his outlook on the world and mentality in sharp relief. In his poetry collection, this self-confession proceeds from a thorough awareness on the realities of life. While he confesses to a pathetic and destitute life that arises from greed in the face of not finding fair opportunities, he also asserts that blaming a destitute life solely as the fault of society's coercion is also a kind of self-deception. Instead of blaming life, Kim turns his gaze more thoroughly on his own self and his daily life. In the process of analyzing his own life, Kim confesses that he is no different than others who live vulgar and coarse lives.

This kind of tendency is not just a reflection of the author's individual disposition; rather, it is related to the larger circumstances of the 1990s. The belief in the abundance of societal progress of the 1980s becomes doubtful with the onset of the 1990s. With regard to this era, Kim Joong-sik stated that "It is a generation that, although sensing that something went wrong, lacks a proper target to take aim at." The only thing that a generation unable to find a clear ideological orientation can do is "go through a miraculous metamorphosis like a butterfly" and adapt to the world, or "bang around and get flogged." Although the poet makes sarcastic remarks upon seeing people who transformed like a butterfly, he does not see a great difference between them and his own self. This is because in a world where the manifestation of ideology becomes colorless, it is impossible to avoid a pathetic and dirty life. In this sense, the impossibility of avoiding a pathetic life also entails a continuous self-reflection. Thus, the poet's confession takes shape through an exhaustive reflection on how one's own life is lived.

=== Return After 25 Years ===
Although Kim only released one poetry collection and was inactive for 25 years, Hwanggeumbit moseori remained the talk of the town for a long time. The long relevance of Hwanggeumbit moseori can be attributed to many readers' ability to empathize with the poet's detailed self-reflection and sensitive observations. However, this does not entirely account for Hwanggeumbit moseori's success. This is because Hwanggeumbit moseori also earned high praise for demonstrating a free poetic form while simultaneously adhering to the fundamental characteristics of a poem. The use of poetic language and the poems' formal qualities also left a strong impression on readers. Kim's poetry can be seen as the product of a fierce struggle over language before self-reflection and self-criticism. In this manner, the fierce struggle to find the appropriate word or language, in which poetry and life are equated with each other, arises from his "fundamentalist demeanor." At the time of Hwanggeumbit moseori's publication, Kim revealed that he thought this "uncontrollable life" where one became either a "revolutionary or a monk" was the "path of the poet." From its content to its form, Hwanggeumbit moseori demonstrates the poet's strict behavior that led to his silence for 25 years.

Kim's attitudes towards poetry are shown to have slightly changed with the 2018 publication of Uljido motaetda (울지도 못했다 Unable to Even Cry). If Hwanggeumbit moseori details the poet's sharp intuition facing the abject aspects of the world, Uljido motaetda turns the poet's gaze to focus on people's lives and the love that exists even within this abject world. While his sharp usage of refined language remains the same, the poetic diction is more embracing and inclusive. [14] Through relentless criticism and confession regarding his own self, he renders the difficult to imagine "Mirae bijeon" (미래 비전 Future Vision), a poem that attempts to accomplish this beginning with its very title. Of course, Uljido motaetda does not entirely discard a pessimistic diagnosis of life. However, this poetry collection, even as it seems like a "desolate landscape," is filled with the conviction that each and every person busily continues life. Flowers bloom from "life and love on earth," and earth cannot be defined entirely as heaven nor hell.

However, this "love" that prevents life from becoming heaven or hell is not visible to the eyes. Because of this, love in Uljido motaetda is generally constructed through auditory and olfactory senses. Yet the opportunity to sense this is precisely the poet's meeting with "you". In the poem "Gyeongcheong" (경청 Closely Listening), "I" comes to open their ears through meeting "you". In "Gyeongcheong", love is portrayed as the act of closing one's mouth and instead closely listening, and it is through this act that the poet is able to hear the "noises overrunning the desolate landscape". By realizing that listening is more precious than speaking, Uljido motaetda shows more spatially expanded prospects than his previous collection.

== Works ==
=== Poetry collections ===
《황금빛 모서리》, 문학과지성사, 1999 / Hwanggeumbit moseori (The Edge of the Golden Sun), Moonji, 1999.

《울지도 못했다》, 문학과지성사, 2018 / Uljido motaetda (Unable to Even Cry), Moonji, 2018.

=== Travel writing ===
《이란-페르시아 바람의 길을 걷다》, 문학세계사, 2017 / Iran-pereusia baramui gireul geotda (Walking Through the Air of Iran and Persia), Munhak Segyesa, 2017.
