= Joost Meerloo =

Dutch-American physician (1903–1976)

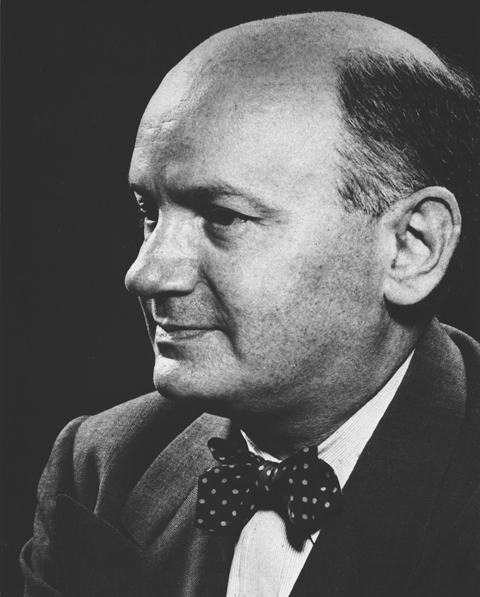
- Joost Abraham Maurits Meerloo
- Born: March 14, 1903; The Hague, Netherlands
- Died: November 17, 1976; Amsterdam, Netherlands
- Occupations: Doctor of Medicine and psychoanalyst
- Notable work: Book "Rape of the Mind" (1956)

Joost Abraham Maurits Meerloo (March 14, 1903 – November 17, 1976) was a Dutch-American psychoanalyst. He authored Rape of the Mind, an analysis of brainwashing techniques and thought control in totalitarian states.

== Biography ==
Born as Abraham Maurits Meerloo in The Hague, Netherlands, Meerloo came to United States in 1946, was naturalized in 1950, and resumed Dutch citizenship in 1972. Dr. Meerloo practiced psychiatry for over forty years. He did staff work in the Netherlands until 1942 under Nazi occupation, when he assumed the name Joost (instead of the more Jewish-sounding Abraham) to fool the occupying forces. In 1942 he fled to Belgium, and from there he escaped to England (after barely eluding death at the hands of the Germans). He became a colonel and was chief of the Psychological Department of the Dutch Army-in-Exile in England.

After the war, he served as High Commissioner for Welfare in the Netherlands, and was an adviser to UNRRA and SHAEF. An American citizen since 1950, Dr. Meerloo was a member of the faculty at Columbia University and associate professor of psychiatry at the New York School of Psychiatry. He was the author of many books, including Rape of the Mind (a classic work on brainwashing), Conversation and Communication, and Hidden Communion.

He was the son of Bernard and Anna Frederika (Benjamins) Meerloo. He was the youngest of six children and the only one to escape his occupied country and survive the Holocaust.

He married Elisabeth Johanna Kalf Den Haag, on May 16, 1928. The couple divorced on February 19, 1946. He subsequently married Louisa Betty "Loekie" Duits, a physical therapist, in New York City on May 7, 1948.

Meerloo specialized in the area of thought control techniques used by totalitarian and other regimes.

== Education ==
Dr. Meerloo received an M.D. degree at the University of Leiden in 1927. He then did postgraduate work in psychiatry and psychoanalysis, receiving a Ph.D. at the University of Utrecht in 1932. He later continued psychiatric studies in Paris.

== Rape of the Mind ==
Meerloo's best-known book is Rape of the Mind, published in 1956. This book received wide attention in part because it dealt with totalitarian applications of brainwashing techniques during the Korean War. It explains how scientific brainwashing is done and argues that "hardly anyone can resist such." "Fear, and continual pressure are known to create a menticidal hypnosis. The conscious part of the personality no longer takes part in the automatic confessions. The brainwashee lives in a trance, repeating the record grooved into him by somebody else."

Like their totalitarian counterparts, democratic societies are subject to the insidious influences of mind control. Such influences surround the citizens of free societies, "both on a political and a nonpolitical level and they become as dangerous to the free way of life as are the aggressive totalitarian governments themselves." People must guard against the creeping intrusion into their minds by technology, bureaucracy, prejudice, and mass delusion.

Meerloo writes that freedom and democracy depend in part on education for mental freedom—helping children and adults to think for themselves and to see the essentials of a problem—helping them to understand concepts, not merely to memorize facts.

Throughout most of the book, Meerloo's targets are the historic roles of the Nazis and of the Communists in the post-1945 world. However, he also attacks the witch-hunting of individuals through the House Un-American Activities Committee: "the Congressional right to investigate can be abused and misused. The power to investigate may become the power to destroy -- not only the man under attack, but also the mental integrity of those who, in one way or another, are witnesses to the investigation. In a subtle way, the current wave of Congressional investigations may have a coercive effect on our citizenry." (117)

== Bibliography ==
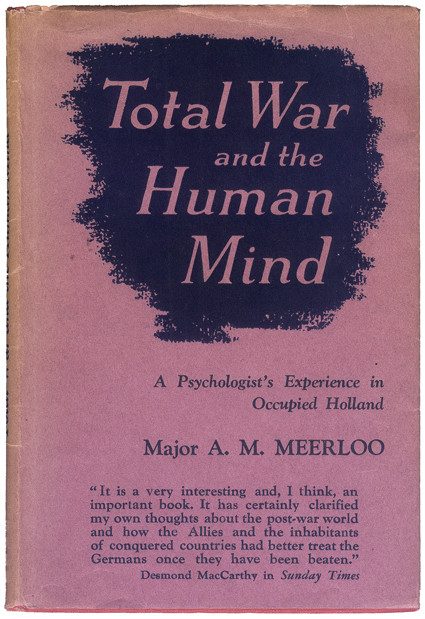
Dust jacket Total War and the Human Mind

- Total War and the Human Mind: A Psychologist's Experience in Occupied Holland (1944, Published for The Netherlands Government Information Bureau by George Allen & Unwin Ltd.)
- Delusion and Mass-Delusion (1949, NMD Monographs)
- Patterns of Panic (1950, International Universities Press, Inc.)
- Conversation and Communication (1952, International Universities Press, Inc.)
- The Two Faces of Man (1954, International Universities Press, Inc)
- The Rape of the Mind: The Psychology of Thought Control, Menticide, and Brainwashing (1956, World Publishing Company)(Reprinted 2009, Progressive Press, ISBN 1-61577-376-2)
- Dance Craze and Sacred Dance, 1960
- The dance, from ritual to rock and roll—ballet to ballroom, 1960, Philadelphia, Chilton Co., Book Division
- Guidance in an Age of Technology (1961)
- Suicide and Mass Suicide (1962, Grune & Stratton, Inc.)
- Hidden Communion (1964, Garrett Publications/Helix Press)
- A Psycho-Analytic Study of Culture and Character (1965, John Wiley)
- "Creativity and Eternization: Essays on the Creative Instinct" (1967, Koninklijke Van Gorcum & Comp. N.V.; Assen, The Netherlands)
- Along the Fourth Dimension: Man's Sense of Time and History (1970, The John Day Company)
- Unobtrusive Communication. Essays in Psycholinguistics (1964, Koninklijke van Gorcum & Co. N. V.)

== See also ==
- Brainwashing
- Brave New World Revisited
- Edward Bernays
- Sigmund Freud
- Totalitarianism

== Sources ==
- Biography Resource Center
- Contemporary Authors Online, Gale, 2002
- Publisher's notes on dust cover Along the Fourth Dimension: Man's Sense of Time and History (1970, The John Day Company)
