= Milieu control =

Sociological tactic

Milieu control is a term popularized by psychiatrist Robert Jay Lifton to describe tactics that control environment and human communication through the use of social pressure and group language. This includes tactics such as dogma, protocols, innuendo, slang, and pronunciation, which enables group members to identify other members, or to promote cognitive changes in individuals. Lifton originally used "milieu control" to describe brainwashing and mind control, but the term has since been applied to other contexts.

== Background ==
Milieu control involves the control of communication within a group environment, that also may (or may not) result in a significant degree of isolation from surrounding society. When non-group members, or outsiders, are considered or potentially labeled as less valuable without basis for stated group-supported and group-reinforced prejudice, group members may have a tendency to then consider themselves as intellectually superior, which can limit alternate points of view, thus becoming a self-fulfilling prophecy in which group members automatically begin to devalue others and the intellect of others that are separate from their group, without logical rationale for doing so. Additionally, Milieu control "includes other techniques to restrict members' contact with the outside world and to be able to make critical, rational judgments about information."

== See also ==
- Politico-media complex
- Brainwashing
