= Betty Jean Lifton =

American author (1926-2010)

- Born: Blanche Rosenblatt; June 11, 1926; Staten Island, New York
- Died: November 19, 2010 (aged 86); Boston, Massachusetts

Betty Jean Lifton was an American author known for her children's books as well as books about the experiences of adopted children and her own experiences as an adopted person.

== Early life and education ==
Betty Jean Lifton was born Blanche Rosenblatt on June 11, 1926, in Staten Island, New York. She was born to Rae Rosenblatt, who first placed her in the Home for Hebrew Infants in the Bronx and later in the Louise Wise Adoption Agency in New York City. Lifton was adopted at age two by Oscar and Hilda Kirschner, and her name after adoption became Betty Jean Kirschner. Both her biological parents and her adoptive parents were Jewish. She grew up in Cincinnati, Ohio.

Lifton graduated from Barnard College in 1948 with a bachelors degree in English.

== Career ==
Lifton and her husband, Robert Jay Lifton, who was a U.S. Air Force psychiatrist at the time, resided in Japan and Hong Kong during the 1950s. Around this time Lifton began writing children's books, including Joji and the Dragon, The Dwarf Pine Tree, and The Rice-cake Rabbit. Her collaboration with the Japanese photographer Eikoh Hosoe produced four additional books, including Taka-chan and I, A Dog's Guide to Tokyo, A Place Called Hiroshima, and Return to Hiroshima. Her 1972 children's book, Children of Vietnam, was a finalist for the 1973 National Book Award.

In 1975, Lifton published Twice Born: Memoirs of an Adopted Daughter, which was about her search for her birth mother. It also included details of her life in Japan in the 1960s as well as the difficulty of adoptees who sought copies of their own pre-adoption birth records. The publication of Twice Born, in addition to the recent publication of the 1973 book The Search for Anna Fisher by Florence Fisher, built momentum for a developing reform movement focusing on the rights of adult adopted people.

Lifton wrote additional books about adoption, including Lost and Found: The Adoption Experience, Journey of the Adopted Self: A Quest for Wholeness, and the children's books Tell Me a Real Adoption Story and I'm Still Me.

In 1988, Lifton published The King of Children, a biography of the Polish-Jewish pediatrician and children's author Janusz Korczak, who perished in the Holocaust along with the children from his orphanage.

In 1992 Lifton earned a Ph.D. in counseling psychology from Union Institute, and she worked for a number of years, both in New York and in Massachusetts, as a therapist in private practice.

== Personal life ==
In 1952, Betty Jean Kirschner married the psychiatrist and author Robert Jay Lifton, with whom she had two children.

== Death and legacy ==
Lifton died on November 19, 2010, in Boston, Massachusetts. Her papers are in the Schlesinger Library on the History of Women in America, at the Harvard Radcliffe Institute.

== Selected publications ==
=== Children’s fiction ===
- Lifton, Betty Jean. Joji and the Dragon. Illustrated by Eiichi Mitsui. New York: William Morrow, 1957.
- —. Mogo the Mynah. Illustrated by Anne Scott. New York: Morrow, 1958.
- —. Joji and the Fog. Illustrated by Eiichi Mitsui. New York: Morrow, 1959.
- —. Kap the Kappa. Illustrated by Eiichi Mitsui. New York: Morrow, 1960.
- —. The Dwarf Pine Tree. Illustrated by Fuku Akino. New York: Atheneum, 1963.
- —. Joji and the Amanojaku. Illustrated by Eiichi Mitsui. New York: Norton, 1965.
- —. The Cock and the Ghost Cat. Illustrated by Fuku Akino. New York: Atheneum, 1965.
- —. The Rice-Cake Rabbit. Illustrated by Eiichi Mitsui. New York: Norton, 1966.
- —. The Many Lives of Chio and Goro. Illustrated by Yasuo Segawa. New York: Norton, 1966.
- —. Life as Runcible, Betty Jean (text) & photographs by Eikoh Hosoe. Taka-Chan and I: A Dog’s Journey to Japan. New York: Norton, 1967.
- —. Kap and the Wicked Monkey. Illustrated by Eiichi Mitsui. New York: Norton, 1968.
- —. The Secret Seller. Illustrated by Etienne Delessert. New York: Norton, 1968.
- —. The One-Legged Ghost. Illustrated by Fuku Akino. New York: Atheneum, 1968.
- —. The Mud Snail Son. Illustrated by Fuku Akino. New York: Atheneum, 1971.
- —. The Silver Crane. Illustrated by Laszlo Kubinyi. New York: Seabury Press, 1971.
- —. Good Night, Orange Monster. Illustrated by Cyndy Szekeres. New York: Atheneum, 1972.
- —. Jaguar, My Twin. Illustrated by Ann Leggett. New York: Atheneum, 1976.
- —. I’m Still Me. New York: Knopf, 1981.
- —. Tell Me a Real Adoption Story. Illustrated by Claire A. Nivola. New York: Knopf, 1994.

=== Children's theatre ===
- Moon Walk: A Rock Musical, music and lyrics by The Open Window (produced New York, 1970).
- —. ‘‘Kap the Kappa’’ (adaptation of her own story), in *Contemporary Children’s Theater*, ed. by Jane Lifton [or “Lifton”] and others. New York: Avon, 1974.
- —. A Dog’s Guide to Tokyo. Photographs by Eikoh Hosoe. New York: Norton, 1969.

=== Children's nonfiction ===
- Children of Vietnam, co-authored with Thomas C. Fox. New York: Atheneum, 1972. Finalist for the 1973 National Book Award for Young People's Literature.

=== Adult works ===
- —. Return to Hiroshima. Photographs by Eikoh Hosoe. New York: Atheneum, 1970.
- —. A Place Called Hiroshima. New York & London: Kodansha, 1985.
- —. Twice Born: Memoirs of an Adopted Daughter. New York: McGraw-Hill, 1975; London: Penguin, 1977.
- —. Lost and Found: The Adoption Experience. New York: Dial Press, 1979.
- —. The King of Children: A Biography of Janusz Korczak. New York: Farrar, Straus & Giroux; London: Chatto & Windus, 1988.
- —. Journey of the Adopted Self: A Quest for Wholeness. New York: BasicBooks, 1994.
