= Edward Hunter (journalist) =

American journalist (1902–1978)

Edward Hunter (July 2, 1902 – June 24, 1978) was an American writer, journalist, propagandist, and intelligence agent who was noted for his anticommunist writing. He was a recognized authority on psychological warfare. Both contemporary psychologists and later historians would criticize the accuracy and basis of his reports on brainwashing, but the concept nevertheless became influential in the Cold War-era United States.

== Early life ==
Hunter was born in New York on July 2, 1902.

== Journalism ==
Hunter began his career as a newspaperman and foreign correspondent for the old International News Service.

From 1926 to 1928, Hunter worked for the Hankow Herald newspaper in Hankou, China, and traveling in Japan and China during the Japanese invasion of Manchuria and its detachment from China. He reported on the Japanese invasion of Manchuria before spending five years in Spain covering the Spanish Civil War. He later covered the Second Italo-Abyssinian War between Italy and Ethiopia and took note of the psychological warfare methods used in all those instances as well as during the preparations by Germany for World War II.

He went on to work at newspapers and periodicals, including The Newark Ledger, The New Orleans Item, and in his home state, The New York Post, The New York American, Tactics, and Counterattack. He later worked in France at the Chicago Tribune's Paris edition. Hunter was also active in the Newspaper Guild, the journalists' trade union, which he felt was dominated by communist sympathizers.

He sat on the advisory board of Young Americans for Freedom. In January 1964 he began publication of the Tactics newsletter under the auspices of Anti-Communism Liaison, Inc. Hunter served as chairman of the organization and editor of the newsletter until 1978. He was also associated with the American Opinion Speakers' Bureau of the John Birch Society.

=== Critical reception ===
Historian Julia Lovell has criticized Hunter's reporting as "outlandish" and sensational. By 1956, US government psychologists largely concluded after examining files of Korean War POWs that brainwashing as described by Hunter did not exist, but the impact of his reporting was significant, and helped shaped public consciousness about the threat of Communism for decades. Lovell argues that Hunter created "an image of all-powerful Chinese 'brainwashing' ... [that] supposed an ideological unified Maoist front stretching from China to Korea and Malaya", but declassified US documents show a much more complicated and contested picture of Chinese influence and international aspirations in Asia.

== Intelligence work ==
Hunter provided testimony to Senator Keating stating that he joined the Office of Strategic Services (OSS) about the time of the attack on Pearl Harbor and served for the life of the organization.

After the war he "helped close up shop" and continued his intelligence work under various other agencies such as SSU, the Strategic Services Unit of the U.S. Army. When the CIA was organized in 1947, Hunter joined under journalistic cover.

=== Psychological warfare ===
Hunter is widely acknowledged as having coined the term brainwashing in a 1950 article for Miami News. He first used it publicly in an article for the Miami News on September 24, 1950. In this article and in later works, Hunter claimed that by combining Pavlovian theory with modern technology, Russian and Chinese psychologists had developed powerful techniques for manipulating the mind. It was Hunter's variation of the Chinese term "xinao", meaning "cleaning the brain." As author Dominic Streatfeild recounts, Hunter conceived the term after interviewing former Chinese prisoners who had been subjected to a "re-education" process. He applied it to the interrogation techniques the KGB used during purges to extract confessions from innocent prisoners, and from there, variations were conceived - mind control, mind alteration, behavior modification, and others.

A year later, Hunter's magnum opus Brain-Washing in Red China: The Calculated Destruction of Men's Minds was published, warning of a vast Maoist system of ideological "re-education." The new terminology found its way into the mainstream in The Manchurian Candidate novel and the movie of the same name in 1962.

=== Congressional testimony ===
In March 1958, Hunter testified before the US House of Representatives' House Committee on Un-American Activities. He described the US and NATO as losing the Cold War because of the communists' advantage in propaganda and psychological manipulation. He felt that the West lost the Korean War for being unwilling to use its advantage in atomic weapons. He saw no difference between the various communist countries and warned that both Yugoslavia and China were as bent on communist world domination as was the Soviet Union.

== Later life ==
He died in Arlington, Virginia on September 24, 1978.

== Works ==
=== Books ===
- Brain-Washing in Red China: The Calculated Destruction of Men's Minds. New York: Vanguard Press (1951).

Revised edition (1971).

- Brainwashing: The Story of Men Who Defied It. New York: Farrar, Straus & Cudahy (1956). Abstract at APA PsycNet.

Expanded edition published as Brainwashing: From Pavlov to Powers (1962).

- The Story of Mary Liu. New York: Farrar, Straus & Cudahy (1956); London: Hodder & Stoughton. LCCN 57-5919.
- The Black Book on Red China: The Continuing Revolt. New York: The Bookmailer (1958).
- The Past Present: A Year in Afghanistan. London: Hodder & Stoughton (1959).
- In Many Voices: Our Fabulous Foreign-Language Press. Norman Park, GA: Norman College (1960). "These pages present a cross-section of the foreign-language newspapers in the United States."
- Brainwashing: From Pavlov to Powers. New York: The Bookmailer (1962).

Expanded edition of Brainwashing: The Story of Men Who Defied It (1956).

- Attack by Mail. Linden, NJ: The Bookmailer (1966).

=== Articles ===
- "Heresy in Japan." The Nation (May 9, 1928), pp. 549–550.
- "Hate Made to Order." (Jul. 1937).
- "The France and Germany of Asia." Esquire (Apr. 1938), pp. 46–47, 181–184. Full issue.
- "Streamlined Atrocities." Coronet Magazine (Jun. 1938), pp. 3–8.
- "The Isms Are After Me." Harpers Monthly (Jul. 1938), pp. 218–220.
- "Enemies at Democracy's Table." Esquire, vol. 10, no. 4(59) (Oct. 1938), pp. 36–37, 143–145.
- "He Warned Us Against Japan." American Mercury (Dec. 1943), pp. 692–695.
- "Can We Make Use of Hirohito?" The Nation (Mar. 4, 1944), pp. 278–279.
- "Can We Make Use of the Japanese Emperor?" New Republic (Mar. 4, 1944), pp. 278–279.
- "'Brain-Washing' Tactics Force Chinese Into Ranks of Communist Party." Miami News (Sep. 24, 1950), p. 2A.
- "If I Were Mao Tse-Tung." American Mercury (Apr. 1952), pp. 39–48.
- "The Suicide of Recognizing Red China." American Mercury (May 1952), pp. 44–54.
- "Defeat by Default." American Mercury (Sep. 1952), pp. 40–51.
- "A Policy for Asia." American Mercury. (Dec. 1952), pp. 37–42.
- "Betrayal in Asia." American Mercury. (Jan. 1958), pp. 117–122.
- "The Indian Shell Game." American Mercury (Sep. 1958), pp. 29–35.
- "We're Asking for It in Panama." National Review (Mar. 14, 1959), pp. 583–584.
- "Murray Kempton: Unkempt." American Opinion, vol. 5, no. 10 (Nov. 1962), pp. 1–9.
- "McNamara as Sec. of Disarmament: U.S. Defense Secondary." Tactics, vol. 3, no. 5 (May 20, 1966). 8-page supplement. Full issue.
- "Why He Was Planted in Treasury: Sonnenfeldt Case Explained." Tactics, vol. 10, no. 11 (Nov. 20, 1973), pp. 8–9. JSTOR community.28147164.

=== Pamphlets ===
- The France and Germany of Asia (1938). Chicago: Esquire-Coronet, Inc.

=== Testimony ===
- Communist Psychological Warfare (Brainwashing): Consultation with Edward Hunter. Committee on Un-American Activities, House of Representatives, 85th Congress, 2nd session, March 13, 1958. (1958) Washington D.C.: Government Printing Office.
