= Daniel Romanovsky =

Israeli historian and researcher

Daniel Romanovsky (Hebrew: דניאל רומנובסקי; 1952 – 15 July 2024, Jerusalem) was an Israeli historian and researcher who has contributed to the study of the Holocaust in the Soviet Union under German occupation in World War II. Romanovsky was a Soviet refusenik politically active since the 1970s. Private seminars on the history of the Jews were held in his Leningrad apartment in the 1980s. Research on the topic was difficult in the Soviet Union because of government restrictions. In the 1970s and 1980s Romanovsky interviewed over 100 witnesses to the Holocaust, including Jews, Russians, and Belarusians, recording and cataloguing their accounts of the Final Solution.

== Biography ==
Daniel Romanovsky was born in Leningrad, Russia to an assimilated Jewish family. He graduated from the Leningrad State University. After his marriage and the birth of his first child he became interested in Jewish history, especially of the Holocaust. He made contact with other interested people and contributed to samizdat publications on the history of Soviet Jews. In 1988 he and his wife Elena moved to Israel, describing himself as a "computer programmer and historian." Since then he has contributed to many scholarly works on the Holocaust. He has also lectured to Russian, Byelorussian, Latvian, and Estonian educators under the auspices of Yad Vashem. He was a member of the Editorial and Abstracting staff at the Vidal Sassoon International Center for the Study of Antisemitism at Hebrew University of Jerusalem. He is presently tenured at The Avraham Harman Institute of Contemporary Jewry, Faculty of Humanities at The Hebrew University of Jerusalem. He has been described as among the ""leading scholars in the field," of studies of the interaction between the Holocaust and law.

== Views ==
Based on his interviews of Holocaust witnesses in Belarus, Romanovsky suggested that, although many people did help Jews escape, the collaboration with the Germans by most was partly a result of their experiences under the Soviet government. He invokes the concept of Homo Sovieticus, an ironic label for the "New Soviet man" who has adopted to the system. Jewish survivors mostly attributed people's reluctance to help to fear of the Germans, but also to antisemitism. He concluded that the open-type ghettos in Belarusian towns were the result of prior concentration of the entire Jewish communities in prescribed areas. No walls were required. He points out that people in Minsk, the capital of Belarus, were more likely to help Jews than those in rural areas. He says that this was partly from a greater feeling of separation from the Jews among rural people. He also reports what he calls the "Nazi brainwashing" of the people, which took place through both mass propaganda and intense re-education, especially in Belarusian schools. He notes that very soon most people had adopted the Nazi view of the Jews, that they were an inferior race and were closely tied to the Soviet government; views that had not been at all common before the occupation.

== Selected bibliography ==
- Romanovsky, Daniel (2009), "The Soviet Person as a Bystander of the Holocaust: The case of eastern Belorussia", in Bankier, David; Gutman, Israel (eds.), Nazi Europe and the Final Solution, Berghahn Books, p. 276, ISBN 978-1-84545-410-4
- Romanovsky, Daniel (1 March 1999). "The Holocaust in the Eyes of Homo Sovieticus: A Survey Based on Northeastern Belorussia and Northwestern Russia". Holocaust and Genocide Studies. 13 (3): 355–382. doi:10.1093/hgs/13.3.355.
- Romanovsky, Daniel (1997), "Soviet Jews Under Nazi Occupation in Northeastern Belarus and Western Russia", in Gitelman, Zvi (ed.), Bitter Legacy: Confronting the Holocaust in the USSR, Indiana University Press, p. 241, ISBN 0-253-33359-8
