= Cognitive immunization =

Rejecting information misaligned with one's beliefs

Cognitive immunization refers to the psychological process of rejecting information that is misaligned with one's existing beliefs. Instead of updating beliefs when presented with new information, those who exhibit cognitive immunization will instead preserve their assumptions about themselves and the world.

Cognitive immunization is primarily studied in clinical psychology, often in conjunction with major depressive disorder and generalized anxiety disorder.

== Clinical relevance ==
Aaron T. Beck, a pioneer in cognitive behavioural therapy, first theorized that depression is rooted in negative beliefs about oneself. Many cognitive theories, as a result, propose that biased negative beliefs are a mechanism that perpetuate depression.

Studies have since found that those with major depressive disorder, or similar disordered thinking patterns, are more likely to use cognitive immunization to disregard positive information in favor of maintaining their negative beliefs. This can result in ongoing negative beliefs about oneself and sustained depressive episodes.

The relationship between expectations of oneself and cognitive immunization have also been studied in the context of persisting mental disorders. It has been found that those with mental health disorders are more likely to use cognitive immunization to reject positive expectations of themselves than those without mental health disorders. This indicates that the inhibition of cognitive immunization is an important mechanism to target in therapeutic intervention.

In this context, Expectation-Focused Psychological Interventions (EFPI), or therapy that tests the credibility of a patient's expectations, can be an impactful tool for those who exhibit cognitive immunization. EFPI allows therapists and practitioners to test the beliefs of those with depression or anxiety and to potentially correct any instances of cognitive immunization.

== Mechanisms and cognitive models ==
Cognitive immunization is considered a maladaptive cognitive process that rejects or dismisses expectation-disconfirming information. This phenomenon can be related to the violEx model, which examines how individuals adjust their expectations in light of new evidence.

According to this model, when an individual rejects novel information in favor of maintaining outdated or biased beliefs, they are cognitively immunizing themselves against disconfirming information.

== See also ==
- Self-deception
