= Distancing language =

Phrasing technique which disassociates speaker from subject

Distancing language is phrasing used by a person to psychologically "distance" themselves from a statement. It is used in an effort to separate a particular topic, idea, discussion, or group from their own personal identity for the purpose of self-deception, deceiving others, or disunifying oneself from a team, among others. The use of distancing language is primarily subconscious as a means to disengage oneself from acts or ideas that conflict with their personal values, beliefs, and ideals, and is often used to identify if a person is lying. Conscious uses of distancing language are often euphemistic in nature in order to downplay or desensitize a loaded topic in an effort to separate the speaker from the subject at hand.

== Common practices of distancing language ==
=== Avoiding first-person pronouns ===
The use of first-person pronouns as a singular ("I", "me", "my", "myself"), and as a plural ("we", "us", "our", "ourselves") indicates a psychological closeness between the speaker and the topic of discussion. Omitting first-person pronouns suggests the absence of responsibility and identification with the ideas conveyed in the statement.

==== "You" as a third-person pronoun ====
In the English language, the pronoun "you" can be used as an appropriate use of distancing language in a universal context, where the statements are intended to be applied to anyone in the general public (e.g. the statement "You should never drink and drive" pertains to anyone who drives). Consequently, “you” is a common replacement for the first-person pronoun, often to hint at one's lack of commitment to or interest in a group or organization.

- When suggesting ways to increase traffic to an organization's information booth at a fair, a group member says, "You'll get the attention of more people if you play upbeat music." The alternative phrasing, "We'll get the attention of more people if we play upbeat music" suggests the speaker identifies with the organization, accepting the shared task of garnering attention to the organization's booth.

==== Passive voicing ====
The use of a passive voice allows for the omission of identity or ownership, since the nature of the passive voice is that an action is done to an object, and the action's agent is not necessary.

- A restaurant server tells a customer that "A mistake was made on your order" instead of "I made a mistake on your order" as a way of avoiding ownership.

=== “that” vs. "this" ===
Demonstrative determiners such as “that” and “those” illustrate a physical or psychological distance between the object and the speaker. The demonstratives “this” and “these” refer to an object that is close to the speaker.

- A business owner says, "I did not come up with those ideas", after his business proposal was rejected by investors.

=== Deflecting, minimizing, omission of detail ===
Avoiding straightforward statements is common in deception, either to another person or in self-deception, in order to avoid details that might signify ownership or personal knowledge of the topic. This is accomplished through statements that deflect the topic or that minimize the importance and impact of the topic; alternatively, the speaker can keep statements vague or use hedge words.

- When a man is asked about his ex-girlfriend's infidelity, he shrugs and says, "I guess I should've seen it coming. We were fighting all the time at that point anyway, so we were probably going to break up sooner rather than later."

=== Euphemisms ===
Euphemisms are used as a means of minimizing negative emotions that the statement may elicit (either from the speaker or others), in order to make the speaker appear unaffected and the situation impersonal.

- Military personnel may use a range of distancing terms for combatants either killing or getting killed. They may also employ distancing, dehumanizing terms for enemy combatants. "Collateral damage" for the incidental or accidental killing of non-combatants during attacks on legitimate military targets is an example.

== See also ==
- Political correctness
- Polite fiction
