= The Nazi Doctors =

1986 book by Robert Jay Lifton

The Nazi Doctors: Medical Killing and the Psychology of Genocide
- Author: Robert Jay Lifton
- Language: English
- Genre: Non-fiction
- Publication date: 1986
- Publication place: United States

The Nazi Doctors: Medical Killing and the Psychology of Genocide was written by Robert Jay Lifton and published in 1986 by Basic Books, analyzing the role of German doctors in carrying out a genocide. In the work Lifton details the medical procedures occurring before and during the Holocaust and explores the paradoxical theme of healing killing in which one race was healed by eliminating another; a concept that many used to morally justify their actions. Throughout the book, Lifton provides quotes from interviews he conducted with SS doctors and with victims.

The book was awarded the 1987 Los Angeles Times Book Prize and the 1987 National Jewish Book Award in the Holocaust category.

== Synopsis ==
The Nazi Doctors is divided into three parts. The first part describes in detail the four stages that took place before the Holocaust. It begins with coercive sterilization and progresses to the killing of children and then adults; with medical justifications used to legitimize the actions of Nazi doctors. The progression of the killings began legally through sterilization laws and evolved into illegal actions permitted by the government. This period under the rule of the Nazi Germany, saw widespread propaganda and indoctrination of the German population. The second part of the book covers the transportation of the victims to concentration camps, their arrival, daily life within the camp, and how different groups adjusted and evolved. The ideology driven by Adolf Hitler received significant support from doctors and Nazi officials, enabling the establishment of concentration camps where mass medical killings were carried out.

After the genocide was discovered, and the Holocaust was ended, people were left in disbelief as to how such actions of crime could have undergone and for so long. Part III of the book provides an analysis to the moral conflicts faced by the doctors and faces the reality of the genocide. Lifton explores the behavior individually and collectively of the doctors and discusses how the socialization to killing could have come about.

== Reception ==
The Nazi Doctors has been reviewed by JAMA, The Journal of Psychiatry and Law, and The Journal of Medicine and Philosophy.

Lifton received positive but mixed responses from scholars in both historiographical and psychological fields. Reviewers commonly praised the uniqueness of Lifton's work in bringing psychoanalysis to the study of the Holocaust. Psychoanalyst Dr. Arthur Hyatt Williams described the book as an important discussion of the ethical and psychological questions raised by medical participation in genocide. Trauma Studies scholar Cathy Caruth emphasized the significance of Lifton’s work for trauma studies, especially how Lifton's work intersects with trauma studies; particularly in its discussion of the idea of a true witness and a "false witness," which describe how an individuals processing, or lack thereof, of experiences of death and trauma can impact their future decisions.

Historians and medical professionals raised methodological and historiographical criticisms. Geoffrey Cocks questioned Lifton’s reliance on only a small number of interviews with Nazi physicians and survivors, arguing that the evidence gained from these interviews was insufficient for broad historical conclusions. Several critics critiqued Lifton’s proposed concept of “doubling,” which he used to describe how Nazi physicians separated their healing identity from their role in killing, a sort of Dr. Jekyll and Mr. Hyde situation in the eyes of Dr. Arthur Hyatt WIlliams. Charles G. Roland argues against the concept of "doubling" as a whole, strongly arguing that people can, and have, committed horrendous atrocities without the need for mental dissociation. Notable historian Fritz Stern wrote that Lifton too broadly applies the term "doubling" to Nazis in general, and that such a generalization can appear to humanize Nazis. Historian Hugh Murray further argued that Lifton’s description of Nazi scientific beliefs as pseudoscience ignored the fact that ideas such as eugenics and racial science were believed to be legitimate in the time of the Nazis. Despite these critiques, reviewers generally recognized Lifton’s book as a significant and unique contribution to discussions of genocide, psychology, and history.

== See also ==
- List of Nazi Doctors
