= Loaded language =

Rhetoric used to influence an audience

Loaded language (Note: Also known as loaded terms, strong emotive language, high-inference language, language-persuasive techniques, emotive language, and rhetorical language.) is rhetoric used to influence an audience by using words and phrases with strong connotations. This type of language is very often made vague to more effectively invoke an emotional response or exploit stereotypes. Loaded words and phrases have significant emotional implications and involve strongly positive or negative reactions beyond their literal meaning.

== Definition ==
Loaded terms, also known as emotive or ethical words, were clearly described by Charles Stevenson. He noticed that there are words that do not merely describe a possible state of affairs. Terrorist is not used only to refer to a person who commits specific actions with a specific intent. Words such as torture and freedom carry with them something more than a simple description of a concept or an action. They have a "magnetic" effect, an imperative force, a tendency to influence the interlocutor's decisions. They are strictly bound to moral values leading to value judgements and potentially triggering specific emotions. For this reason, they have an emotive dimension. In the modern psychological terminology, we can say that these terms carry "emotional valence", as they presuppose and generate a value judgement that can lead to an emotion.

The appeal to emotion is in contrast to an appeal to logic and reason. Authors R. Malcolm Murray and Nebojša Kujundžić distinguish "prima facie reasons" from "considered reasons" when discussing this. An emotion, elicited via emotive language, may form a prima facie reason for action, but further work is required before one can obtain a considered reason.

Emotive arguments and loaded language are particularly persuasive because they exploit the human weakness for acting immediately based upon an emotional response, without such further considered judgement. Due to such potential for emotional complication, it is generally advisable to avoid loaded language in argument or speech when fairness and impartiality is one of the goals. Anthony Weston, for example, admonishes students and writers: "In general, avoid language whose only function is to sway the emotions".

One aspect of loaded language is that loaded words and phrases occur in pairs, sometimes as political framing techniques by individuals with opposing agendas. Heller calls these "a Boo! version and a Hooray! version" to differentiate those with negative and positive emotional connotations. Examples include bureaucrat versus public servant, anti-abortion versus pro-life, regime versus government, and elitist versus expert.

== Examples ==
Politicians employ euphemisms, and study how to use them effectively: which words to use or avoid using to gain political advantage or disparage an opponent. Speechwriter and journalist Richard Heller gives the example that it is common for a politician to advocate "investment in public services," because it has a more favorable connotation than "public spending."

In the 1946 essay "Politics and the English Language", George Orwell discussed the use of loaded language in political discourse:

The word Fascism has now no meaning except in so far as it signifies "something not desirable." The words democracy, socialism, freedom, patriotic, realistic, justice have each of them several different meanings which cannot be reconciled with one another. In the case of a word like democracy, not only is there no agreed definition, but the attempt to make one is resisted from all sides. It is almost universally felt that when we call a country democratic we are praising it: consequently the defenders of every kind of regime claim that it is a democracy, and fear that they might have to stop using that word if it were tied down to any one meaning.

== See also ==
- Code word (figure of speech)
- Discourse
- Distancing language
- Dog-whistle (politics)
- If-by-whiskey
- Illocutionary act
- Intension
- Language of thought hypothesis
- Loaded question
- Markedness
- Neuro-linguistic programming
- Newspeak
- Obfuscation
- Parsing
- Persuasive definition
- Precising definition
- Propaganda
- Symbol (formal)
- Tabloid journalism
- Thick concept
- Thought-terminating cliché
- Truth-bearer
- Type–token distinction
- Variation (linguistics)
- Wooden language

== Citations ==
- Frijda, N.; Mesquita, B. (2000). Beliefs through emotions. In N. Frijda, A. Manstead, & S. Bem (Eds.), Emotions and beliefs: how feelings influence thoughts. Cambridge: Cambridge University Press. pp. 45–77.
- Heller, Richard (2002). High Impact Speeches. Pearson Education. p. 54. ISBN 978-0-273-66202-0.
- Macagno, Fabrizio; Walton, Douglas (2014). Emotive Language in Argumentation. New York: Cambridge University Press. ISBN 978-1-107-03598-0.
- Murray, Malcolm; Kujundzic, Nebojsa (2005). Critical Reflection. McGill Queen's University Press. p. 90. ISBN 978-0-7735-2880-2.
- Orwell, George (1946). "Politics and the English Language". Horizon. April. Archived from the original on 2012-01-30.
- Stevenson, Charles (1937). "The Emotive Meaning of Ethical Terms". Mind. 46: 14–31. doi:10.1093/mind/xlvi.181.14.
- Stevenson, Charles (July 1938). "Persuasive Definitions". Mind. 47 (187): 331–350. doi:10.1093/mind/xlvii.187.331.
- Stevenson, Charles (1944). Ethics and Language. Connecticut: Yale University Press.
- Weston, Anthony (2000). A Rulebook for Arguments. Hackett Publishing. p. 6. ISBN 978-0-87220-552-9.
