= Complications of prolonged standing =

The complications of prolonged standing are conditions that may arise after standing, walking, or running for prolonged periods. Many of the complications come from prolonged standing (more than 60% of a work day) that is repeated several times a week. Many jobs require prolonged standing, such as "retail staff, baristas, bartenders, assembly line workers, security staff, engineers, catering staff, library assistants, hair stylists and laboratory technicians". The basic physiological change that occurs in the body during prolonged standing or sudden stand from supine position is that there will be increased pooling of blood in the legs. This decreases the venous return, and so there will be decreased cardiac output, which ultimately causes systolic blood pressure to fall (hypotension). This hypotension may lead the subject to faint or to have other symptoms of hypotension. Standing requires about 10% more energy than sitting.

== Prevalence ==
European studies report that between one third and one half of all workers spend at least four hours of their work day standing or walking. One study from the United Kingdom estimated that over 11 million people stand for long periods of time without rest.

== Complications ==
=== Slouching ===
Prolonged periods of standing may lead to improper posture, particularly "slouching," which is the drooping or bending forward of the head, neck, and shoulders. Slouching puts immense pressure on the muscles and joints of the neck, shoulders, and lower back. This may lead to pain and stiffness in these areas, as well as headaches. Over time, slouching can affect breathing by compressing the lungs. It also increases pressure on the internal organs, potentially slowing digestion and leading to constipation.

=== Varicose veins ===
Varicose veins are veins that have become enlarged and twisted, especially within the legs, ankles and feet of an affected individual.

When standing, gravity pulls the blood downwards to the lower part of the body. Body mechanisms, such as vasoconstriction and valves of the veins, assist in pumping blood upwards. As blood is pumped through the body, the valves within the veins prevent the blood from flowing backwards. After extensive, prolonged standing, these valves can become weak and eventually fail. When this happens, blood is no longer being prevented from flowing backward. Gravity will pull the blood back into an individual's legs, ankles and feet. This forces the veins to expand or "balloon" to accommodate this extra blood.

The valves of the veins work best in concert with accompanying muscle contractions that force the blood to continue moving up the leg. Standing with some muscles constantly strained weakens these muscles and therefore the strength of the contractions. Varicose veins have also been associated with chronic heart and circulatory disorders and hypertension as well as complications related to pregnancy.

Prolonged standing increases the risk for hospitalization from varicose veins. Among the working age population one out of five hospitalizations from varicose veins are as a result of prolonged standing. Prolonged standing leads to impeded blood flow and stasis in the veins in the lower limbs, which can cause varicose veins.

=== Cardiovascular disorders ===
Standing for prolonged periods can lead to certain cardiovascular disorders. In a study by Krause et al. (2000) the authors examined the relationship between standing at work and the progression of carotid atherosclerosis in men. Standing for long periods can change the distribution of blood in the extremities. This in turn causes the blood to pool and reduces the circulating blood plasma volume leading to hemodynamic changes that impact the body. The authors reported that long periods of standing at work were significantly associated with atherosclerotic progression. This study provides evidence that hemodynamic changes from standing can influence the progressions of carotid atherosclerosis. The authors also found that men with carotid stenosis or ischemic heart disease were at greater risk for the progression of atherosclerosis . Atherosclerosis can lead to coronary artery disease, carotid artery stenosis, peripheral artery disease, and aneurysms.

=== Joint compression ===
Standing places significant pressure on the joint of the hips, knees, ankle and feet but without any significant movement of it. This reduces the normal lubrication and cushioning of synovial joints, causing them to tear. The combined effect of pressure and tearing can cause extensive amounts of pain and make it difficult to move or walk.

=== Muscle fatigue ===
Muscles kept in a constant stress position quickly become exhausted and can result in pain and swelling in the lower back, legs, ankles and feet.

The Occupational Safety and Health Administration (OSHA) has stated that muscle fatigue and musculoskeletal disorders account for "33% of all worker injury and illness". Considerable research has been conducted as to the extent of muscle injuries and all have concluded that these are expected but can be reduced with breaks and the availability of chairs.

Research has shown that the body experiences muscle fatigue after standing for five hours; this fatigue persists for more than 30 minutes after the end of the work day according to electronic measurements of fatigue. The perception of fatigue is subjective and does not necessarily correlate with the experimental indicators of fatigue.

== Pregnancy ==
Walking or standing more than six hours per day has been linked with pre-term births, low birth weights as well as high blood pressure for the mother.

Researchers have found that working more than 25 hours a week has been "associated with slower rates of fetal growth". They also found that, on average, there are no "negative effects of working up to 36 weeks into pregnancy".

== Productivity ==
A systematic review from Karakolis and Callaghan found that sit-stand workstations did not reduce worker productivity. Three of the reviewed studies found increased productivity when workers used sit stand stations, four reported no impact on the productivity of workers, and one reported mixed results.

== Intervention ==
There is no real prevention for standing, but there are ways to mitigate time spent standing in the workplace. Experts suggest to move around and change positions throughout the day. It is best not to sit in one position for more than 20 minutes, or to stand in one position for more than 8 minutes.

If prolonged sitting in the workplace is required or desired, individuals should gradually transition to significant periods of standing. When transitioning from sitting to standing, individuals might experience musculoskeletal discomfort or fatigue while the body adapts.

Companies should design workstations that are conducive to good health. Workstations should allow workers to choose between several working positions and to move easily between them. Additionally, workers should be able to adjust the height of their workstations to fit their body size. Other helpful aspects of workstations are footrests, elbow rests, and seats so workers can sit when they need to.

== Footwear ==
The choice of footwear can change the impact of prolonged standing. Shoes should support the foot, have shock-absorbing cushions, fit the foot well, and be comfortable. Shoes should not be flat, have heels higher than 5 cm, or change the shape of the foot. There are also special insoles for shoes that can be used when soft mats or chairs are not available. Additionally the floors in a work area should not be metal or concrete. It is best to have cork or rubber covered floors. Floors should not be slippery.

Training and education are important components of avoiding complications from standing. Employees trained in ergonomics experience less muscle discomfort and more productivity while using sit-stand work stations than workers not trained.

== Floor mats ==
Floor mat or anti-fatigue mats are used to prevent the complication associated with prolonged standing. A study by the University of Loughborough conducted by George Havenith and Lucy E. Dorman has shown "(dis)comfort sensations did show statistically significant improvements related to mat use." Proper floor mats can also be used to reduce stress on feet and knees. Anti-fatigue matting is recommended and launderable matting is preferred. A study investigating the effects of 4 different standing conditions on assembly workers showed that using mats and shoes with in-soles was perceived as more comfortable for the workers than without while standing on hard floors.

== See also ==
- Neutral spine
- Ergonomics
- Sitting - Health risks
