= Cocaine: An Unauthorized Biography =

2002 non-fiction book by Dominic Streatfeild

- Author: Dominic Streatfeild
- Published: 2002
- Publisher: Diane Publishing Company
- Publication place: United Kingdom
- Pages: 510 pp
- ISBN: 0-312-28624-4
- Preceded by: Silk Route by Rail (1997)

Cocaine: An Unauthorized Biography (ISBN 0312286244) is a 2002 non-fiction book about the history of cocaine, written by Dominic Streatfeild and published by Diane Publishing Company. The 2003 paperback edition (ISBN 0-312-42226-1) was published by Picador. The book investigates cocaine from the chewing of the coca leaf to the large-scale trafficking of cocaine into the United States.

Streatfeild goes into lucid detail about the history that the coca leaf had with the Native Americans and their Spanish overlords. He also investigates the life and impact of the world's most famous cocaine addict, Sigmund Freud. Written with sobering statistics and personal humor, Streatfeild travels to a number of locations, including to New York, indigenous areas of South America, and ultimately to Colombia to meet with the Ochoa family. Prior to his trip to Colombia, he is unable to obtain life insurance, and proceeds without it.

Within the book, the author interviews some of the most notorious figures directly involved in the distribution of cocaine including George Jung, whose life story was depicted in the 2001 film Blow, and "Freeway" Ricky Ross, the man attributed with the explosion of cocaine use in California in the 1980s.
