= Brainwashing =

Methods that purportedly control a person's will, desire, or knowledge

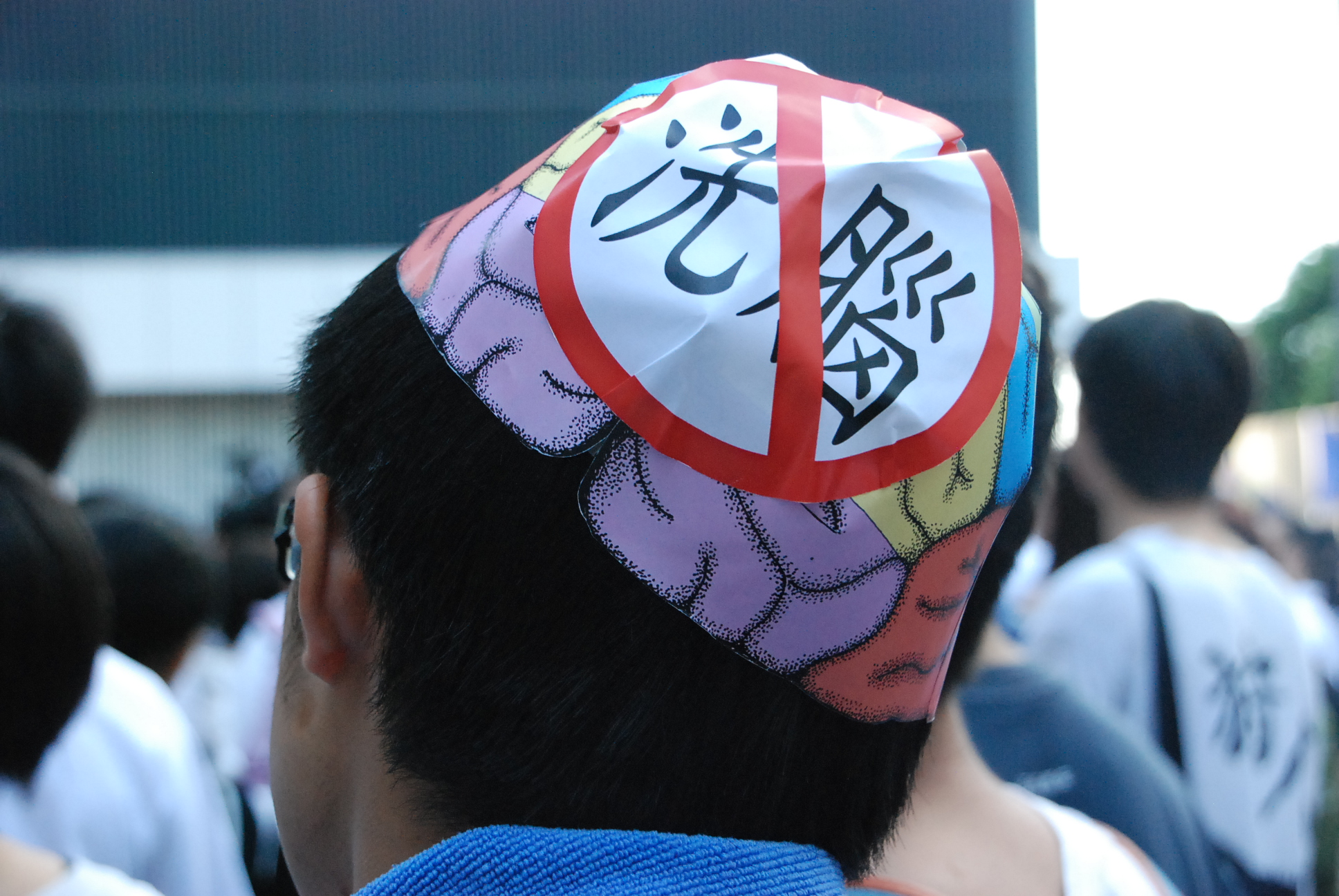
Protester in Hong Kong wearing headgear opposing "political brainwashing". The headgear contains the word "洗腦" (brainwashing) behind a prohibition symbol.

Brainwashing (Note: Also known as mind control, thought control, and forced re-education.) refers to the idea that an individual can get someone to adopt a particular doctrine or belief using purported methods that manipulate action or thought against a person's will, desire, or knowledge.

The term "brainwashing" was first used in English by Edward Hunter in 1950 to describe how the Chinese government appeared to make people cooperate with them during the Korean War. Theories of brainwashing and of mind control were originally developed to explain how totalitarian regimes appeared to systematically indoctrinate prisoners of war through propaganda and torture techniques. These theories were later expanded and modified by psychologists including Margaret Singer and Philip Zimbardo to explain a wider range of phenomena, especially conversions to some new religious movements (NRMs). The suggestion that NRMs use mind control techniques has resulted in scientific and legal debate; with scholars and legal experts rejecting the concept of brainwashing, finding it to be "without scientific merit".

Brainwashing has nonetheless become a common theme in popular culture especially in war stories, thrillers, and science fiction stories. In casual speech, "brainwashing" and its verb form, "brainwash", are used figuratively to describe the use of propaganda and advertising to sway public opinion.

== China and the Korean War ==
The Chinese term xǐnǎo (traditional Chinese: 洗腦; simplified Chinese: 洗脑 lit. 'wash brain') was originally used by early 20th century Chinese intellectuals to refer to "modernizing" one's way of thinking. The term was later used to describe the coercive persuasion used under the Maoist government in China, which aimed to transform "reactionary" people into "right-thinking" members of the new Chinese social system. The term punned on the Taoist custom of "cleansing/washing the heart/mind" (Chinese: 洗心; pinyin: xǐxīn) before conducting ceremonies or entering holy places. (Note: xīn can mean "heart", "mind", or "centre" depending on context. For example, xīn zàng bìng means Cardiovascular disease, but xīn lǐ yī shēng means psychologist, and shì zhōng xīn means Central business district.)

The Oxford English Dictionary records the earliest known English-language usage of brainwashing in an article by newspaperman Edward Hunter, in Miami News, published on 7 October 1950. Hunter, an outspoken anticommunist and said to be a CIA agent working undercover as a journalist, wrote a series of books and articles on the theme of Chinese brainwashing, and the word brainwashing quickly became a stock phrase in Cold War headlines. Hunter and others used the Chinese term to explain why, during the Korean War (1950–1953), some American prisoners of war (POWs) cooperated with their Chinese captors, and even in a few cases defected to their side. British radio operator Robert W. Ford and British army Colonel James Carne also claimed that the Chinese subjected them to brainwashing techniques during their imprisonment.

The U.S. military and government laid charges of brainwashing in an effort to undermine confessions made by POWs to war crimes, including biological warfare. After Chinese radio broadcasts claimed to quote Frank Schwable, Chief of Staff of the First Marine Air Wing admitting to participating in germ warfare, United Nations commander General Mark W. Clark asserted: "Whether these statements ever passed the lips of these unfortunate men is doubtful. If they did, however, too familiar are the mind-annihilating methods of these Communists in extorting whatever words they want ... The men themselves are not to blame, and they have my deepest sympathy for having been used in this abominable way."

Beginning in 1953, Robert Jay Lifton interviewed American servicemen who had been POWs during the Korean War as well as priests, students, and teachers who had been held in prison in China after 1951. In addition to interviews with 25 Americans and Europeans, Lifton interviewed 15 Chinese citizens who had fled after having been subjected to indoctrination in Chinese universities. (Lifton's 1961 book Thought Reform and the Psychology of Totalism: A Study of "Brainwashing" in China, was based on this research.) Lifton found that when the POWs returned to the United States their thinking soon returned to normal, contrary to the popular image of "brainwashing."

In 1956, after reexamining the concept of brainwashing following the Korean War, the U.S. Army published a report entitled Communist Interrogation, Indoctrination, and Exploitation of Prisoners of War, which called brainwashing a "popular misconception". The report concludes that "exhaustive research of several government agencies failed to reveal even one conclusively documented case of 'brainwashing' of an American prisoner of war in Korea."

== Legal cases and the "brainwashing defense" ==
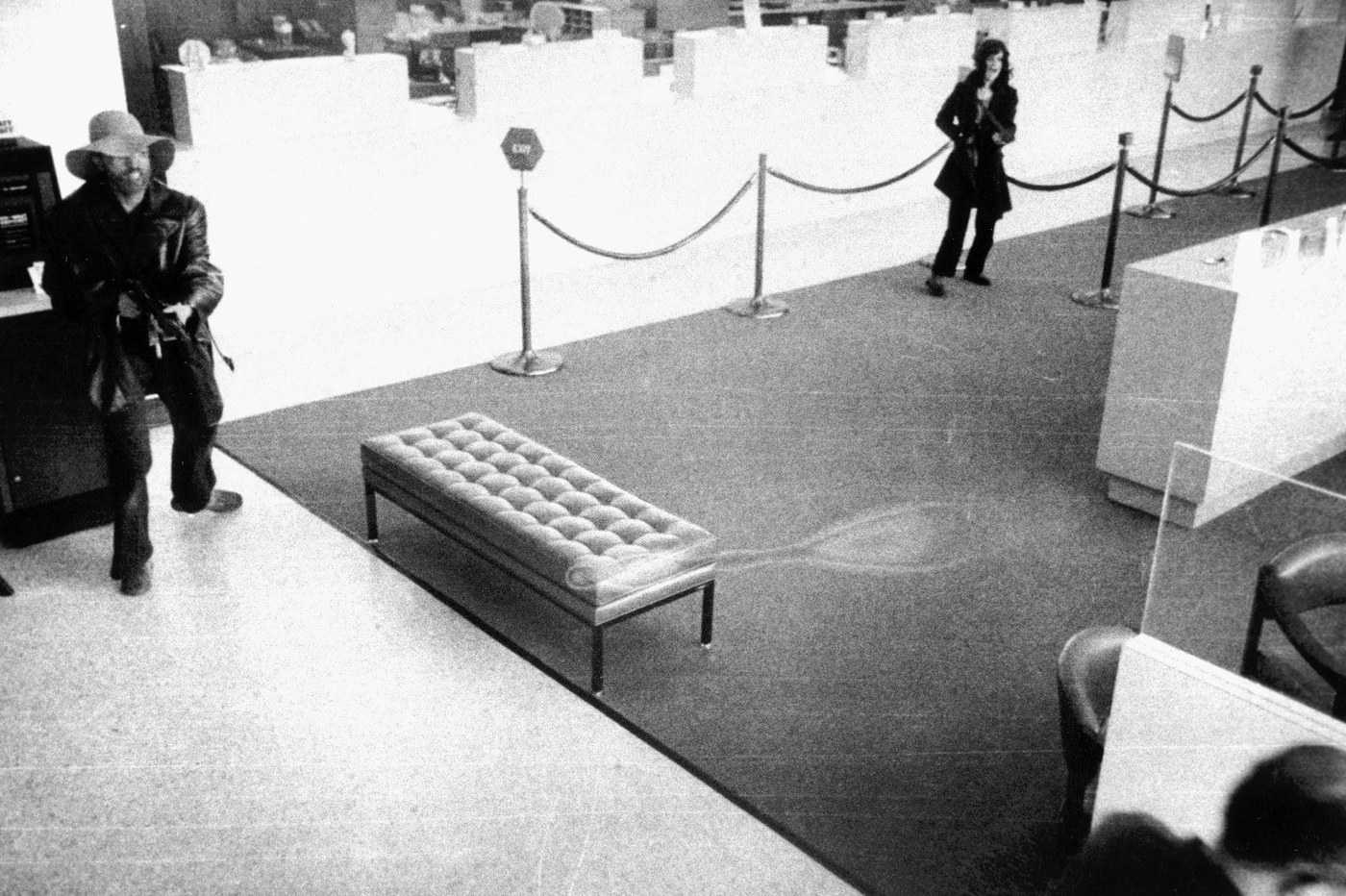
Bank robbery by Patty Hearst said to be brainwashed by the Symbionese Liberation Army.

The concept of brainwashing has been raised in defense of criminal charges. The 1969 to 1971 case of Charles Manson, who was said to have brainwashed his followers to commit murder and other crimes, brought the issue to renewed public attention.

In 1974, Patty Hearst, a member of the wealthy Hearst family, when 19 years old was kidnapped by the Symbionese Liberation Army, a left-wing militant organization. After several weeks of captivity, she agreed to join the group and took part in their activities. In 1975, she was arrested and charged with bank robbery and the use of a gun in committing a felony. Her attorney, F. Lee Bailey, argued in her trial that she should not be held responsible for her actions since her treatment by her captors was the equivalent of the alleged brainwashing of Korean War POWs (see also Diminished responsibility). Bailey developed his case in conjunction with psychiatrist Louis Jolyon West and psychologist Margaret Singer. They had both studied the experiences of Korean War POWs. (In 1996, Singer published her theories in her best-selling book Cults in Our Midst.) Despite this defense, Hearst was found guilty.

In 1990, Steven Fishman, who was a member of the Church of Scientology, was charged with mail fraud for conducting a scheme to sue large corporations via conspiring with minority stockholders in shareholder class action lawsuits. Fishman's attorneys notified the court that they intended to rely on an insanity defense, using the theories of brainwashing and the expert witnesses of Singer and Richard Ofshe to claim that the Church of Scientology had practiced brainwashing on him, which left him unsuitable to make independent decisions. The court ruled that the use of brainwashing theories is inadmissible in expert witnesses, citing the Frye standard, which states that scientific theories utilized by expert witnesses must be generally accepted in their respective fields. Since then, United States courts have consistently rejected testimony about mind control or brainwashing on the grounds that these theories are not part of accepted science under the Frye standard.

In 2003, the brainwashing defense was used unsuccessfully in defense of Lee Boyd Malvo, who was charged with murder for his part in the D.C. sniper attacks. Allegations of brainwashing have also been raised by plaintiffs in child custody cases.

Thomas Andrew Green, in his 2014 book Freedom and Criminal Responsibility in American Legal Thought, argues that the brainwashing defense undermines the law's fundamental premise of free will. In 2003, forensic psychologist Dick Anthony said that "no reasonable person would question that there are situations where people can be influenced against their best interests, but those arguments are evaluated based on fact, not bogus expert testimony."

== Anti-cult movement ==
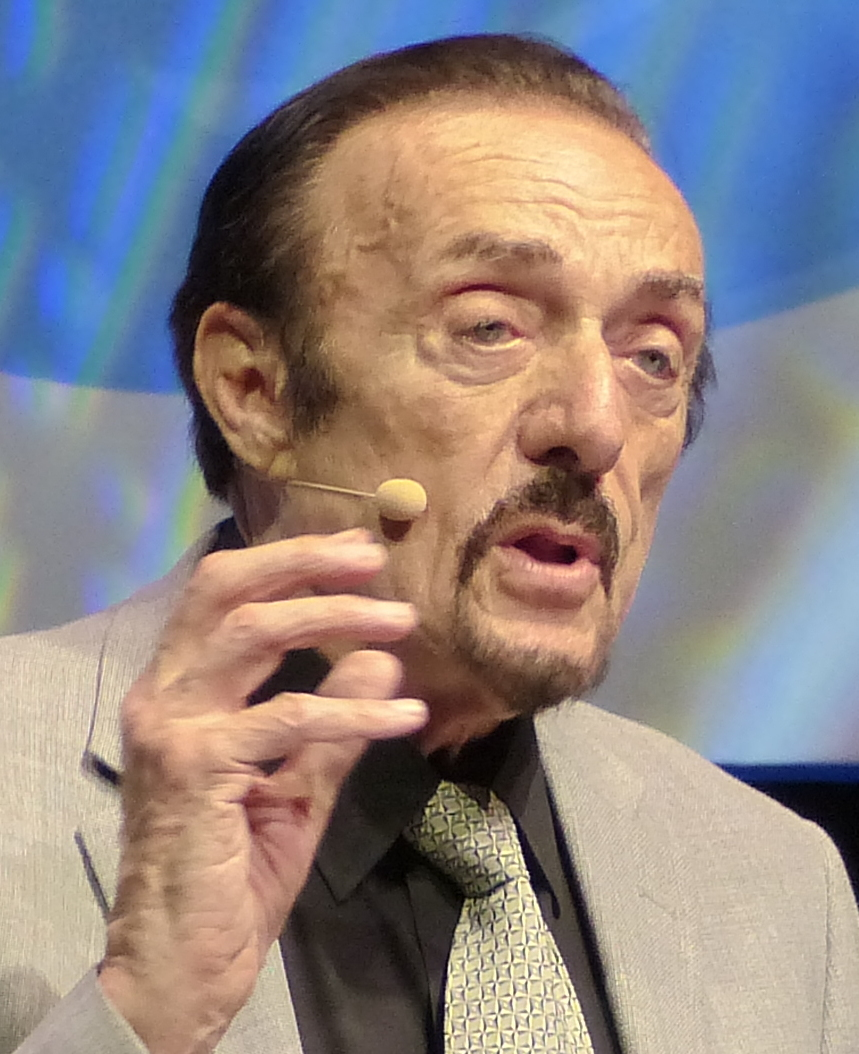
Philip Zimbardo, psychologist and professor at Stanford University.

In the 1970s and 1980s, the anti-cult movement applied the concept of brainwashing to explain religious conversions to some new religious movements (NRMs) and other groups that they considered cults. News media reports tended to accept their view and social scientists sympathetic to the anti-cult movement, who were usually psychologists, revised models of brainwashing. While some psychologists were receptive to the concept, most sociologists were skeptical of its ability to explain conversion. Some critics of the Latter Day Saint movement have accused it of brainwashing.

Philip Zimbardo defined mind control as "the process by which individual or collective freedom of choice and action is compromised by agents or agencies that modify or distort perception, motivation, affect, cognition or behavioral outcomes." He suggested that any person is susceptible to such manipulation.

Benjamin Zablocki, late professor of sociology at Rutgers University said that the number of people who attest to brainwashing in interviews (performed in accordance with guidelines of the National Institute of Mental Health and National Science Foundation) is too large to result from anything other than a genuine phenomenon. He said that in the two most prestigious journals dedicated to the sociology of religion there have been no articles "supporting the brainwashing perspective," while over one hundred such articles have been published in other journals "marginal to the field." He concluded that the concept of brainwashing had been blacklisted.

Eileen Barker criticized the concept of brainwashing because it functioned to justify costly interventions such as deprogramming or exit counseling. She has also criticized some mental health professionals, including Singer, for accepting expert witness jobs in court cases involving NRMs. Barker's 1984 book, The Making of a Moonie: Choice or Brainwashing?, describes the religious conversion process to the Unification Church (whose members are sometimes informally referred to as Moonies), which had been one of the best-known groups said to practice brainwashing. Barker spent close to seven years studying Unification Church members and wrote that she rejects the "brainwashing" theory because it does not explain why many people attended a recruitment meeting and did not become members nor why so many members voluntarily disaffiliate or leave groups.

James Richardson said that if the new religious movements had access to powerful brainwashing techniques, one would expect that they would have high growth rates, yet in fact, most have not had notable success in recruiting or retaining members. For this and other reasons, sociologists of religion including David Bromley and Anson Shupe consider the idea that "cults" are brainwashing American youth to be implausible.

Thomas Robbins, Massimo Introvigne, Lorne Dawson, Gordon Melton, Marc Galanter, and Saul V. Levine, amongst other scholars researching NRMs, have argued and established to the satisfaction of courts, relevant professional associations and scientific communities that there exists no generally accepted scientific theory, based upon methodologically sound research, that supports the concept of brainwashing.

In 1999, forensic psychologist Dick Anthony criticized another adherent to this view, Jean-Marie Abgrall, for allegedly employing a pseudoscientific approach and lacking any evidence that anyone's worldview was substantially changed by these coercive methods. He claimed that the concept and the fear surrounding it was used as a tool for the anti-cult movement to rationalize the persecution of minority religious groups. Additionally, Anthony, in the book Misunderstanding Cults, argues that the term "brainwashing" has such sensationalist connotations that its use is detrimental to any further scientific inquiry.

In 2016, Israeli anthropologist of religion and fellow at the Van Leer Jerusalem Institute Adam Klin-Oron said about then proposed "anti-cult" legislation:

In the 1980s there was a wave of 'brainwashing' claims, and then parliaments around the world examined the issue, courts around the world examined the issue, and reached a clear ruling: That there is no such thing as cults…that the people making these claims are often not experts on the issue. And in the end courts, including in Israel, rejected expert witnesses who claimed there is "brainwashing."

== United States scientific research ==
1977 United States Senate report on Project MKUltra, the Central Intelligence Agency's program of research into brainwashing

For 20 years, starting in the early 1950s, the Central Intelligence Agency (CIA) and the U.S. Department of Defense conducted secret research, including Project MKUltra, in an attempt to develop practical brainwashing techniques. These experiments ranged "from electroshock therapy to high doses of LSD".

The director Sidney Gottlieb and his team were apparently able to "blast away the existing mind" of a human being by using torture techniques; however, reprogramming, in terms of finding "a way to insert a new mind into that resulting void", was not so successful.

Controversial psychiatrist Colin A. Ross claims that the CIA was successful in creating programmable so-called "Manchurian Candidates" even at the time. The CIA experiments using various psychedelic drugs such as LSD and Mescaline drew from previous Nazi human experimentation.

In 1979, John D. Marks wrote in his book The Search for the Manchurian Candidate that until the MKUltra program was effectively terminated in 1963, the agency's researchers had found no reliable way to brainwash another person, as all experiments at some stage always ended in either amnesia or catatonia, making any operational use impossible.

A bipartisan Senate Armed Services Committee report, released in part in December 2008 and in full in April 2009, reported that U.S. military trainers who came to Guantánamo Bay in December 2002 had based an interrogation class on a chart copied from a 1957 Air Force study of "Chinese Communist" brainwashing techniques used to elicit false confessions from American POWs during the Korean War. The report showed how the Secretary of Defense's 2002 authorization of the aggressive techniques at Guantánamo led to their use in Afghanistan and in Iraq, including at Abu Ghraib.

=== American Psychological Association ===
In 1983, the American Psychological Association (APA) asked Singer to chair a taskforce called the APA Task Force on Deceptive and Indirect Techniques of Persuasion and Control (DIMPAC) to investigate whether brainwashing or "coercive persuasion" did indeed play a role in recruitment by cult movements. The task force concluded that:

Cults and large group awareness trainings have generated considerable controversy because of their widespread use of deceptive and indirect techniques of persuasion and control. These techniques can compromise individual freedom, and their use has resulted in serious harm to thousands of individuals and families.

Margaret Singer, who also spent time studying the political brainwashing of Korean prisoners of war, in her book Cults in Our Midst, describes six conditions which would create an atmosphere in which thought reform is possible.

1. Keep the person unaware of what is going on and how she or he is being changed a step at a time.
2. Control the person’s social and/or physical environment; especially control the person’s time.
3. Systematically create a sense of powerlessness in the person.
4. Manipulate a system of rewards, punishments and experiences in such a way as to inhibit behavior that reflects the person’s former social identity.
5. Manipulate a system of rewards, punishments, and experiences in order to promote learning the group’s ideology or belief system and group-approved behaviors.
6. Put forth a closed system of logic and an authoritarian structure that permits no feedback and refuses to be modified except by leadership approval or executive order.

Before the taskforce had submitted its final report, the APA submitted on 10 February 1987 an amicus curiæ brief in an ongoing court case related to brainwashing. Although the amicus curiæ brief written by the APA denies the credibility of the brainwashing theory, the APA submitted the brief under "intense pressure by a consortium of pro-religion scholars (a.k.a. NRM scholars)". The brief repudiated Singer's theories on "coercive persuasion" and suggested that brainwashing theories were without empirical proof. Afterward the APA filed a motion to withdraw its signature from the brief, since Singer's final report had not been completed.

On 11 May 1987, the APA's Board of Social and Ethical Responsibility for Psychology (BSERP) rejected the DIMPAC report because the report "lacks the scientific rigor and evenhanded critical approach necessary for APA imprimatur", and concluded that "after much consideration, BSERP does not believe that we have sufficient information available to guide us in taking a position on this issue." Benjamin Zablocki and Alberto Amitrani interpreted the APA's response as meaning that there was no unanimous decision on the issue either way, suggesting also that Singer retained the respect of the psychological community after the incident.

Two critical letters from external reviewers Benjamin Beit-Hallahmi and Jeffery D. Fisher accompanied the rejection memo. The letters criticized "brainwashing" as an unrecognized theoretical concept and Singer's reasoning as so flawed that it was "almost ridiculous." After her findings were rejected, Singer sued the APA in 1992 for "defamation, frauds, aiding and abetting and conspiracy" and lost. After that time U.S. courts consistently rejected testimonies about mind control and manipulation, stating that such theories were not part of accepted mainline science according to the Frye Standard of 1923.

== Other areas and studies ==
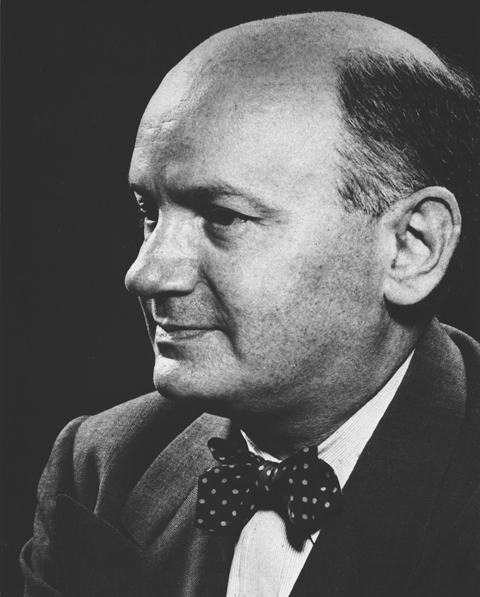
Joost Meerloo

Joost Meerloo, a Dutch psychiatrist, was an early proponent of the concept of brainwashing. "Menticide" is a neologism he coined meaning "killing of the mind". Meerloo's view was influenced by his experiences during the German occupation of his country during the Second World War and his work with the Dutch government and the American military in the interrogation of accused Nazi war criminals. He later emigrated to the United States and taught at Columbia University. His best-selling 1956 book, The Rape of the Mind, concludes by saying:

The modern techniques of brainwashing and menticide—those perversions of psychology—can bring almost any man into submission and surrender. Many of the victims of thought control, brainwashing, and menticide that we have talked about were strong men whose minds and wills were broken and degraded. But although the totalitarians use their knowledge of the mind for vicious and unscrupulous purposes, our democratic society can and must use its knowledge to help man to grow, to guard his freedom, and to understand himself.

Russian historian Daniel Romanovsky, who interviewed survivors and eyewitnesses in the 1970s, reported on what he called "Nazi brainwashing" of the people of Belarus by the occupying Germans during the Second World War, which took place through both mass propaganda and intense re-education, especially in schools. Romanovsky noted that very soon, most people had adopted the Nazi view that the Jews were an inferior race and were closely tied to the Soviet government, views that had not been at all common before the German occupation.

Italy has had controversy over the concept of plagio, a crime consisting in an absolute psychological—and eventually physical—domination of a person. The effect is said to be the annihilation of the subject's freedom and self-determination and the consequent negation of his or her personality. The crime of plagio has rarely been prosecuted in Italy, and only one person was ever convicted. In 1981, an Italian court found that the concept is imprecise, lacks coherence and is liable to arbitrary application.

Recent scientific book publications in the field of the mental disorder dissociative identity disorder (DID) mention torture-based brainwashing by criminal networks and malevolent actors as a deliberate means to create multiple "programmable" personalities in a person to exploit this individual for sexual and financial reasons. Earlier scientific debates in the 1980s and 1990s about torture-based ritual abuse in cults was known as "satanic ritual abuse," which was mainly viewed as a "moral panic."

Brain-Washing: A Synthesis of the Russian Textbook on Psychopolitics published by the Church of Scientology in 1955 about brainwashing. L. Ron Hubbard authored the text and alleged it was the secret manual written by Lavrentiy Beria, the Soviet secret police chief, in 1936. When the FBI ignored him, Hubbard wrote again stating that Soviet agents had, on three occasions, attempted to hire him to work against the United States, and were upset about his refusal, and that one agent specifically attacked him using as an electroshock weapon.

Kathleen Barry, co-founder of the United Nations NGO, the Coalition Against Trafficking in Women (CATW), prompted international awareness of human sex trafficking in her 1979 book Female Sexual Slavery. In his 1986 book Woman Abuse: Facts Replacing Myths, Lewis Okun reported that: "Kathleen Barry shows in Female Sexual Slavery that forced female prostitution involves coercive control practices very similar to thought reform." In their 1996 book, Casting Stones: Prostitution and Liberation in Asia and the United States, Rita Nakashima Brock and Susan Brooks Thistlethwaite report that the methods commonly used by pimps to control their victims "closely resemble the brainwashing techniques of terrorists and paranoid cults."

In his 2000 book, Destroying the World to Save It: Aum Shinrikyo, Apocalyptic Violence, and the New Global Terrorism, Robert Lifton applied his original ideas about thought reform to Aum Shinrikyo and the war on terrorism, concluding that, in this context, thought reform was possible without violence or physical coercion. He also pointed out that in their efforts against terrorism, Western governments were also using some alleged mind control techniques.

In her 2004 popular science book, Brainwashing: The Science of Thought Control, neuroscientist and physiologist Kathleen Taylor reviewed the history of mind control theories, as well as notable incidents. In it, she theorized that persons under the influence of brainwashing may have more rigid neurological pathways, and that can make it more difficult to rethink situations or to be able to later reorganize these pathways.

In 2006 Brainwash: The Secret History of Mind Control is a non-fiction book about the evolution of brainwashing from its origins in the Cold War through to today's war on terror. The author, Dominic Streatfeild, uses formerly classified documentation and interviews from the CIA. Non-suggestive interviews of Sirhan Sirhan over eleven years by psychologist Daniel Brown provided evidence of Sirhan's preparation as a "Manchurian Candidate" for the 1968 assassination of Senator Robert Kennedy.

== In popular culture ==
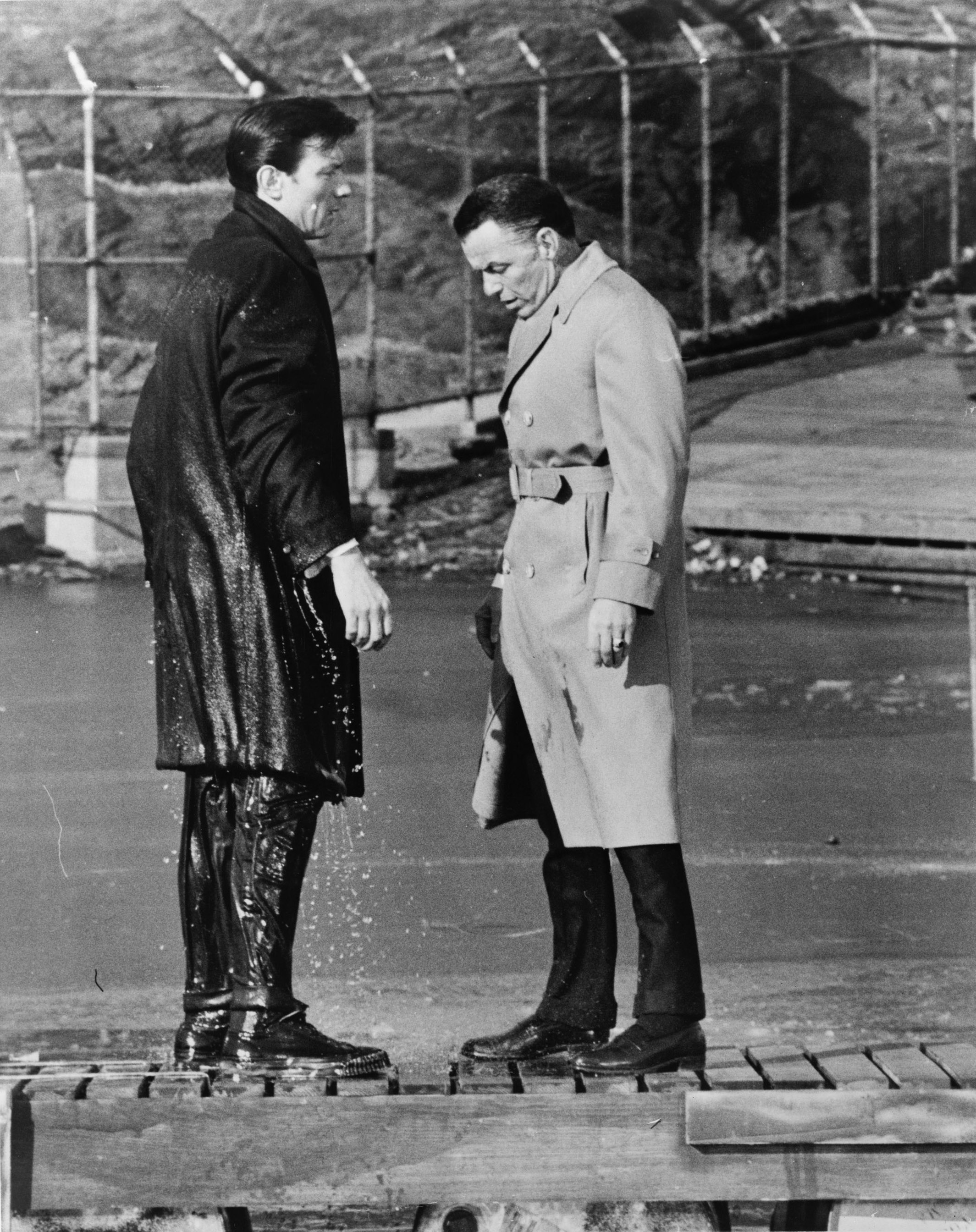
Laurence Harvey and Frank Sinatra in The Manchurian Candidate

In George Orwell's 1949 dystopian novel Nineteen Eighty-Four, the main character is subjected to imprisonment, isolation, and torture to conform his thoughts and emotions to the wishes of the rulers of the book's fictional future totalitarian society. The torturer representing the authorities says, "We make the brain perfect before we blow it out...Everyone is washed clean." Orwell's vision influenced Hunter and is still reflected in the popular concept of brainwashing.

In the 1950s, some American films were made that featured brainwashing of POWs, including The Rack, The Bamboo Prison, Toward the Unknown, and The Fearmakers. In 1956, Forbidden Area told the story of Soviet secret agents who had been brainwashed through classical conditioning by their own government so they wouldn't reveal their identities. In 1962, The Manchurian Candidate (based on the 1959 novel by Richard Condon) "put brainwashing front and center" by featuring a plot by the Soviet government to take over the United States by using a brainwashed sleeper agent for political assassination.

The concept of brainwashing became popularly associated with the research of Russian psychologist Ivan Pavlov, which mostly involved dogs as subjects. In The Manchurian Candidate the head brainwasher is "Dr. Yen Lo, of the Pavlov Institute."

The science fiction stories of Cordwainer Smith (pen name of Paul Myron Anthony Linebarger (1913–1966), a U.S. Army officer who specialized in military intelligence and psychological warfare during the Second World War and the Korean War) depict brainwashing to remove memories of traumatic events as a normal and benign part of future medical practice.

Brainwashing remains an important theme in science fiction. A subgenre is corporate mind control, in which a future society is run by one or more business corporations that dominate society, using advertising and mass media to control the population's thoughts and feelings. Terry O'Brien commented: "Mind control is such a powerful image that if hypnotism did not exist, then something similar would have to have been invented: The plot device is too useful for any writer to ignore. The fear of mind control is equally as powerful an image."

== See also ==
- Behavior modification
- Coercion
- Deprogramming
- Hypnosis
- Indoctrination
- Manipulation (psychology)
- Mind control in popular culture
- Orwellian
- Psychological warfare
- The Brainwashing of My Dad
- Thought Reform and the Psychology of Totalism
- Unethical human experimentation in the United States
