= Soma (Brave New World) =

Fictional drug

Soma is a fictional drug in Aldous Huxley's 1932 dystopian sci-fi novel Brave New World. In the novel, soma is an "opiate of the masses" that replaces religion and alcohol in a peaceful, but amoral, high-tech society far in the future. Soma, a narcotic tranquilizer in tablet and vapor form, is regularly taken by all members of society in order to produce feelings of euphoric happiness. Soma, however, is harmful or even deadly when taken in large amounts. In Brave New World, Linda died after consuming too much soma. Inspired by Huxley's trip to India in the mid-1920s, soma is based on the historical soma drink, used in Hindu rituals to induce a hallucinogenic state. Besides soma, Huxley also incorporated other ideas based on Indian culture into the book, such as the caste system used in the fictional society of the World-State.

The idea of soma has become well known in popular culture, and it has been compared to later real-life drugs like Valium. The name has become representative of modern society's dependence on prescription drugs.

== Overview ==
Huxley had visited India from 1925 to 1926 while it was under the control of the British Raj and wracked by division. He described India as "depressing as no country I have ever known" and was glad to leave it, being critical of British rule over the country, but not believing they could rule themselves better, and ultimately describing it as a hopeless situation. However, he was nevertheless inspired by its cultural elements while writing the book. In Brave New World Revisited, Huxley states that he based soma not on the Greek word but on the Vedic "nectar of the gods", a liquid necessary for certain rituals and identified in 1969 to have been created from pressed juice from the fly agaric hallucinogenic mushroom. Numerous hymns and references to the real-life soma exist in the Rigveda, where it is worshiped as a deity second only to Indra in power. Similar to the actual soma, takers of the fictional soma are emotionally strengthened, but face considerable danger.

In Brave New World, the fictional soma was the product of six years of research by thousands of pharmacologists and biochemists, who sought to create the ideal intoxicant. It functions similarly to alcohol, but without the defects. The Controllers of the World-State encourage the use of soma for the benefit of the state, reducing unrest and subversive ideas by ensuring people are happy, and thereby preventing war. Rather than religion, the people of the World-State worship soma. The "savages" in the book, people who live outside the World-State generally do not rely on soma for happiness, instead, they drink a liquid called mescal which produces similar effects.

In 1954, Huxley compared soma to mescaline in the book The Doors of Perception, citing its psychedelic effects. However, people are too susceptible to subtle influences while taking mescaline for it to truly be similar to soma.

== Reception ==
In The Tranquilizing of America (1979), Robert Hoffman compared Soma to Valium, citing America's increasing reliance on prescription medication.

== Legacy ==
Soma is mentioned in later works, such as the 1993 album Siamese Dream by The Smashing Pumpkins, whose song "Soma" call it "the opiate of blame". The Strokes released a song called "Soma" on their 2001 album Is This It, containing less subtle references. The muscle-relaxant drug Carisoprodol is sold under the trade name Soma.

== See also ==
- Melange, fictional drug from the 1965 novel Dune by Frank Herbert
