= Dominic Streatfeild =

Author, freelance journalist and documentary maker

Dominic Streatfeild is an author, freelance journalist and documentary maker based in the UK who specialises in military and security issues.

== Documentary work ==
Streatfeild's television work includes BBC2's Exocet detailing MI6 and the SAS's clandestine war for the Falkland Islands and exposing the real reasons for the loss of HMS Sheffield, the Discovery Channel's series Age of Terror, examining the roots of political violence and a 2010 documentary for the Discovery Channel Rescued: The Chilean Mine Story, detailing the attempts to rescue 33 Chilean miners trapped in the mine near Copiapó in northern Chile.

== Background ==
Streatfeild studied at King's College London, has served in the British Armed Forces, worked for the BBC and as an independent documentary maker and journalist.

His first book Silk Route by Rail (ISBN 1873756143, Trailblazer Publications, 1997) took Streatfeild a year to write and in its second edition was short-listed for the Thomas Cook Travel Book Award.

Streafeild's second book Cocaine: An Unauthorised Biography (ISBN 9780753506271, Virgin Books, 2002) described the fascinating and disturbing rise of cocaine from the chewing of coca leaves by the South American peoples to the illegal trade in cocaine today. The life of George Jung, one of the more colourful characters in the book, was dramatised in the film Blow starring Johnny Depp.

Brainwash: The Secret History of Mind Control (ISBN 0340831618, Hodder & Stoughton, 2006) is Streatfeild's third book and was nominated for the Samuel Johnson Award in 2007. Inspired by John Mark's 1979 book The Search for the Manchurian Candidate, Streatfeild investigated the reality of brainwashing. The book is currently recommended as part of The Intelligence Officer's Bookshelf by the CIA.

Streatfeild's latest book, A History of the World since 9/11 (ISBN 9781843547662, Atlantic Books, 2011), published in February 2011, explores through a series of interlinked chapters detailing how people across the globe have been affected by the US response to the attacks on the Twin Towers in September 2001. A chapter from the book Stuff Happens was published in the Guardian Newspaper in January 2011 detailing the failure of US Forces to secure the explosives from the weapons store at Al Qa'qaa.

== Bibliography ==
- A History of the World since 9/11 (2011)
- Brainwash: The Secret History of Mind Control (2006)
- Cocaine: An Unauthorized Biography (2002)
- Silk Route by Rail (1997)
