= Kathleen Taylor (biologist) =

British biologist

Kathleen E. Taylor
- Education: University of Oxford; Stirling University
- Awards: First prize, THES/OUP Science Essay competition and THES Humanities and Social Sciences Writing Prize
- Scientific career
- Fields: Neuropsychology, Physiology, Psychology
- Workplaces: University of Oxford, Department of Physiology, Anatomy and Genetics
- Thesis: Computational modelling of the contribution of posterior parietal cortex to saccadic eye movements. (1999)

Kathleen E. Taylor is a popular science author and was formerly a research scientist in the Department of Physiology, Anatomy and Genetics at the University of Oxford. She is now an honorary Fellow of the College of Arts and Law at the University of Birmingham, UK.

== Education ==
Taylor attended the University of Oxford where she studied physiology and philosophy. She obtained a master's degree in psychology from Stirling University, and received her doctorate in computational neuroscience from the University of Oxford.

== Research ==
Taylor did postdoctoral research in the areas of neuroimmunology and cognitive neuroscience, focusing on the neurodevelopmental condition dyslexia. She has also worked in the areas of social psychology and the neuroscience of belief.

== Published work ==
In 2003 Taylor won first prize in both the THES/OUP Science Essay competition and the THES Humanities and Social Sciences Writing Prize.

Brainwashing: The Science of Thought Control (2004), her first book, was "highly commended" and runner-up in the 2005 Times Higher Education Supplement Young Academic Author Award, and also made it to the shortlist for the 2005 MIND "Book of the Year Award". The book also made it to the longlist of the 2005 Aventis "Science Book Prize", where it was described as containing "elegant and accessible prose".

Cruelty: Human evil and the human brain (2009) examined human cruelty, from the points of view of biology and sociology.

The Brain Supremacy (2012) used recent examples from scientific literature and the media to explore how techniques such as fMRI function and how they could apparently be useful for thought identification. The book gives an overview of the latest advances in neuroscience while also looking at the practical and ethical side of new technologies. Taylor peers into the future and looks at how all the advances in neuroscience in its social and ethical context could possibly affect human behavior and impact peoples' daily lives.

The Fragile Brain (2016) explains dementia, what is known about its causes, its effects on victims, their families, and society, and ongoing research looking for effective treatment and prevention.

Dementia: a Very Short Introduction (2020), part of OUP's VSI series, is an overview of the science, treatment and prevention of dementia.
