= Chaim F. Shatan =

Polish-born Jewish-Canadian psychiatrist

Chaim F. Shatan (September 1, 1924 – August 17, 2001) was a Jewish-Canadian psychiatrist born in Włocławek, Poland.

Shatan's parents moved to Canada when he was two. He received his MDCM degree from McGill University in Montreal, Quebec, Canada. In 1949, he moved to New York City and founded a private practice in psychiatry in the early 1950s. He came from a Yiddish-speaking family; his mother's first language was Yiddish. Shatan was ethnically Jewish and not religiously observant.

Shatan had a longtime interest in war and trauma and became deeply involved with Vietnam veterans in the late 1960s, responding to an invitation by one of the founders of Vietnam Veterans Against the War, Jan Crumb (later known as Jan Barry), to form "rap groups" for veterans to speak about their emerging reactions. His article "Post-Vietnam Syndrome" was printed on the Op-Ed page of The New York Times on May 6, 1972. He continued to advocate for Vietnam veterans and other victims of war, trauma and natural and manmade disasters. In 1974, Shatan found out that "gross stress reaction", previously used to diagnose post-traumatic syndromes, had been eliminated from the Diagnostic and Statistical Manual of Mental Disorders (DSM), which is used to delineate psychological disorders. He founded the Vietnam Veterans Working Group with several colleagues, including Robert Jay Lifton, Sarah Haley, Jack Smith and Arthur Egendorf. They relentlessly pursued the issue, and reached out to Mardi J. Horowitz, the pioneer of experimental research in traumatic stress response, Harley Shands, Chief of Psychiatry at Roosevelt Hospital, who was working on workers' compensation cases, and William G. Niederland, who had initiated the study of reactions in concentration camp survivors with Henry Krystal. The group was successful in returning the diagnosis to the next edition of the book, DSM-III, under the new name "post-traumatic stress disorder", a term which evolved from discussions between Shatan and the Working Group with Nancy Andreasen.

Shatan's work foregrounded the concept that would later be termed vicarious trauma; in a 1973 article he wrote: “[Mental health professionals] should be forewarned . . . We, too, may have nightmares; we, too, may be unable to sleep, unable to talk normally to other people for days or weeks. Once we professionals admit the knowledge of the veterans into our awareness, we are changed in fundamental ways.” This concept was further explored and refined by clinical psychologists Karen Saakvitne and Laurie Anne Pearlman, who wrote about the transfer of trauma to those treating survivors of incest from their patients.

Shatan was also a founding member of the Society for Traumatic Stress Studies, now called the International Society for Traumatic Stress Studies.
