= Robert Jay Lifton =

American psychiatrist and author (1926–2025)

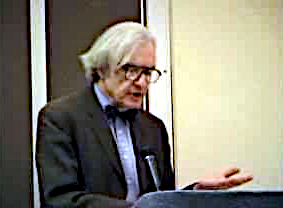
- Lifton in 2000
- Born: May 16, 1926; New York City, U.S.
- Died: September 4, 2025 (aged 99); Truro, Massachusetts, U.S.
- Education: Cornell University (BS); New York Medical College (MD)
- Known for: Thought Reform and the Psychology of Totalism; Death in Life: Survivors of Hiroshima; The Nazi Doctors: Medical Killing and the Psychology of Genocide
- Scientific career
- Fields: Psychiatry, psychohistory
- Workplaces: Washington School of Psychiatry; Harvard University; John Jay College of Criminal Justice; Yale University

Robert Jay Lifton (May 16, 1926 – September 4, 2025) was an American psychiatrist and author, chiefly known for his studies of the psychological causes and effects of wars and political violence, and for his theory of thought reform. He was an early proponent of the techniques of psychohistory.

== Early life and education ==
Robert Jay Lifton was born on May 16, 1926, in Brooklyn, New York, the son of businessman Harold A. Lifton, and Ciel Lifton née Roth. Both of his parents were Jewish immigrants from Eastern Europe. In 1942, he enrolled at Cornell University at the age of 16. He was admitted to New York Medical College in 1944, graduating in 1948. He interned at the Jewish Hospital of Brooklyn and did his psychiatric residence training at the Downstate Medical Center in Brooklyn from 1949 to 1951.

From 1951 to 1953, Lifton served as an Air Force psychiatrist in Japan and Korea, to which he later attributed his interest in war and politics. He subsequently worked as a teacher and researcher at the Washington School of Psychiatry, Harvard University, and the John Jay College of Criminal Justice, where he helped to found the Center for the Study of Human Violence.

He married the children's writer Betty Jean Kirschner in 1952, and they had two children. She died in Boston on November 19, 2010, from complications of pneumonia. From 2012 until his death, his partner was the political philosopher Nancy L. Rosenblum. Lifton said that cartooning was his avocation; he has published two books of humorous cartoons about birds.

Lifton was a member of Collegium International, an organization of leaders with political, scientific, and ethical expertise whose goal is to provide new approaches in overcoming the obstacles in the way of a peaceful, socially just and an economically sustainable world. In 2012, Lifton was awarded an honorary degree from The New School.

Lifton died in Truro, Massachusetts, on September 4, 2025, at the age of 99.

== Wellfleet Psychohistory Group ==
During the 1960s, Lifton, together with his mentor Erik Erikson and historian Bruce Mazlish of MIT, formed a group to apply psychology and psychoanalysis to the study of history. Meetings were held at Lifton's home in Wellfleet, Massachusetts. The Wellfleet Psychohistory Group, as it became known, focused mainly on psychological motivations for war, terrorism, and genocide in recent history. In 1965, they received sponsorship from the American Academy of Arts and Sciences to establish psychohistory as a separate field of study. A collection of research papers by the group was published in 1975: Explorations in Psychohistory: The Wellfleet Papers (see Bibliography; Lifton as editor). Lifton's work in this field was deeply influenced by Erikson's studies of Hitler and other political figures, as well as by Sigmund Freud's concern with the mass social effects of deep-seated drives, particularly attitudes toward death. The attendees include Erikson, Lifton, and Kenneth Keniston at the ‘continuous core’ of annual meetings, along with Bruce Mazlish, Norman Birnbaum, Alexander and Margaret Mitscherlich, Margaret Brennen, Peter Brooks, Robert Coles, Lloyd and Susanne Rudolph, Charles Strozier, Philip Rieff, Kai Erikson, Betty Jean Lifton, Norman Mailer, Howard Zinn, Frederick Wyatt, Noam Chomsky, Richard Sennett, Peter Gay, Ashis Nandy, Richard Goodwin, Harvey Cox, Frank Manuel, Leo Marx, Jonathan Schell, Raul Hilberg, Sudhir Kakar, David Dellinger, Dan Berrigan, Wendy Doniger, Cathy Caruth, David Riesman, Steve Marcus, Richard Barnet, Daniel Ellsberg, Richard Falk, Hillel Levine, Aaron Roland and many others until it closed shop in 2015.

== Studies of thought reform ==
Beginning in 1953, Lifton interviewed American servicemen who had been prisoners of war (POWs) during the Korean War, in addition to priests and students, or teachers who had been held in prison in China after 1951. In addition to interviews with 25 Americans and Europeans, Lifton interviewed 15 Chinese who had fled after having been subjected to indoctrination in Chinese universities.

Lifton's 1961 book, Thought Reform and the Psychology of Totalism: A Study of "Brainwashing" in China, based on this research, was a study of coercive techniques used in the People's Republic of China. He described this process as "thought reform" or "brainwashing", though he preferred the former term. The term "thought-terminating cliché" was popularized in this book. Lifton found that after the POWs returned to the United States, their thinking soon returned to normal, contrary to the popular image of "brainwashing" as resulting in permanent changes. A 1989 reprint edition was published by University of North Carolina Press.

== Eight criteria for thought reform ==
Lifton wrote the "Eight criteria for thought reform" that serves as a foundational psychological framework used to assess ideological totalism, coercive control, and "cultishness" within groups. They include;

1. Milieu control — when a group implement a significant degree of isolation from society at large. The group manipulates the external environment by controlling communication so that members only receive information that reinforces the group's "ultimate truth".
2. Mystical manipulation — The leader of the group makes claim of divine authority or spiritual advancement, including presenting themselves as a "chosen" human being or the only person that can promise salvation. The cult can orchestrate experiences that appear supernatural to make the leader or group look divinely inspired.
3. Demand for purity — Members are pressed to conform to the ideology of the group and strive for perfection, while guilt and shame are among powerful tools for controlling their behavior. The cult teaches a black-and-white doctrine where moral superiority is achieved through aligning with its teachings, while generally everything else is to be regarded as impure.
4. Cult of confession — when a group rids of confidentiality or privacy and a member's doubts, private thoughts or sins are discussed, and may be exploited by the leaders.
5. Sacred science — Group that present their claims as being absolute "scientific" truths, which can help such groups gain legitimacy in the modern age, including through claims to possess "special scientific knowledge of human behavior and psychology". Members are prohibited to question or criticize these assumptions. When the doctrine has a strong hold over followers' mental process, it can elicit guilt or fear when they consider ideas that contradict or disregard the group's doctrine, and thus hindering their pursuit of knowledge.
6. Loading the language — refers to a group's tendency to deify words and images, and oversimplify complex issues of one's life into simple slogans presented to representing the "truth as a totality".
7. Doctrine over person — a principle in which a group teaches members to regard its doctrine as the ultimate truth and to disregard or reject experiences that contradict it. Having doubt of the doctrine may be interpreted as evidence of personal inadequacy or moral failing.
8. Dispensing of existence — the group essentially dictates who is worthy of belonging and who is an outsider. Outsiders are seen as "unenlightened" or "not saved" and are rejected if they are critical of the group or are not converted to adopt the group's ideology. The "outside world" that is external to the group are essentially deemed as having no authoritive credibility.

== Studies of war and atrocity survivors ==
Several of his books featured mental adaptations that people made in extreme wartime environments: Death in Life: Survivors of Hiroshima (1967), Home from the War: Vietnam Veterans—Neither Victims nor Executioners (1973), and The Nazi Doctors: Medical Killing and the Psychology of Genocide (1986). Regarding Hiroshima and Vietnam survivors or Nazi perpetrators, Lifton believed that the psychic fragmentation suffered by his subjects was an extreme form of the pathologies that arise in peacetime life due to the pressures and fears of modern society.

His studies of the behavior of people who had committed war crimes both individually and in groups, concluded that while human nature is not innately cruel and only rare sociopaths can participate in atrocities without suffering lasting emotional harm, such crimes do not require any unusual degree of personal evil or mental illness. He says that they are nearly sure to happen given certain conditions (either accidental or deliberately arranged), which Lifton called "atrocity-producing situations". The Nazi Doctors was the first in-depth study of how medical professionals rationalized their participation in the Holocaust, from the early stages of the T-4 Euthanasia Program to the extermination camps.

In the Hiroshima and Vietnam studies, Lifton also concluded that the sense of personal disintegration that many people experienced after witnessing death and destruction on a mass scale could ultimately lead to a new emotional resilience—but that without the proper support and counseling, most survivors would remain trapped in feelings of unreality and guilt. In her 2005 autobiography My Life So Far, Jane Fonda described Lifton's work with Vietnam veterans, along with that of fellow psychiatrists Leonard Neff, Chaim Shatan, and Sarah Haley, as "tireless and empathetic".

In 1975, the BBC adapted Lifton's book Death in Life as Episode 31 in Season 11 of their program Horizon. The documentary, To Die, To Live, The Survivors of Hiroshima, was written and directed by Robert Vas, and edited by Peter Goodchild. The program aired on August 6, 1975. In a New York Times review, John Leonard wrote, "I didn't want to watch a whole hour of it. [...] I thought the subtleties of Dr. Lifton's book were obscured by a piling‐on of images intended, and guaranteed, to shock. "

Lifton was one of the first organizers of therapeutic discussion groups on this subject in which mental health practitioners met with veterans face-to-face. He and Dr. Neff successfully lobbied for the inclusion of post-traumatic stress disorder in the Diagnostic and Statistical Manual of Mental Disorders (DSM). His book on Hiroshima survivors won the 1969 National Book Award in Science.

== Theories of totalism and the protean self ==
Totalism, a word which he first used in Thought Reform, is Lifton's term for the characteristics of ideological movements and organizations that desire total control over human behavior and thought. Lifton's usage differs from theories of totalitarianism, as it can be applied to the ideology of groups that do not wield governmental power.

In Lifton's opinion, though such attempts always fail, they follow a common pattern and cause predictable types of psychological damage in individuals and societies. He finds two common motives in totalistic movements: the fear and denial of death, channeled into violence against scapegoat groups that are set up to represent a metaphorical threat to survival, and a reactionary fear of social change.

In his later work, Lifton focused on defining the type of change to which totalism is opposed, for which he coined the term the protean self. In the book of the same title, he states that the development of a "fluid and many-sided personality" is a positive trend in modern societies. He said that mental health now requires "continuous exploration and personal experiment", which requires the growth of a purely relativist society that is willing to discard and diminish previously established cultures and traditions.

== Critiques of modern war and terrorism ==
Following his work with Hiroshima survivors, Lifton became a vocal opponent of nuclear weapons, arguing that nuclear strategy and warfighting doctrine made even mass genocide banal and conceivable. While not a strict pacifist, he spoke against U.S. military actions in his lifetime, particularly the Vietnam War and Iraq War, believing that they arose from irrational and aggressive aspects of American politics motivated by fear.

In 1993, he said:

What's happening there [in Bosnia] merits the use of the word genocide. There is an effort to systematically destroy an entire group. It's even been conceptualized by Serbian nationalists as so-called "ethnic cleansing." That term signifies mass killing, mass relocation, and that does constitute genocide.

Lifton regarded terrorism as an increasingly serious threat due to the proliferation of nuclear and chemical weapons and totalist ideologies. He did, however, criticize the Bush administration's "war on terrorism" as a misguided and dangerous attempt to "destroy all vulnerability". His 1999 book, Destroying the World to Save It, described the apocalyptic terrorist sect Aum Shinrikyo as a forerunner of "the new global terrorism".

Lifton was a witness for the defense at the 1973 trial of the Camden 28, notable for its acquittal verdict on charges of burglarizing draft board offices during the Vietnam War on the basis of jury nullification. He also testified for the plaintiffs in a lawsuit for victims of the Buffalo Creek flood in 1972.

== Appearances ==
Lifton is featured in the 2003 documentary Flight From Death, a film that investigates the relationship of human violence to fear of death, as related to subconscious influences. In 2006, Lifton appeared in a documentary on cults on the History Channel, Decoding the Past, along with fellow psychiatrist Peter A. Olsson. On May 18, 2008, Lifton delivered the commencement address at Stonehill College, where he received an honorary Doctor of Literature degree, and discussed the apparent "Superpower Syndrome" experienced by the United States in the modern era.

== Awards ==
- 1987: National Jewish Book Award in the Holocaust category for The Nazi Doctors: Medical Killing and the Psychology of Genocide

== Bibliography ==
- Thought Reform and the Psychology of Totalism: A Study of "Brainwashing" in China. New York: Norton. 2012 [1961]. ISBN 0-8078-4253-2.; Reprinted, with a new preface: University of North Carolina Press, 1989 (Online at Internet Archive).
- Death in Life: Survivors of Hiroshima, Random House (New York City), 1968.
- Revolutionary Immortality: Mao Tse-Tung and the Chinese Cultural Revolution, Random House, 1968.
- Birds, Words, and Birds (cartoons), Random House, 1969.
- History and Human Survival: Essays on the Young and the Old, Survivors and the Dead, Peace and War, and on Contemporary Psychohistory, Random House, 1970.
- Boundaries, Canadian Broadcasting Corporation (Toronto), 1969, published as Boundaries: Psychological Man in Revolution, Random House, 1970.
- Home from the War: Vietnam Veterans—Neither Victims nor Executioners, Simon & Schuster (New York City), 1973.
- (With Eric Olson) Living and Dying, Praeger, 1974.
- The Life of the Self: Toward a New Psychology, Simon & Schuster, 1976.
- Psychobirds, Countryman Press, 1978.
- (With Shuichi Kato and Michael Reich) Six Lives/Six Deaths: Portraits from Modern Japan (originally published in Japanese as Nihonjin no shiseikan, 1977), Yale University Press (New Haven, CT), 1979.
- The Broken Connection: On Death and the Continuity of Life, Simon & Schuster, 1979.
- (With Richard A. Falk) Indefensible Weapons: The Political and Psychological Case against Nuclearism, Basic Books (New York City), 1982.
- The Nazi Doctors: Medical Killing and the Psychology of Genocide, Basic Books, August 2000 (first edition 1986).
- The Future of Immortality and Other Essays for a Nuclear Age, Basic Books, 1987.
- (With Eric Markusen) The Genocidal Mentality: Nazi Holocaust and Nuclear Threat, Basic Books, 1990.
- The Protean Self: Human Resilience in an Age of Fragmentation, Basic Books, 1993.
- (With Greg Mitchell) Hiroshima in America: Fifty Years of Denial, Putnam's (New York City), 1995.
- Destroying the World to Save It: Aum Shinrikyo, Apocalyptic Violence, and the New Global Terrorism, Owl Books, 2000.
- (With Greg Mitchell) Who Owns Death? Capital Punishment, the American Conscience, and the End of Executions, Morrow, 2000.
- Superpower Syndrome: America's Apocalyptic Confrontation With the World, Nation Books, 2003.
- Witness to an extreme century: a memoir, New York: Free Press: 2011.
- Lifton, Robert Jay (15 October 2019). Losing Reality: On Cults, Cultism, and the Mindset of Political and Religious Zealotry (epub ed.). New York, London: New Press. ISBN 9781620975121.
- Surviving Our Catastrophes: Resilience and Renewal from Hiroshima to the COVID-19 Pandemic, The New Press, 2023.

=== Lifton as editor ===
- (With Jacob D. Lindy) Beyond Invisible Walls: The Psychological Legacy of Soviet Trauma, East European Therapists and Their Patients, Edwards Brothers (Lillington, NC), 2001.
- The Woman in America, Houghton (Boston), 1965.
- America and the Asian Revolutions, Trans-Action Books, 1970, second edition, 1973.
- (With Richard A. Falk and Gabriel Kolko) Crimes of War: A Legal, Political-Documentary, and Psychological Inquiry into the Responsibilities of Leaders, Citizens, and Soldiers for Criminal Acts of War, Random House, 1971.
- (With Eric Olson) Explorations in Psychohistory: The Wellfleet Papers, Simon & Schuster, 1975.
- (With Eric Chivian, Susanna Chivian, and John E. Mack) Last Aid: The Medical Dimensions of Nuclear War, W. H. Freeman, 1982.
- (With Nicholas Humphrey) In a Dark Time: Images for Survival, Harvard University Press, 1984.

== See also ==
- Brainwashing
- Cult
- Destructive cult
- List of cult researchers
- Sociological classifications of religious movements
