= Lapalissade =

Obvious and comical truism

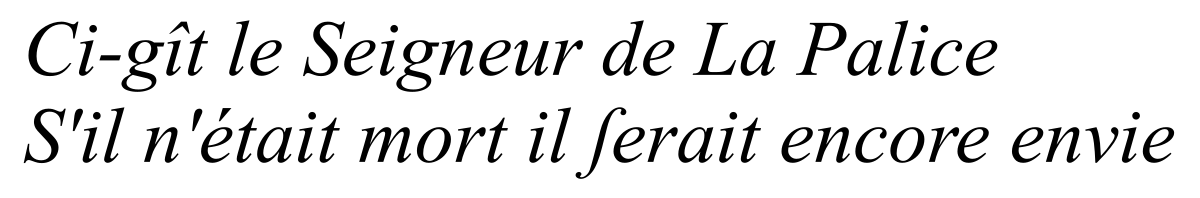
La Palice's epitaph, which led to this figure of speech.

A lapalissade is an obvious truth—i.e. a truism or tautology—which produces a comical effect. It is derived from the name Jacques de la Palice, and the word is used in several languages.

== Origin ==
La Palice's epitaph reads:

"Ci-gît le Seigneur de La Palice: s'il n'était pas mort, il ſerait encore envie."
("Here lies the Seigneur de La Palice: If he weren't dead, he would still be envied.")

These words were misread (accidentally or intentionally) as "... il ſerait [serait] encore en vie" ("... he would still be alive"), where both the long s and the word envie terminating with a regular e rather than the grammatically needed é to turn envie ("to envy") into envié ("envied"), aid in the confusion. In the 16th century this misreading was incorporated into a popular satirical song, and in time many other variants developed, including "... que deux jours avant sa mort / il était encore en vie" ("... that two days before his death / he was still quite alive") and "... et quand il était tout nu, / il n'avait point de chemise" ("... and when he was stark naked / he didn't wear a shirt").

In the early 18th century, Bernard de la Monnoye collected over 50 of these humorous "La Palice" quatrains and published them as a burlesque "Song of La Palice". From that song came the French term lapalissade meaning an utterly obvious truth—i.e. a truism or tautology, and it was borrowed into several other languages. The French phrase "La Palice en aurait dit autant!" ("La Palice would have said as much!") is used to express that a statement is obvious.

== Similar terms ==
In Spanish culture, an analog is a folkloric character Pedro Grullo (Perogrullo) with his perogrulladas: "Verdad de Pedro Grullo, que a la mano cerrada, la llama puño" (The truth of Pedro Grullo, when his hand is closed, he calls it a fist).

In American English, "Captain Obvious" indicates, somewhat pejoratively, that a speaker has said a self-evident truth. Other kinds of trite expressions are "platitude" and "bromide".

== Examples ==
- Most drownings occur in the water.
- Most wars occur during wartime.
- 60 minutes feels like an hour.
- If we are an hour early, then we are 1 hour early.
- Most people are born at a very young age.
- At the end of the day, it is night.

== See also ==
- "In a Cottage in Fife", a Mother Goose nursery rhyme
- Pleonasm
- Captain Obvious for uses of the term in media
