= Jacques de La Palice =

Marshal of France

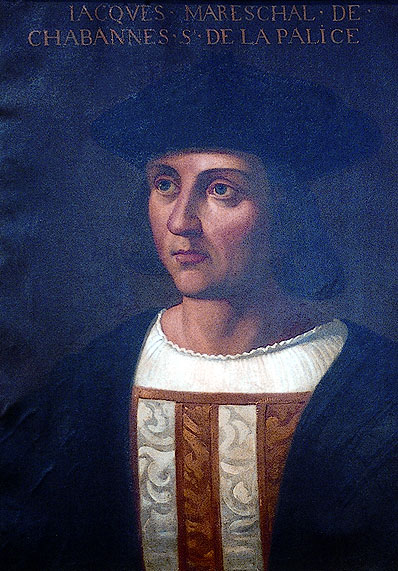
- Painting of La Palice at the Château de Beauregard, Loire Valley
- Born: 1470
- Died: February 24, 1525 (aged 54–55); Battle of Pavia

Jacques II de Chabannes de La Palice (or de La Palisse) (1470 – 24 February 1525) was a French nobleman and military officer. He was the lord of Chabannes, La Palice, Pacy, Chauverothe, Bort-le-Comte and Héron. In 1511, he received the title of Grand Master of France. As a Marshal under Francis I, he fought against Habsburg armies, and died during the battle of Pavia.

== Biography ==
He was born at Lapalisse, Auvergne. At 15, La Palice entered the service of King Charles VIII of France, of his same age. His first battle was that of Saint-Aubin-du-Cormier (1488). Four years later he married Jeanne de Montbéron, daughter of chamberlain Eustache de Montbéron. In 1494 he followed the king in war for the Kingdom of Naples, taking part in the latter city's capture in 1495, as well as in the battle of Fornovo (1498) against the Italian League, which allowed the French army to retreat in their homeland.

After Charles' death, La Palice accompanied the new King, Louis XII, in the campaign for Milan, which the French captured in 1499. He conquered several lands in the Abruzzi and in Apulia, being created viceroy of Abruzzo in 1502. However, he was defeated in the battle of Ruvo di Puglia (1503) and made prisoner by Gonzalo Fernández de Córdoba. He was freed in 1504, the same year his wife died.

In 1507 he commanded the French vanguard in the siege of Genoa, during which he was seriously wounded. In 1509 the war of the League of Cambrai against the Republic of Venice broke out. La Palice took part in the siege of Treviglio and in the victorious battle of Agnadello; he was then made commander-in-chief of the French troops in Lombardy and, sent to help Emperor Maximilian I, he took part against the Venetians in the unsuccessful siege of Padua in 1509. In 1511, after Charles d'Amboise's death, La Palice became the French overall commander in Italy and was made Grand Master of France.

After Gaston de Foix's arrival to Italy, La Palice was put under him, successfully relieving Bologna from the Spanish's siege. He took part in the battle of Ravenna (1512), in which de Foix died, being succeeded by La Palice himself as French commander-in-chief. However his slow actions allowed the defeated enemies to recover and expel the French from Lombardy.

Returning to France, he was sent to the Pyrenees to rescue John III of Navarre, but soon he was diverted to Thérouanne, then the last French possession in the Artois, to counter the English troops. On 6 August 1513, he was defeated and made prisoner at the Battle of the Spurs. After John III's parallel defeat, this marked the end of Louis XII's expansionism. La Palice was dismissed, and retired to his lands, where, in 1514, he married Marie de Melun, who gave him four children.

Louis's successor, Francis I, gave him back the title of Grand Master, adding that of Marshal of France on 2 January 1515. La Palice, under the command of Marshal Aubigny, took part to the invasion of Piedmont and the capture of Prospero Colonna in Villafranca, and was one of Francis' lieutenants at the battle of Marignano. After the signing of the Treaty of Noyon which ended the war, La Palice returned to France.

La Palice was sent at Calais as negotiator of the peace with Charles V. As the participants did not reach an agreement, he returned to Italy as military leader under Marshal Lautrec, commanding the French main line at the battle of Bicocca (1522), in which he was defeated by Colonna. La Palice was sent again to the Pyrenees, and then to the successful attempt to rescue Marseille from Duke of Bourbon's siege. After the conquest of Avignon, he moved to Milan which had been abandoned by the Spaniards. On 28 October 1524, at the side of his King, La Palice began the siege of Pavia, defended by Antonio de Leyva. When the Imperial-Spanish army arrived, the battle of Pavia began (24 February 1525). La Palice was captured by German Landsknechte during the fighting, and was executed some time later.

== Lapalissade ==
La Palice gave his name to the Lapalissade, a comical truism. The coinage originates from la Palice's epitaph, which reads

"Ci-gît le Seigneur de La Palice: s'il n'était pas mort, il ferait encore envie."
("Here lies the Lord of La Palice: If he weren't dead, he would still stir envy.")

These words were misread (accidentally or intentionally) as "...il ſerait [serait] encore en vie" ("...he would still be alive"), where the long s favours the confusion. In the 16th century, this misreading was incorporated into a popular satirical song, and in time many other variants developed. In the early 18th century, Bernard de la Monnoye collected over 50 of these humorous "La Palice" quatrains, and published them as a burlesque Song of La Palice. From that song came the French term lapalissade meaning an utterly obvious truth—i.e. a truism or tautology.

== See also ==
- Château de La Palice
- Italian Wars
