= The Song of La Palice =

"The Song of La Palice" (in French: La chanson de la Palisse) is a burlesque song attributed to Bernard de la Monnoye (1641–1728) about alleged feats of French nobleman and military leader Jacques de la Palice (1470–1525). From that song came the French term lapalissade meaning an utterly obvious truth—i.e. a truism or tautology. When you say something obvious, the interlocutor responds '"So would have said La Palice!" (in French: La Palice en aurait dit autant!).

== History of the song ==
Jacques de la Palice died in the battle of Pavia (1525), while fighting against the Spanish armies as a Marshal under Francis I. The epitaph on his tombstone reads

Ci-gît le Seigneur de La Palice: S’il n'était pas mort, il ferait encore envie.
("Here lies Sir de la Palice: If he weren't dead, he would be still envied.")

Some sources claim that the last two verses came from a song that his soldiers composed in his honor, which would have said something along these lines

Hélas ! La Palice est mort	Alas! La Palice has died
Il est mort devant Pavie	He died before Pavia
Hélas ! S’il n'était pas mort	Alas! If he wasn't dead,
Il ferait encore envie.	He would still be envied.

Apparently the last verse was misread, intentionally or accidentally, as il serait encore en vie ("he would be still alive"). The misreading was due perhaps to the similarity between the letter f and the long s, ſ. In any case, not many years after the battle (which was a resounding fiasco for the French), a satirical song became widely popular in France, which began like this:

Hélas ! La Palice est mort	Alas! La Palice has died
Il est mort devant Pavie	He died before Pavia
Helás ! Si il n'était pas mort	Alas! If he wasn't dead
Il serait encore en vie	He would be still alive
Quand le roy partit de France,	When the king departed from France
A la malheur il partit	To his misfortune he went out
Il en partit la Dimanche,	He departed on Sunday
Et le Lundy il fut pris.	And on Monday he was captured.
Il en partit la Dimanche,	He departed on Sunday
Et le Lundy il fut pris.	And on Monday he was captured.
Rens toy, rens toy, roy de France,	"Surrender, surrender, king of France,
Rens toy donc, car tu es pris.	Surrender now, for you've been captured."
...	...

La Palice is not mentioned again in the song. Between the 16th and the 18th century, the first stanza of this song evolved and multiplied into a great many humorous quatrains, which attributed to Jacques several other similar feats, like his custom to always go in person when eating at his neighbors. An often-quoted example is

Monsieur d'la Palisse est mort,	Sir de la Palisse is dead,
Il est mort devant Pavie,	He died before Pavia,
Un quart d'heure avant sa mort,	A quarter hour before his death,
il était encore en vie.	He was still quite alive.

In the early 18th century the French poet Bernard de la Monnoye collected no less than 51 variants, which he joined into a comical song. The song was a success at the time, but was then forgotten until its rediscovery in the 19th century by Edmond de Goncourt. Edmond is also credited with coining the French noun lapalissade. The word was eventually borrowed into Italian as lapalissiano (adj.), and into Portuguese as lapaliçada (n.).

However, some sources have a different version: they claim that, somewhere between the 18th and 19th centuries, an unrelated song — originally a parody of the Chanson de Roland — was rewritten to refer to La Palice.

Besides the long version attributed to de Monnoye, there is another version collected by de Lincy

== The de la Monnoye version ==
This version, allegedly compiled or composed by Bernard de la Monnoye, comes from the French Wikipedia and other sources:

Messieurs, vous plaît-il d'ouïr
Gentlemen, would you like to hear
L'air du fameux La Palisse ?
The song of famous la Palisse?
Il pourra vous réjouir
You may indeed enjoy it
Pourvu qu'il vous divertisse.
As long as you find it fun.

La Palisse eut peu de bien
La Palisse didn't have the means
Pour soutenir sa naissance,
To pay for his own birth,
Mais il ne manqua de rien
But he did not lack anything
Dès qu'il fut dans l'abondance.
Once his riches were plenty.

Bien instruit dès le berceau,
Well-educated since the cradle
Jamais, tant il fut honnête,
Never, so well-natured he was,
Il ne mettait son chapeau,
He wouldn't put on his hat,
Qu'il ne se couvrît la tête.
Without covering his head.

Il était affable et doux,
He was affable and sweet,
De l'humeur de feu son père,
With the humor of his late father,
Et n'entrait guère en courroux
And he would not lose his temper
Si ce n'est dans la colère.
Unless he was enraged.

Il buvait tous les matins,
He drank every morning
Un doigt, tiré de la tonne,
A little wine from a barrel,
Et mangeant chez ses voisins,
And when eating at his neighbors,
Il s'y trouvait en personne.
He would be there in person.

Il voulait dans ses repas
He wanted at his meals
Des mets exquis et fort tendres,
Tasty and very tender dishes
Et faisait son Mardi Gras,
And had his Mardi Gras
Toujours la veille des Cendres.
Always on the eve of Ashes.

Ses valets étaient soigneux
His servants took great care
De le servir d'andouillettes,
To serve him andouillettes,
Et n'oubliaient pas les œufs,
And didn't forget the eggs,
Surtout dans les omelettes.
Especially in the omelettes.

De l'inventeur du raisin,
Of grape's the inventor
Il révérait la mémoire;
He honored the memory;
Et pour bien goûter le vin
And to best enjoy the wine
Jugeait qu'il en fallait boire.
He thought that one should drink it.

Il disait que le nouveau
He said that the new wine
Avait pour lui plus d'amorce;
Had for him more zest,
Et moins il y mettait d'eau
And the less water he put in it
Plus il y trouvait de force.
The stronger he found it.

Il consultait rarement
He rarely consulted
Hippocrate et sa doctrine,
Hippocrates and his doctrine,
Et se purgeait seulement
And he purged himself only
Lorsqu'il prenait médecine.
When he took some medicine.

Il aimait à prendre l'air
He loved to get fresh air
Quand la saison était bonne;
When the weather was pleasant;
Et n'attendait pas l'hiver
And he would not wait until winter
Pour vendanger en automne.
To reap the autumn harvest.

Il épousa, se dit-on,
He married, it is said,
Une vertueuse dame;
A virtuous lady;
S'il avait vécu garçon,
Had he lived as a bachelor
Il n'aurait pas eu de femme.
He would not have had any wife.

Il en fut toujours chéri,
He was very fond of her,
Elle n'était point jalouse;
She was not at all jealous;
Sitôt qu'il fut son mari,
As soon as he was her husband,
Elle devint son épouse.
She did become his spouse.

D'un air galant et badin
A gallant and playful fellow
Il courtisait sa Caliste,
He courted his Caliste,
Sans jamais être chagrin,
Without ever feeling sad
Qu'au moment qu'il était triste.
Except when he happened to be gloomy.

Il passa près de huit ans,
He lived about eight years,
Avec elle, fort à l'aise;
With her, well contented;
Il eut jusqu'à huit enfants :
He had all of eight children:
C'était la moitié de seize.
That is one half of sixteen.

On dit que, dans ses amours,
They say that, in his love life,
Il fut caressé des belles,
He was caressed by beauties,
Qui le suivirent toujours,
Who followed him, always,
Tant qu'il marcha devant elles.
When he walked ahead of them.

Il brillait comme un soleil;
He shone like a sun,
Sa chevelure était blonde :
He had a mane of blond hair,
Il n'eût pas eu son pareil,
He would have had no equals
S'il avait été seul au monde.
Had he been the only one.

Il eut des talents divers,
He had diverse talents,
Même on assure une chose :
Some even claimed this:
Quand il écrivait des vers,
When he did write in verse,
Qu'il n'écrivait pas en prose.
He did not write in prose.

Au piquet, par tout pays,
At piquet, everywhere,
Il jouait suivant sa pente,
He played as he would it,
Et comptait quatre-vingt dix,
And counted four score and ten,
Lorsqu'il faisait un nonante.
Whenever he scored ninety.

Il savait les autres jeux,
He knew the other games,
Qu'on joue à l'académie,
That are played in the academy,
Et n'était pas malheureux,
And he didn't feel very sorry
Tant qu'il gagnait la partie.
Whenever he won the game.

En matière de rébus,
In the matter of riddles,
Il n'avait pas son semblable :
He did have no peer:
S'il eût fait des impromptus,
If he came out with the answer,
Il en eût été capable.
He had it figured out.

Il savait un triolet,
He could recite a triolet,
Bien mieux que sa patenôtre :
Much better than the Pater Noster:
Quand il chantait un couplet,
While singing a couplet,
Il n'en chantait pas un autre.
He would not sing any other.

Il expliqua doctement
He lectured scholarly
La physique et la morale :
On physics and ethics:
Il soutint qu'une jument
He claimed that a mare
Est toujours une cavale.
Is always a she-horse.

Par un discours sérieux,
By an exacting argument
Il prouva que la berlue
He proved that blurry sight
Et les autres maux des yeux
And other ills of the eyes
Sont contraires à la vue.
Are obstacles to our vision.

Chacun alors applaudit
Then everyone applauded
A sa science inouïe :
His unheard-of wisdom:
Tout homme qui l'entendit
Everyone who understood it
N'avait pas perdu l'ouïe.
Did not fail to hear it.

Il prétendit, en un mois,
He intended, in one month,
Lire toute l'Écriture,
To read the whole of Scripture,
Et l'aurait lue une fois,
And would have read it once,
S'il en eût fait la lecture.
If he had got through the reading.

Il fut à la vérité,
He was, to tell the truth
Un danseur assez vulgaire;
A rather mediocre dancer,
Mais il n'eût pas mal chanté,
But he wouldn't have sung so badly
S'il avait voulu se taire.
If he had chosen to shut up.

Il eut la goutte à Paris,
He had the gout in Paris,
Longtemps cloué sur sa couche,
Bedridden for a long while,
En y poussant des hauts cris,
Whenever he screamed out loud,
Il ouvrait bien fort la bouche.
He opened his mouth very wide.

Par son esprit et son air
By his spirit and grace,
Il s'acquit le don de plaire;
He acquired the gift of pleasing;
Le Roi l'eût fait Duc et Pair,
The King would have made him Duke and Peer,
S'il avait voulu le faire.
If that had been His will.

Mieux que tout autre il savait
Better than anyone, he knew
À la cour jouer son rôle :
To play his role at court:
Et jamais lorsqu'il buvait
And never, while drinking
Ne disait une parole.
Would he say a single word.

On s'étonne, sans raison,
People are astonished, without reason,
D'une chose très commune;
Of a rather common thing;
C'est qu'il vendit sa maison :
That he sold his house:
Il fallait qu'il en eût une.
For surely he did have one.

Il choisissait prudemment
He chose, prudently,
De deux choses la meilleure;
The better of any two things;
Et répétait fréquemment
And would often repeat
Ce qu'il disait à tout heure.
What he kept saying all the time.

Lorsqu'en sa maison des champs
When at his country home
Il vivait libre et tranquille,
He lived free and tranquil,
On aurait perdu son temps
And it would be a waste of time
À le chercher à la ville.
To look for him in town.

Un jour il fut assigné
Once he was brought
Devant son juge ordinaire;
To trial on a common law cause;
S'il eût été condamné,
Had he been condemned there,
Il eût perdu son affaire.
He would have lost his case.

Il voyageait volontiers,
He was quite fond of travel,
Courant par tout le royaume;
Going all over the kingdom,
Quand il était à Poitiers,
When he was in Poitiers
Il n'était pas à Vendôme.
You would not find him in Vendôme.

Il se plaisait en bateau;
He enjoyed a boat ride
Et soit en paix, soit en guerre,
And, whether in peace or in war,
Il allait toujours par eau,
He would always go by water
À moins qu'il n'allât par terre.
Unless he went by land.

On raconte, que jamais
People say that he would never
Il ne pouvait se résoudre
Have taken the decision
À charger ses pistolets,
Of loading his two pistols
Quand il n'avait pas de poudre.
When he had no ammunition.

On ne le vit jamais las,
One never saw him weary,
Ni sujet à la paresse :
Nor standing in idleness:
Tant qu'il ne dormait pas,
When he was not sleeping,
On tient qu'il veillait sans cesse.
He was incessantly awake.

Un beau jour, s'étant fourré
One day he got himself
Dans un profond marécage,
In a rather deep quagmire,
Il y serait demeuré,
He would have been stuck there,
S'il n'eût pas trouvé passage.
If he hadn't found the way out.

Il fuyait assez l'excès;
He eschewed all excess;
Mais dans les cas d'importance,
But, on occasions that did matter,
Quand il se mettait en frais,
When he went to great expense
Il se mettait en dépense.
He did give a lavish diner

C'était un homme de cœur,
There was a man of great heart,
Insatiable de gloire;
Always striving for glory;
Lorsqu'il était le vainqueur,
When he came out as the winner,
Il remportait la victoire.
He carried away the victory.

Les places qu'il attaquait,
The towns that he attacked,
À peine osaient se défendre;
Barely put up a defense;
Et jamais il ne manquait
And he never happened to miss
Celles qu'on lui voyait prendre.
Those whom he managed to hit.

Dans un superbe tournoi,
At a superb tournament,
Prêt à fournir sa carrière,
Ready to run the course,
Il parut devant le Roi :
He came before the King:
Il n'était donc pas derrière.
And thus he was not behind Him.

Monté sur un cheval noir,
Rinding a black horse,
Les dames le reconnurent;
The ladies recognized him;
Et c'est là qu'il se fit voir
And it was then that he showed himself
À tous ceux qui l'aperçurent.
To all who noticed him.

Mais bien qu'il fût vigoureux,
But, vigorous as he would be,
Bien qu'il fût le diable à quatre,
Much as he exerted himself,
Il ne renversa que ceux
He dismounted none but those
Qu'il eut l'adresse d'abattre.
Whom he did manage to fell.

Un devin, pour deux testons,
A seer, for a pair of coins,
Lui dit, d'une voix hardie,
Told him, in a hoarse voice,
Qu'il mourrait delà des monts
That he would die over the mountains
S'il mourait en Lombardie.
If he died in Lombardy.

Il y mourut, ce héros,
And there he died, that hero,
Personne aujourd'hui n'en doute;
Nobody today doubts it;
Sitôt qu'il eut les yeux clos,
As soon as he closed his eyes
Aussitôt il n'y vit goutte.
He could not see a damn thing.

Il fut, par un triste sort,
He was, by sorry fate,
Blessé d'une main cruelle.
Wounded by a cruel hand
On croit, puisqu'il en est mort,
Since he died of it, we fear
Que la plaie était mortelle.
That the wound was a mortal one.

Regretté de ses soldats,
Lamented by his soldiers,
Il mourut digne d'envie;
His death is to be envied,
Et le jour de son trépas
And the day of his death
Fut le dernier jour de sa vie.
Was the last day of his life.

Il mourut le vendredi,
He died on a Friday,
Le dernier jour de son âge;
The last day of his age,
S'il fût mort le samedi,
Had he died on the Saturday,
Il eût vécu davantage.
He would have lived longer.

J'ai lu dans les vieux écrits
I've read in old manuscripts
Qui contiennent son histoire,
Which hold his life's history,
Qu'il irait en Paradis,
That he will go to Heaven
S'il était en Purgatoire.
If he is now in Purgatory.

== The de Lincy version ==
These verses are quoted by de Boone from de Lincy:

Hélas, la Palice est mort,	Alas, la Palice has died
Il est mort devant Pavie;	He died before Pavia
Hélas, s'il n'était pas mort,	Alas, if he wasn't dead
Il serait encore en vie !	He would be still alive
Hélas, qui l'eut bien grand tort	Alas, he made a big mistake
De s'en aller à Pavie !	By going to Pavia
Hélas, s'il ne fut point mort,	Alas, if he didn't die there
Il n'eut point perdu la vie.	He wouldn't have lost his life.
Il était fort bien vêtu,	He was very well dressed,
Son habit doublé de frise.	With his velvet-lined cloak.
Et quand il était tout nu,	And when he was stark naked
Il n'avait point de chemise.	He didn't wear a shirt.
Deux jours avant de mourir	Two days before he died
Ecrivait au roi, son maître.	He wrote to the king, his lord.
Hélas, s'il n'eut point écrit,	Alas, if he hadn't written it
Le Roi n'eut pas lu sa lettre.	The king wouldn't have read his letter.
Il était très bon chrétien	He was a very good Christian
Et vivait dans l'abstinence,	And lived in abstinence,
Et quand il ne disait rien	And when he didn't say a thing
Il observait le silence.	He remained in silence.
Il est mort le vendredi	He died on a Friday
Passé la fleur de son âge.	Past the prime of his life.
S'il fut mort le samedi,	Had he died on the Saturday
Il eut vécu davantage.	He would have lived longer.
Les médecins sont d'accord,	All physicians do agree,
Et toute la pharmacie,	And the whole pharmacy,
Que deux jours avant sa mort	That two days before his death
Il était encore en vie.	He was still alive.
