= Flagrant =

Flagrant may refer to:

- Flagrant foul, a term in basketball
- In flagrante delicto, caught in the act of committing a crime

== See also ==
- Obvious (disambiguation)
