= Lac du Lachtelweiher =

Lake in France

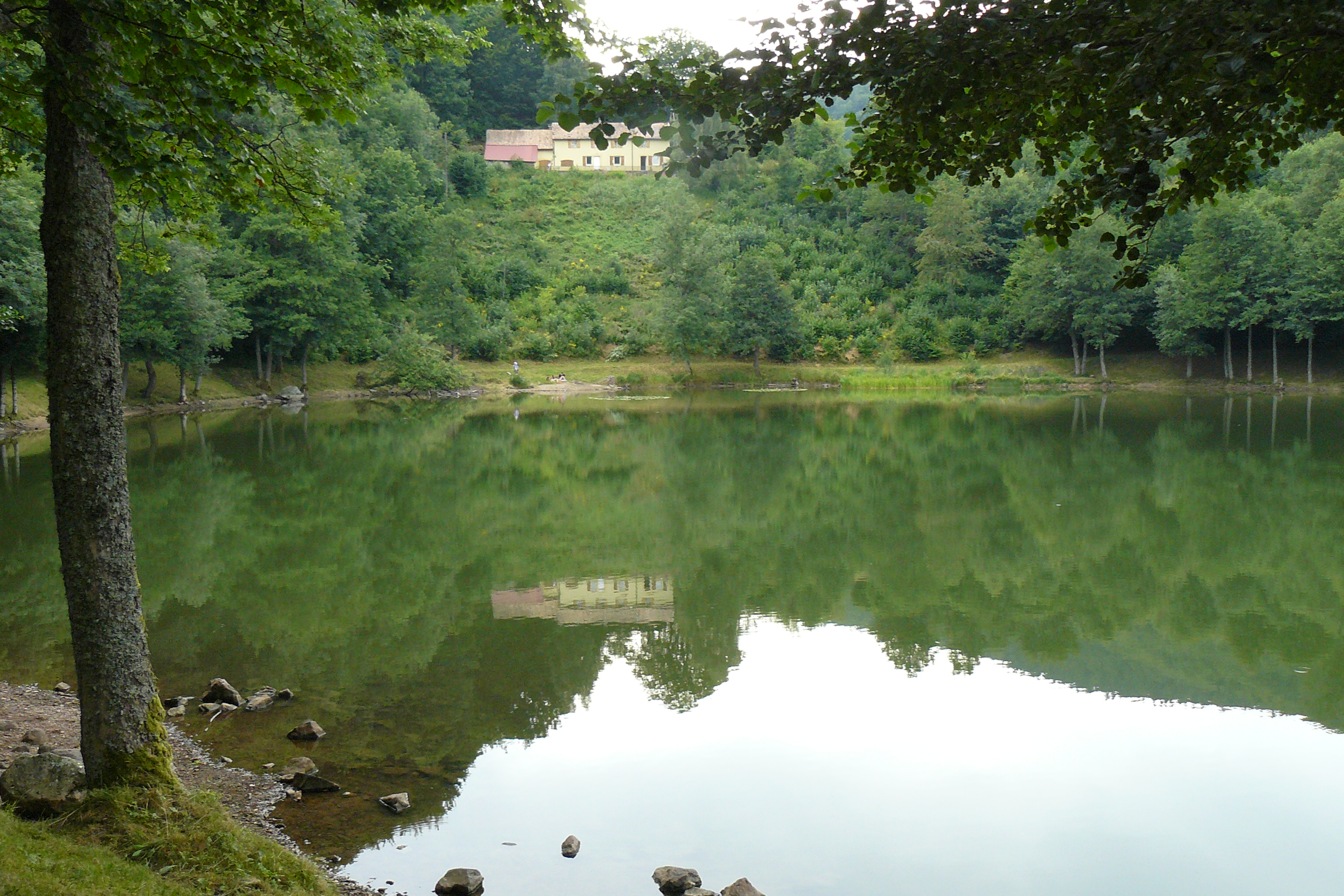

- Location within France
- Location: Haut-Rhin
- Coordinates: 47°46′38″N 6°55′52″E
- Basin countries: France
- Surface area: 0.015 km^{2} (0.0058 sq mi)
- Max. depth: 5 m (16 ft)
- Surface elevation: 740 m (2,430 ft)

Lac du Lachtelweiher is a lake in Haut-Rhin, France. At an elevation of 740 m, its surface area is 0.015 km^{2}. The French name is a tautology as the German Weiher already means pond/lake.
