= Lac du Baggersee =

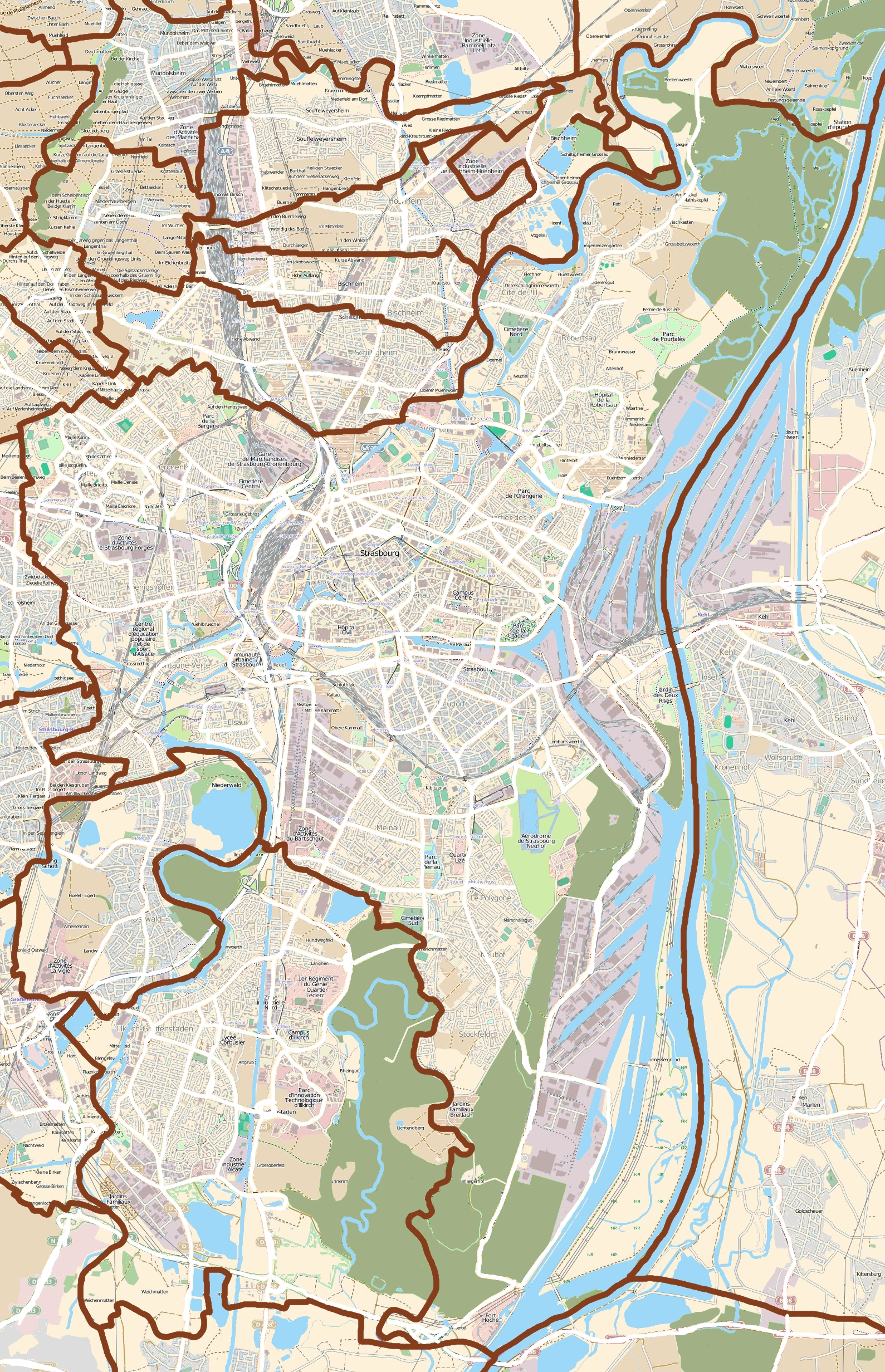
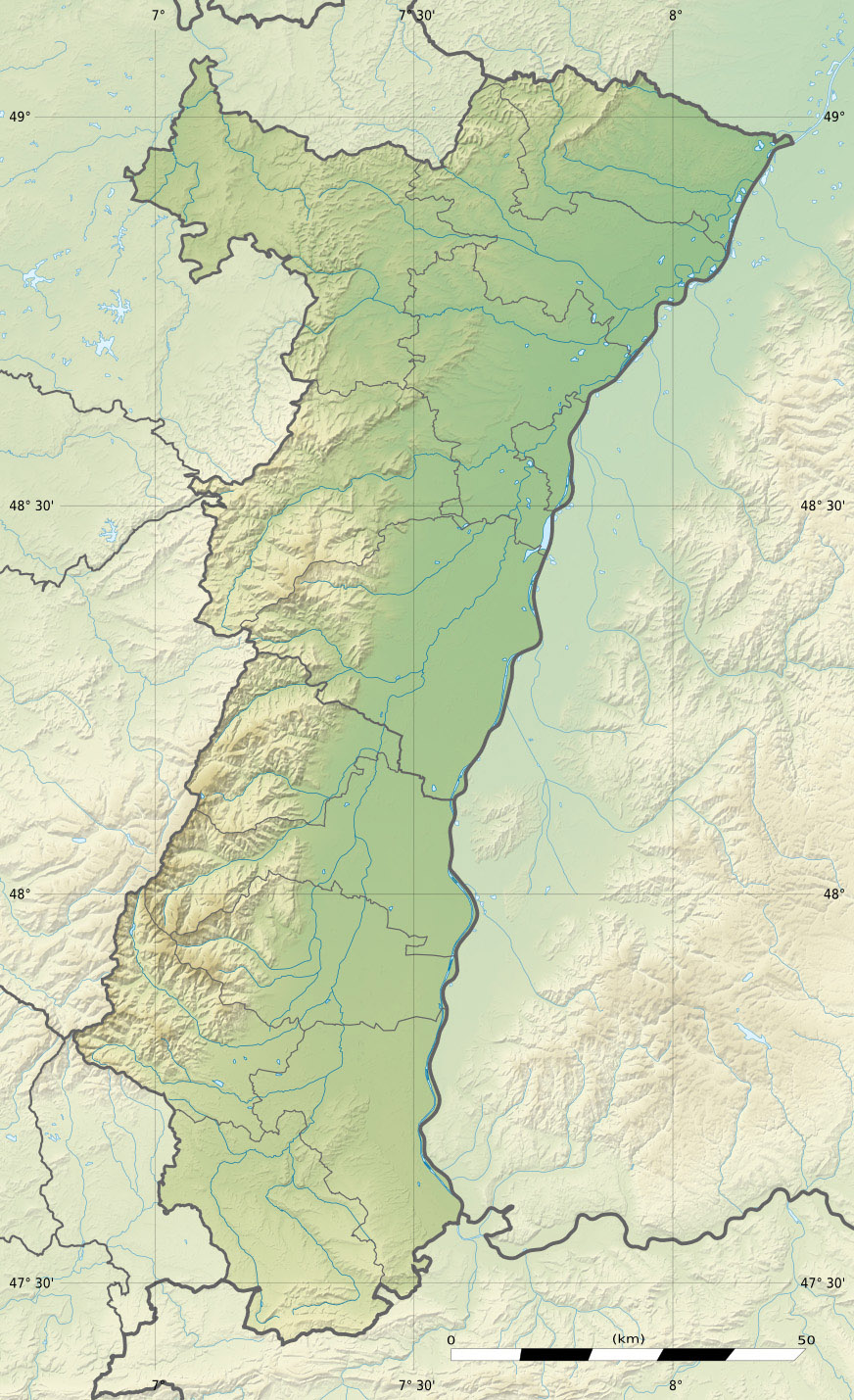
- Location within Strasbourg Location within Alsace
- Location: Bas-Rhin
- Coordinates: 48°32′36″N 7°44′43″E
- Type: artificial
- Basin countries: France

Lac du Baggersee is a lake in Bas-Rhin, France. The French name is a tautology as See already means lake in German.
