= Obvious =

Obvious may refer to:

== Music ==
=== Albums ===
- Obvious (4Him album), 1998
- Obvious (Plus One album), 2002

=== Songs ===
- "Obvious", a song by Christina Aguilera from the album Christina Aguilera, 1999
- "Obvious", a song by Blink-182 from the album Blink-182, 2003
- "The Obvious", a song by Orgy from Punk Statik Paranoia, 2003
- "Obvious" (Westlife song), 2004
- "Obvious" (LeToya song), 2006
- "Obvious", a song by The Operation M.D. from the album We Have an Emergency, 2007
- "Obvious" (Charlee song), 2011
- "Obvious", a song by Ariana Grande from the album Positions, 2020
- "Obvious", a song by Craig David from the album 22 (2022)
- "Obvious", a song by the Drums from the album Jonny (2023)
- "Obvious" (Chris Brown song), a song by Chris Brown, 2026

== Other uses ==
- Obvious, an art collective that created the 2018 painting Edmond de Belamy
- Ron Obvious (Monty Python)

== See also ==
- Captain Obvious (disambiguation)
- Obviously (disambiguation)
