= Cellettes, Loir-et-Cher =

Cellettes
- Commune
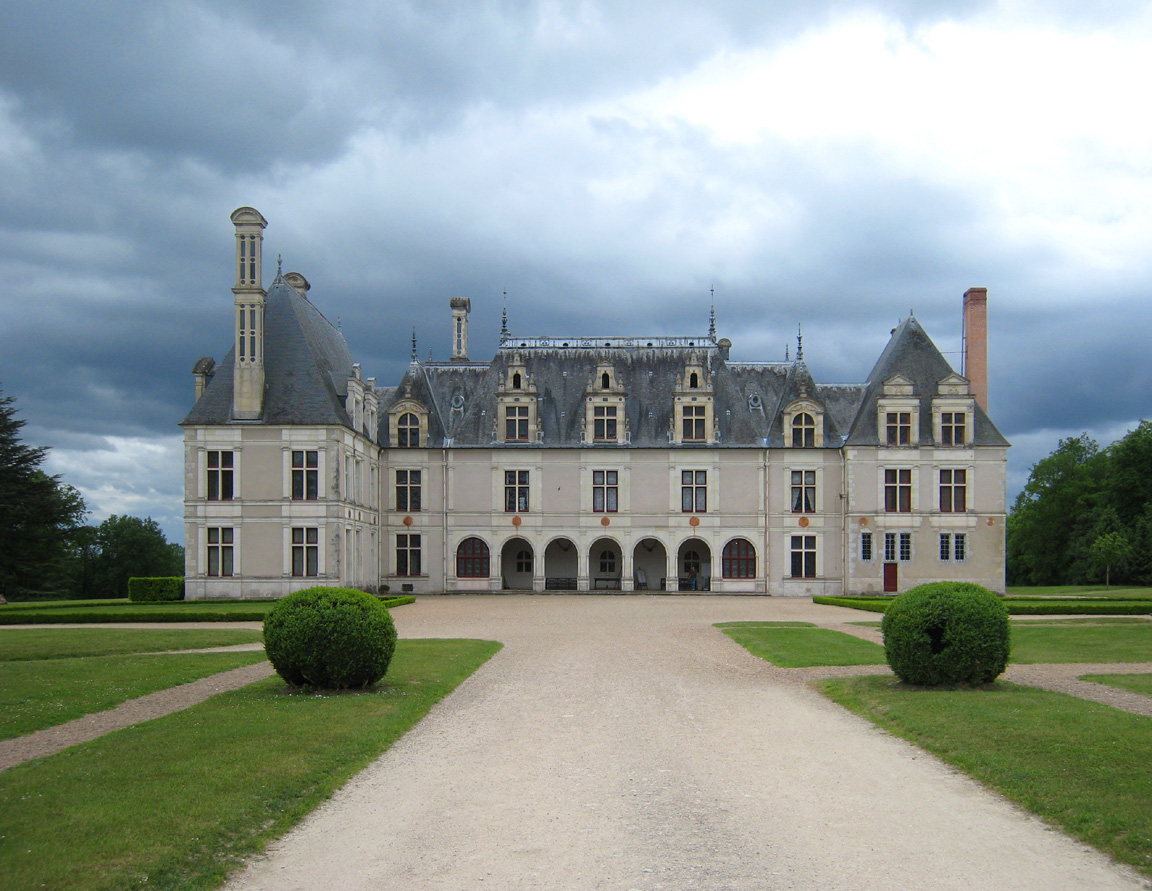
- Château de Beauregard

- Coat of arms
- Location of Cellettes
- Location within France Location within Centre-Val de Loire
- Coordinates: 47°31′45″N 1°22′53″E
- Country: France
- Region: Centre-Val de Loire
- Department: Loir-et-Cher
- Arrondissement: Blois
- Canton: Vineuil
- Intercommunality: CA Blois Agglopolys

Government
  - Mayor (2020–2026): Joël Rutard
- Area^{1}: 20.96 km^{2} (8.09 sq mi)
- Elevation: 80 m (260 ft)
- Highest elevation: 107 m (351 ft)
- Lowest elevation: 68 m (223 ft)
- Population (2023): 2,715
  - Density: 129.5/km^{2} (335.5/sq mi)
- Time zone: UTC+01:00 (CET)
  - Summer (DST): UTC+02:00 (CEST)
- INSEE/Postal code: 41031 /41120
- ^{1} French Land Register data, which excludes lakes, ponds, glaciers > 1 km^{2} (0.386 sq mi or 247 acres) and river estuaries.

Cellettes (French pronunciation: [selɛt]) is a commune in the Loir-et-Cher department, central France.

== Population ==
Historical population

Year	Pop.	±% p.a.
1793	1,027	—
1821	1,032	+0.02%
1846	1,240	+0.74%
1872	1,121	−0.39%
1901	1,144	+0.07%
1926	912	−0.90%
1946	954	+0.23%
1962	938	−0.11%
1968	1,004	+1.14%

Year	Pop.	±% p.a.
1975	1,200	+2.58%
1982	1,709	+5.18%
1990	1,922	+1.48%
1999	2,138	+1.19%
2007	2,238	+0.57%
2012	2,431	+1.67%
2017	2,633	+1.61%
2023	2,715	+0.51%

Source: EHESS and INSEE (1968-2023)

== See also ==
- Communes of the Loir-et-Cher department
- Château de Beauregard
