= Obviously =

Obviously may refer to:

- Obviously (album) by Lake Street Drive, 2021
- "Obviously" (song) by McFly, 2004

== See also ==
- Obvious (disambiguation)
