= Sine dicendo =

Inherently superfluous statement

Sine dicendo is an inherently superfluous statement, the truth of which can be taken for granted. When put under scrutiny, it becomes apparent that the statement has not added any new or useful information to the conversation (i.e., 'It's always in the last place you look', or 'dogs are loyal').

== See also ==
- Cliché
- Dictum
