= Paul II Ardier =

French administrator, diplomat, magistrate, and financier

Paul Ardier
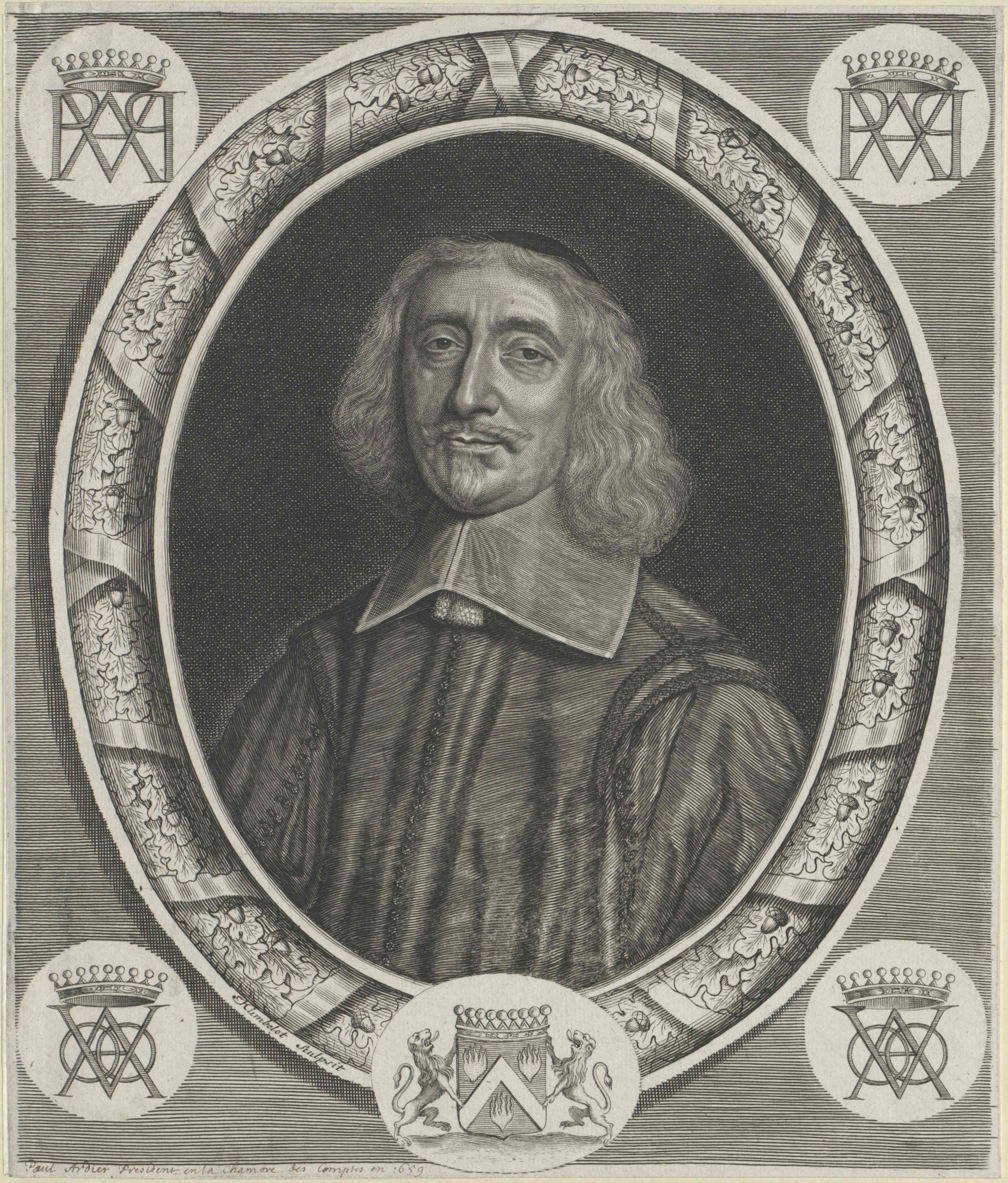
- Engraving. Portrait of Paul II Ardier
- Born: April 1595; Issoire
- Died: November 7, 1671 (aged 76); Beauregard Castle
- Title: President of the Chambre des Comptes Treasurer General of France Foreign Affairs Clerk
- Spouse: Louise Olier
- Parents: Paul Ardier (father); Suzanne Phélypeaux (mother)

Signature
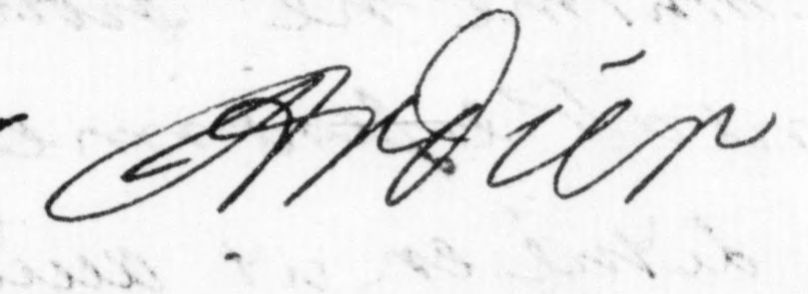

Paul II Ardier de Beauregard, born April 1595 in Issoire and died November 7, 1671 in his château de Beauregard, was a French administrator, diplomat, magistrate and financier.

He served his uncles of the Phélypeaux family, then more directly Louis XIII, as first clerk in the Foreign Affairs department from 1626 to 1632. After a mission to Constantinople, he drafted the minutes of the 1626-1627 assembly of notables and accompanied the King and Richelieu on their travels from 1627 to 1630. In 1630, he missed the opportunity to become Secretary of State.

In 1633 and 1634, writing memoirs at Richelieu's request, he developed geopolitical thinking by analyzing the European diplomatic situation. Within the general framework of the Thirty Years' War, he recounts the conflicts in Valtellina and the War of the Mantuan Succession. Faithful to Richelieu's political thinking, he recommends solutions to increase the influence of the French king, particularly in Italy. His use of erudition in the service of geopolitical objectives was later taken up by the entourage of Chancellor Séguier.

He joined the Chambre des Comptes, where he was one of the presidents from 1634 to 1650. Like his father before him, he engaged in a variety of financial activities, lending large sums to great lords and the State.

He then retired to his château de Beauregard. There, he enlarged his estate, enabling the seigneury to become a viscounty, and completed the “galerie des illustres” begun by his father. He died a wealthy man. His inheritance then passed to the de Fieubet family.

== Family ==
Paul II Ardier was the son of Paul Ardier (1563-1638), Treasurer of the Savings Bank in 1627, Lord of Beauregard, Vineuil, Vaugelay: and his wife Suzanne Phélypeaux (died 1651), daughter of Louis Phélypeaux and sister of Secretaries of State Paul Phélypeaux de Pontchartain and Raymond Phélypeaux d'Herbault.

- He was baptized on April 17, 1595 in Issoire, his family's home town. The eldest son, he had many brothers and sisters:
- Raymond-Jean Ardier (1601-1673), seigneur de Vaugelay, member of the Toulouse Parliament, maître des requêtes in 1638;
- Henri or Hervin Ardier, abbot of Saint-André de Clermont and Saint-Étienne du Mas-d'Azil, prior of Sainte-Croix de Savigneux and provost of Cerisy-sur-Somme;
- Louis Ardier (died 1676), seigneur de Vineuil, secretary to the king, Conseiller d'État, involved in the Fronde and mentioned by Bussy-Rabutin in his Histoire amoureuse des Gaules;

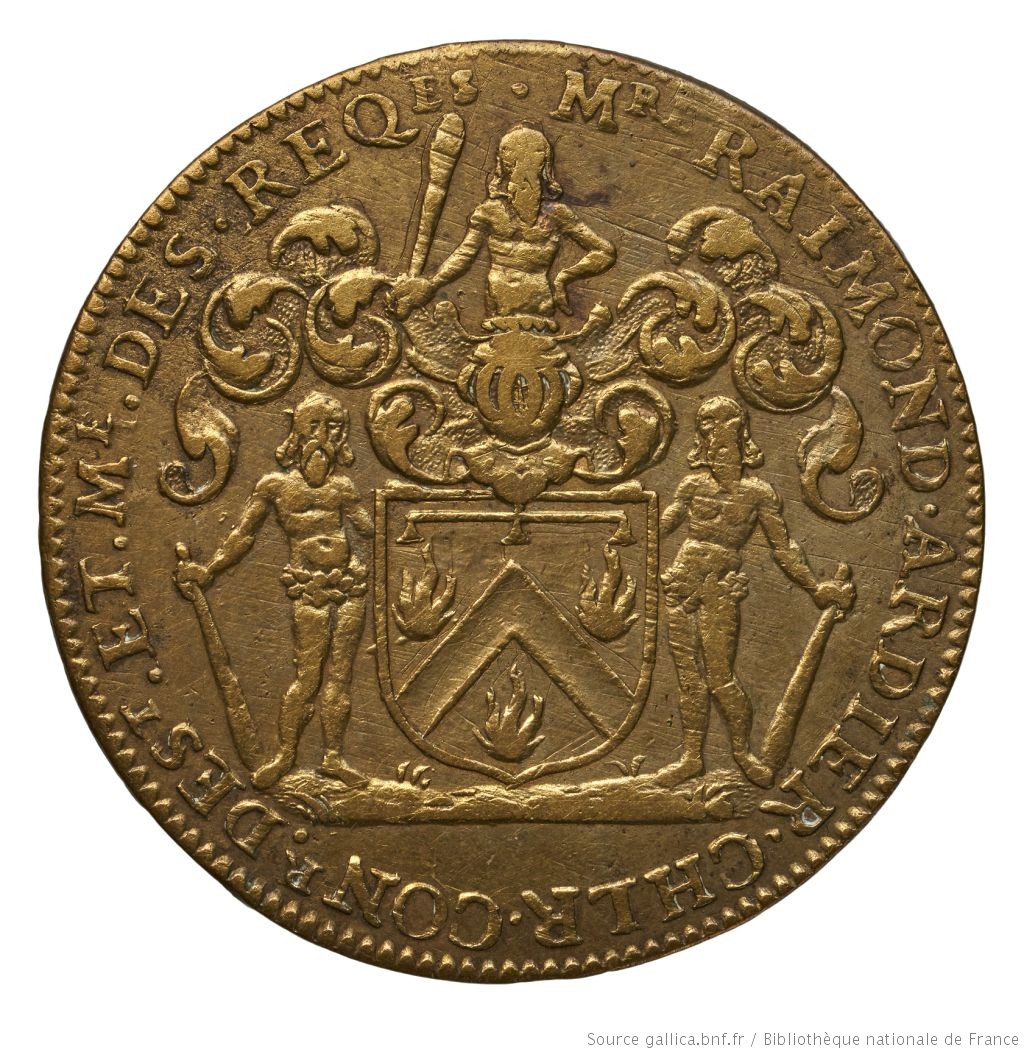
Raymond Ardier token (1638), BNF.

- Claude or Claudine Ardier (1600-1657), who in 1618 married Gaspard Ier de Fieubet (1577-12 August 1647), clerk to Paul Ier Ardier;
- Suzanne Ardier (1609-1679), who in 1624 married Jean Dyel, seigneur des Hameaux, first president of the Court of Aids in Rouen;
- Élisabeth Ardier (b. 1610), who in 1633 married Claude Gobelin (d. 1666), army intendant and Conseiller d'État.
- The Revue d'Auvergne mentions two additional sisters
- Marguerite Ardier, wife of Jacques Legendre, general controller of gabelles;
- Jacquette Ardier, wife of M. de Chalandrat, seigneur de Saint-Yvoine,
- but this hypothesis is contradicted by Albert de Remacle's genealogy, which makes Marguerite and Jacquette the daughters of Jean Ardier and Magdeleine Guérin (they are therefore Paul II Ardier's first cousins, not his sisters).

Paul II Ardier's mother's membership of the upwardly mobile Phélypeaux network was the key to his career. In 1626, he attested to the skills of another member of this network, François Coquille. The Ardier family is also directly linked to the gabelle farm, run by Thomas Bonneau's company. These family networks were both servants of the state and financial backers of the monarchy, which was in constant need of money.

== Biography ==
=== Foreign Affairs Clerk ===
Paul II Ardier became a clerk in the service of his uncles Phélypeaux in 1618 at the latest. From 1624, he was first clerk at the Foreign Affairs Department, and was the only first clerk from 1626 to 1632. He was also the King's secretary, an ennobling position.

He took a full part in France's foreign policy, drafting dispatches, organizing the work of the office and proposing memoirs on specific issues. He was not just a man of the office: on a mission whose objectives are not known, he was briefly sent to Constantinople, from where he returned in November 1626.

On his return to Paris, he became secretary to the Assembly of Notables, which met from November 1626 to March 1627, the last before the revolutionary upheavals of 1787. This was a mission of trust. Under the presidency of Gaston d'Orléans, forty-five nobles, prelates and representatives of the sovereign courts met to find solutions to the deficit without creating new taxes. The war prevented the implementation of the proposed measures. The minutes of the meeting were drawn up by Paul Ardier, and published 25 years later, in 1652.

After the death of Raymond Phélypeaux d'Herbault, Paul II Ardier's uncle, in 1629, the new Secretary of State for Foreign Affairs, Claude Bouthiller, retained Ardier as his first clerk. No doubt his skills were recognized. This is what Ardier implies when he assures us that he is “following my ordinary employ prez Monsieur Bouthiller by the express command that the King and the Cardinal have given me to assist him, as I have cy-devant fait par Monseigr de Herbault de manière que j'ai obei à la volonté de nos supérieurs” (following my ordinary employ prez Monsieur Bouthiller by the express command that the King and the Cardinal have given me to assist him, as I have cy-devant fait par Monseigr de Herbault de manière que I have obeyed the will of our superiors). So, Louis XIII and Richelieu asked him to keep his post. This argument enables him to justify his personal choice to keep his position, which may appear as a lack of loyalty to the Phélypeaux, but it is true that the Bouthillers were then allied to the Phélypeaux by marriage.

Although Ardier was not one of Richelieu's leading “creatures” like Père Joseph or Claude Bouthillier, he nevertheless worked with Louis XIII and Richelieu. He accompanied them on all their travels and campaigns from 1627 to 1630, including the siege of La Rochelle in 1627-1628, during which he wrote numerous letters, and the victory at Pas de la Suse and against the Huguenots in Languedoc in 1629. In 1630, Ardier commissioned memoirs to justify the King of France's claim to the fortress of Pignerol.

That same year, 1630, Louis XIII considered Ardier to succeed Charles Le Beauclerc as Secretary of State for War, but Richelieu had another candidate, Jean de Flesselles, who made the mistake of bragging too soon. When Louis XIII learned of this, he became angry, and in the end neither of the two candidates was chosen. Abel Servien became Secretary of State for War.

=== Geopolitical analysis ===
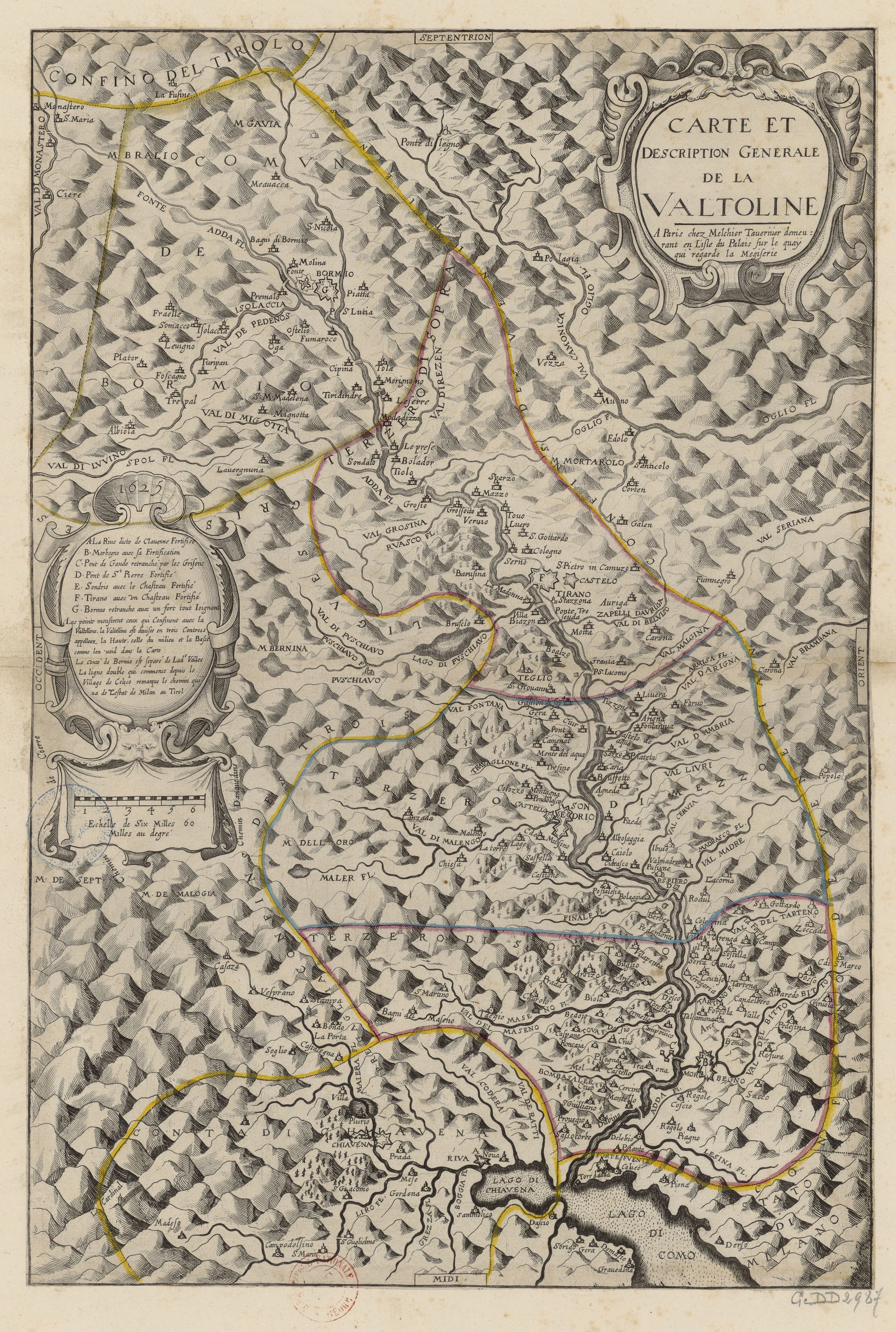
Map and general description of Valtoline. Melchior Tavernier, Paris, 1625, BNF.

At Richelieu's request, after he had left the Foreign Office, Ardier wrote two memoirs on foreign policy, notably on the conflicts over the Grisons and the Valtellina valley, one of the great affairs of his time.

In his Mémoire sur les affaires générales de la Chrestienté (April 1633), Ardier analyzes the situation in Europe at the time, in the midst of the Thirty Years' War, focusing on events concerning France. In his view, it is “on the basis of the past and the present [that] one can judge the future according to what is appropriate for the good of the State”, which corresponds to the concept of historia magistra vitae, which was very widespread at the time.

This memoir focuses on Valtellina, the War of the Mantuan Succession and the conflict between Spain and the United Provinces. As the Habsburgs were seen as France's natural enemies, allies had to be sought against them, particularly in Valtellina. The end of the Grisons, allies of the King of France, in this valley, to the benefit of the Habsburgs, meant a decline in French influence. Ardier welcomes the acquisition of Pignerol, whose strategic importance in facilitating French action in Italy is obvious, but deliberately overlooks the conditions of this acquisition as laid down in the Treaty of Cherasco. In fact, the King had agreed to cede to the Duke of Savoy lands belonging to the Duke of Mantua, even though he was a French ally. Two years later, Ardier still considers it useful to keep this secret.

Ardier explains how France could restore its influence in Italy, by forming a league of Northern Italian states against the Habsburgs, which appears to have been a political goal of Louis XIII and Richelieu. He also advocated French support for the United Provinces, Sweden and certain princes of the Holy Roman Empire, again against the Habsburgs. The aim would be to achieve reconciliation between Catholics and Protestants under the aegis of the French king, in order to put an end to Habsburg domination.

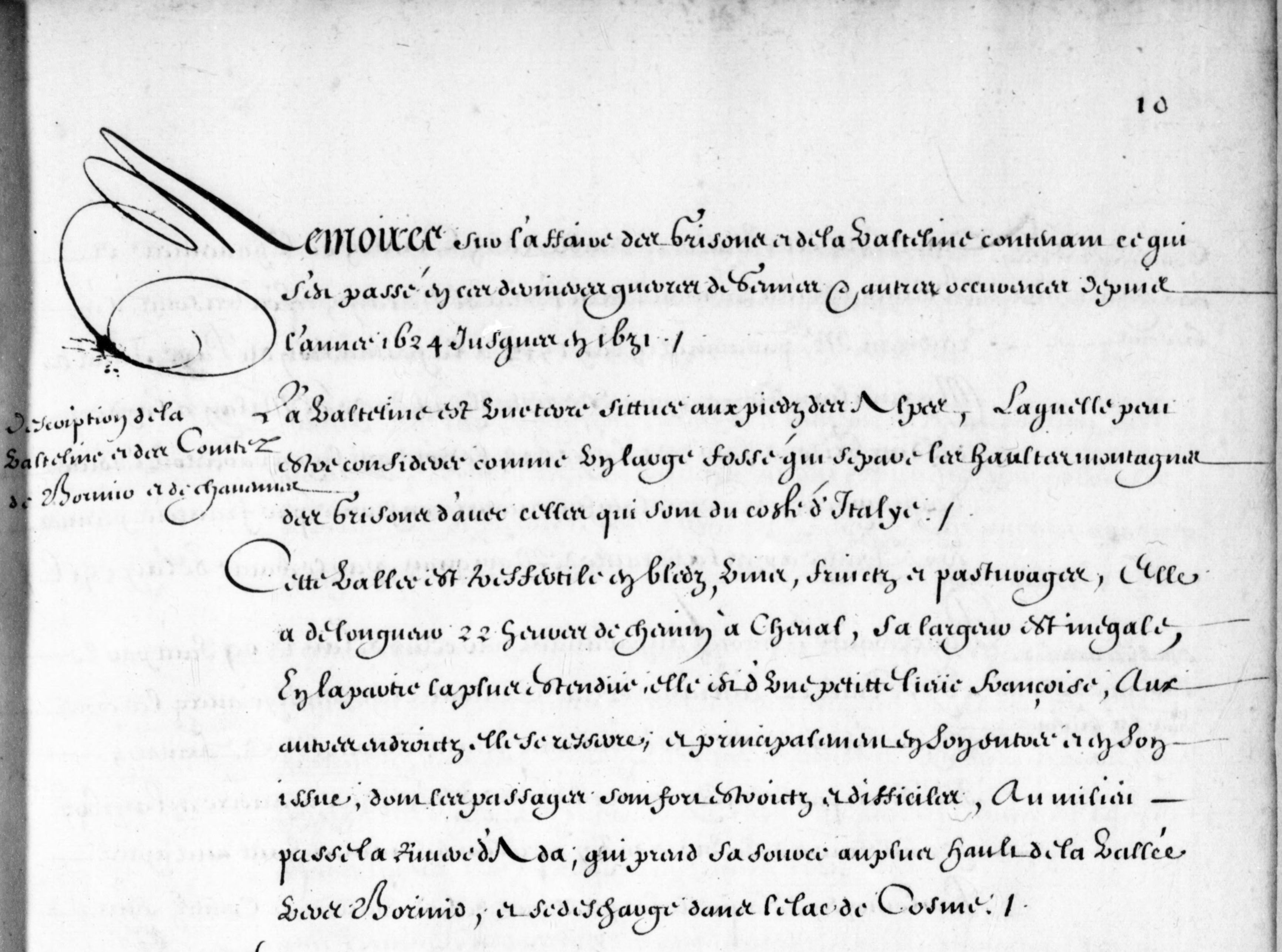
Title page of a copy of Mémoire sur l'affaire des Grisons et de la Valteline (1634). Paris, BNF.

For Ardier, these alliances with Protestant countries and rulers did not betray the Catholic cause, which Louis XIII also served. The aim was to make Louis XIII a kind of arbiter for Christendom. In this, Ardier is faithful to Richelieu's political thinking, as is another of his contemporaries, Guez de Balzac.

In his Mémoire sur l'affaire des Grisons et de la Valteline (October 1634), Ardier takes up the elements already set out in the previous memoir. He recounts the conflicts linked to Valtellina from 1601 to the end of the War of the Mantuan Succession in 1631. He emphasizes the strategic importance of the Valtellina valley for the Habsburgs, since it enabled them to cross the Alps and join their various possessions, from Milan to the Holy Roman Empire. He advocated action by the King of France to rescue the Grisons, his allies whose domination of Valtellina had been undermined, and restore the situation there to his advantage.

Ardier does not theorize, and follows a completely pragmatic approach in his memoirs, which for Richelieu are supports for French foreign policy. This deliberate use of historical and geographical erudition in the service of the monarchy's actions was later taken up by the entourage of Chancellor Séguier.

=== Chambre des Comptes and business affairs ===
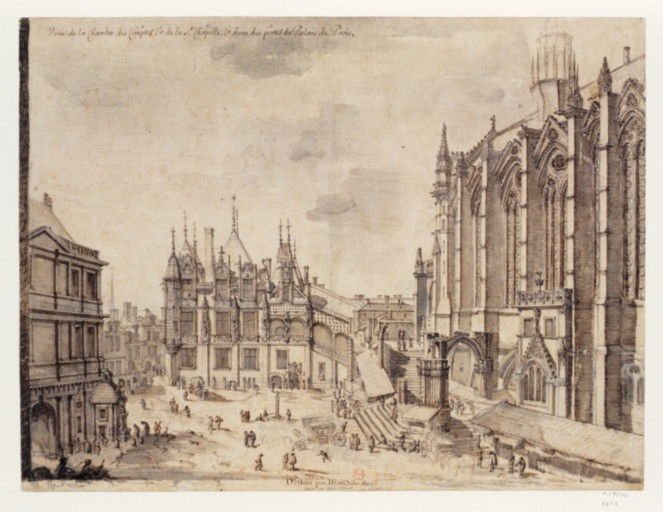
View of the Chambre des Comptes and the Sainte-Chapelle, by Israël Silvestre (1621-1691). Paris, BNF.

Paul II Ardier left diplomacy for finance, returning to his father's line of work. He was appointed Treasurer General of France and Treasurer General of Finances in the Generalitat of Paris. In 1632, he joined the Chambre des ComptesPi 7. He was appointed Master of Accounts in 1633 and, in 1634, became one of the presidents of the Chambre des Comptes (which comprised twelve presidents plus the first president). He succeeded his relative Balthazar II Gobelin, seigneur de Brinvilliers (father-in-law of the poisoner Marie-Madeleine Dreux d'Aubray, known as Brinvilliers). He held this position until his resignation in 1650. He was succeeded by Louis I Phélypeaux de Pontchartrain, his first cousin. All belonged to the Phélypeaux network, already mentioned.

In the same year, 1634, he was one of the financial backers of the fermiers généraux des gabelles of Thomas Bonneau's company, for the considerable sum of 40,000 livres. He was thus both a financial officer and a trader who advanced funds to the monarchy. His father did the same, for 48,000 livres. This suggests the family's wealth. In 1653, he lent 16,000 livres to Duke Claude de Saint-Simon (father of the memoirist). This debt was never repaid, but passed on to Gaspard III de Fieubet and his heirs. His debtors also included the Prince de Condé, heir to a debt contracted by the Montmorency family, which was also passed on to Gaspard III de Fieubet and his heirs. These outstanding debts give rise to the payment of constituted annuities. He also lends to members of the Phélypeaux family. In making these annuity loans, he engaged in financial activities that were less conspicuous and more highly regarded than those of his fatherCh 2.In 1650, at the age of 55, Ardier retired from all official functions, or almost. He was still the King's commissioner to the Estates of Brittany in 165111, helping to keep the Estates of Brittany loyal to the King during the turbulent Fronde. He then moved to his château de Beauregard. Ardier's retirement may be linked to the second disgrace of his relative Léon Bouthillier, but it may also be explained by his desire to live nobly on his lands.

=== Great lord ===
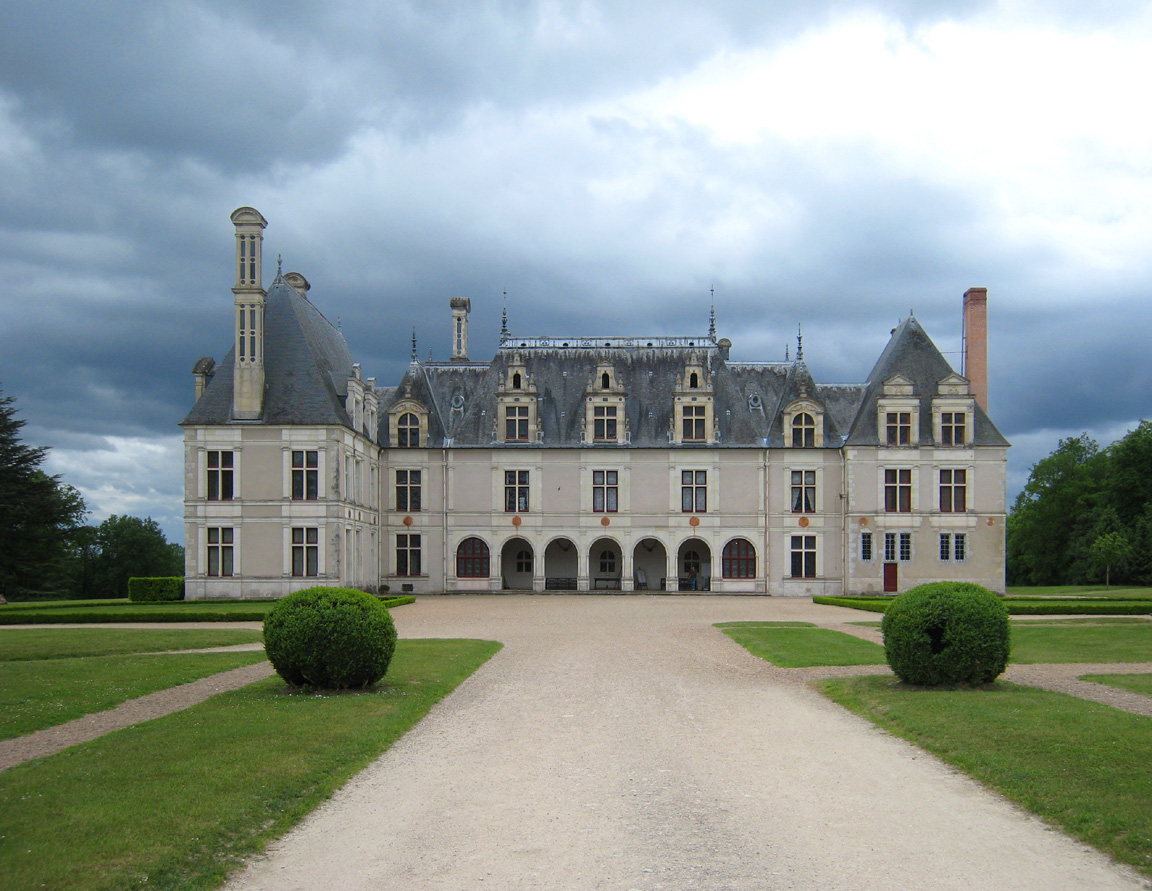
Château de Beauregard (commune of Cellettes, Loir-et-Cher), 2007.

In Paris, Paul Ardier père had a townhouse built in 1606 in the Marais district, near Place Royale. His son Paul II also lived there. The latter's brothers-in-law, Gaspard de Fieubet and Jean Dyel des Hameaux, also lived in the district. For his Parisian townhouse, Paul Ardier commissioned works from well-known artists of the time.

In the Blésois region, he inherited his father's seigneuries, principally the seigneury of Vineuil and the château de Beauregard (parish of Cellettes), which his father had had completely rebuilt. In 1650, he purchased the fief of La Varenne and its mill, and in 1654, the seigneury of Conon and the right of high justice in the parish of Cellettes. Thanks to these acquisitions, the estate around Beauregard exceeded 200 hectares, and the Ardier family's total holdings exceeded 500 hectares. In 1654, he achieved his goal: his lands were large enough to become a viscounty, and he became Viscount of Beauregard-le-Bel. Possession of Beauregard was essential to the Ardier family's strategy of social advancement: it contributed to the father's nobility and gave the son a title.

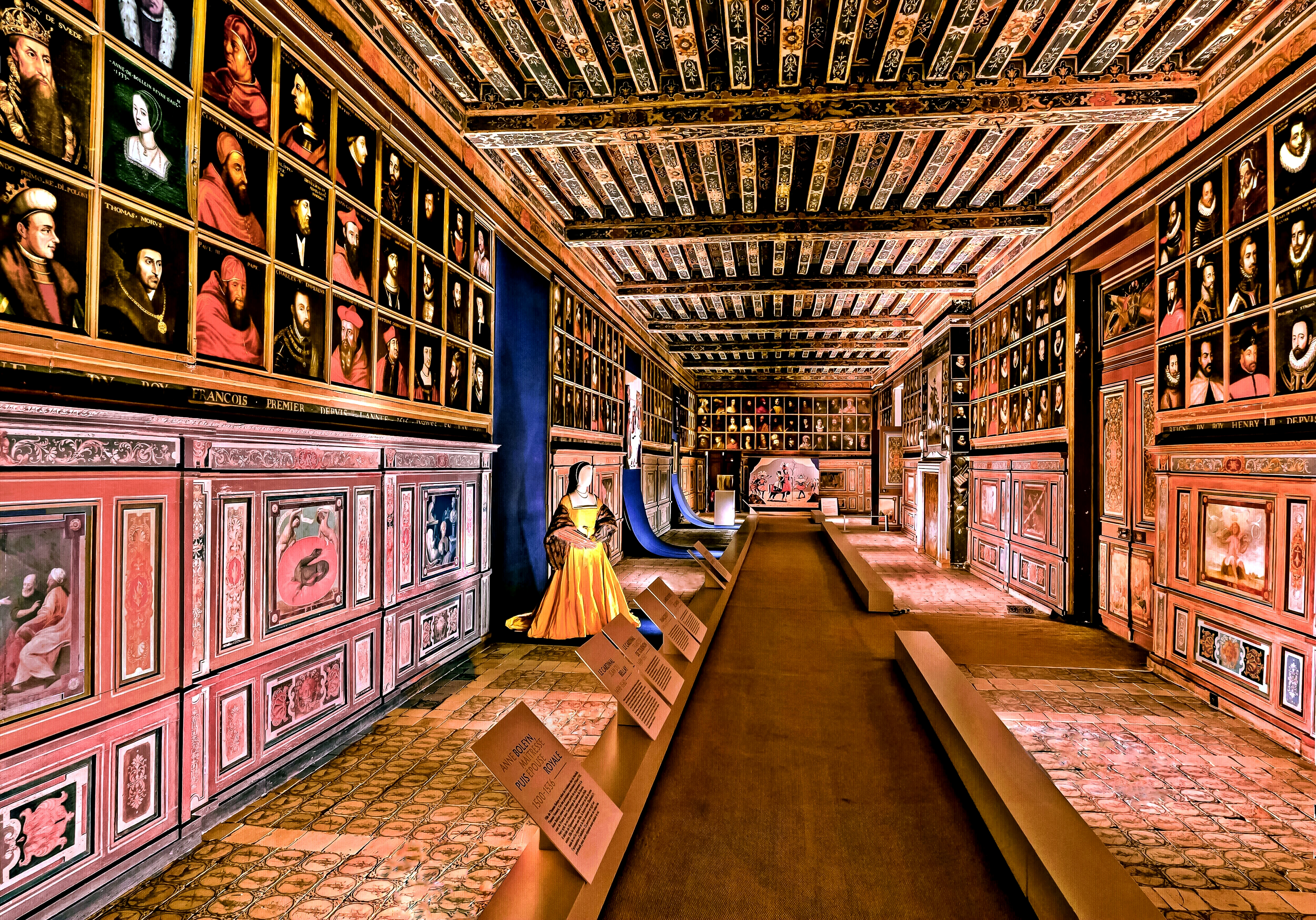
La galerie des illustres du Château de Beauregard (Loir-et-Cher), 2019.

Paul Ardier père had a “galerie des illustres” installed in the Château de Beauregard, comprising more than 300 portraits of historical figures, for which the château is still renowned. Paul II Ardier completed this “galerie des illustres” by adding some forty portraits of his contemporaries. This gallery includes portraits of kings, statesmen and soldiers, particularly from the time of Henri IV and Louis XIII, as well as Philip IV of Spain, Emperor Ferdinand II, King Gustav Adolph of Sweden, Charles-Emmanuel I of Savoy, etc. It thus expresses the loyalty of the Ardiers to the kings they served.

Around 1646, Paul II Ardier completed one of his father's projects: finishing the paving on the floor of this gallery, in Delft blue earthenware, normally far too fragile to walk on, which his father had commissioned as early as 1627. He also took charge of the orangery. This corresponded to the fashion of the time, but perhaps also to a personal taste, since he kept an orange tree pruning kit in his study.

Paul II Ardier died in his château de Beauregard on November 7, 1671. His entrails were buried in Cellettes, while his body, like that of his parents and other family members, was interred in the convent of the Feuillants in the Faubourg Saint-Honoré in Paris.

He left a considerable fortune, in seigneuries as well as in money, 1,400,000 livres. This was slightly less than that of his father, 1,800,000 livres. However, his fortune lagged far behind that of some of his more successful contemporaries, such as Servien, Fouquet and Colbert. Compared to them, he remains a secondary figure. Philippe de Champaigne painted a portrait of Paul II Ardier, which was engraved by Humblot. The original has disappeared.

== Works ==
- L'Assemblée des notables tenue à Paris ès années 1626 et 1627 (1627, published in 1652).
- Mémoire sur les affaires générales de la Chrestienté (April 1633).
- Mémoire sur l'affaire des Grisons et Valteline containing what happened in the Genoa affair and other occurrences from 1626 to 1631 (October 1634). These two memoirs were first published together in 1677.

== Posterity ==
In 1627, Paul II Ardier married Louise Olier, daughter of Jacques Olier (d. 1632) maître des requêtes, intendant, conseiller d'État, and sister of Jean-Jacques Olier, the famous founder of the Sulpicians.

They had two daughters:

- Marie-Marguerite Ardier (died 1685), who married:
- Jacques Le Pelletier de La Houssaye, conseiller au Parlement de Paris.
- in 1654 his cousin Gaspard III de Fieubet, chancellor to the Queen and Conseiller d'État. Through this marriage, the Fieubets inherited the viscounty of Beauregard and the seigneury of Vineuil.
- Louise Ardier, nun at the Visitation de Blois.

== Heraldry ==

Blazon:

Azure, a chevron Or between three flames Argent.

In modern times, this type of coat of arms is numerous. The chevron Or on a field of Azure is the most frequently used honorific, because it represents the idea of elevation. The chevron is often accompanied by a piece of furniture in base.

== See also ==
- House of Phélypeaux
- Vineuil, Loir-et-Cher
- Château de Beauregard, Loire Valley

== Bibliography ==
- Chablat, Agnès (1994). Une famille de financiers au xviie siècle. Les Ardier, seigneurs de Beauregard. Positions des thèses de l’École des chartes.
- Chablat-Beylot, Agnès (1995). Le château de Beauregard au temps des Ardier. Mémoires de la société des sciences et lettres de Loir-et-Cher.
- Dessert, Daniel (2012). L'argent du sel. Paris: Fayard. ISBN 978-2-213-66276-3.
- Externbrink, Sven (2000). "Faire contrepoids à la puissance d'Espagne' Paul Ardier de Beauregard (1590-1671) et la politique de Richelieu en 1633". Francia. 27 (2): 1–24. doi:10.11588/fr.2000.2.46937. ISSN 2569-5452.
- Frostin, Charles (2006). Les Pontchartrain, ministres de Louis XIV: Alliances et réseau d'influence sous l'Ancien Régime, coll. " Histoire ". Presses universitaires de Rennes. ISBN 978-2-7535-3211-3.
- Hardel, Ch. (1894). Deux plaques commémoratives trouvées en l'église de Vineuil. Bulletin de la société des sciences et lettres du Loir-et-Cher.
- Piccioni, Camille (1928). Les premiers commis des affaires étrangères au xviie et au xviiie siècle. Paris: De Boccard.
