= Cliché =

Overused, unoriginal phrase or opinion

A cliché (UK: /ˈkliːʃeɪ/ or US: /kliːˈʃeɪ/; French: [kliʃe]) is a saying, idea, or element of an artistic work that has become overused to the point of losing its original meaning, novelty, or figurative or artistic power, even to the point of now being bland or uninteresting. In phraseology, the term has taken on a more technical meaning, referring to an expression imposed by conventionalized linguistic usage.

The term, typically deployed pejoratively, is often used in modern culture for an action or idea that is expected or predictable, based on a prior event. Clichés may or may not express a truth. Some are stereotypes, but some are simply truisms and facts. Clichés often are employed for comedic effect, typically in fiction.

Most phrases now considered clichéd originally were regarded as striking but have lost their force through overuse. The French poet Gérard de Nerval once said, "The first who compared a woman to a rose was a poet, the second an imbecile."

A cliché is often a vivid depiction of an abstraction that relies upon analogy or exaggeration for effect, often drawn from everyday experience. Used sparingly, it may succeed, but the use of a cliché in writing, speech, or argument is generally considered a mark of inexperience or a lack of originality. However, some scholars of film have noted that some clichés - such as stock characters - can be employed creatively, either by generating expectations within the narrative or by producing pleasure through the simple thrill of recognition.

== Etymology ==
The word cliché is borrowed from French, where it is a past passive participle of clicher, 'to click', used as a noun; cliché is attested from 1825 and originated in the printing trades. The term cliché was adopted as printers' jargon to refer to a stereotype, electrotype, cast plate or block print that could reproduce type or images repeatedly. It has been suggested that the word originated from the clicking sound in "dabbed" printing (a particular form of stereotyping in which the block was impressed into a bath of molten type-metal to form a matrix). Through this onomatopoeia, cliché came to mean a ready-made, oft-repeated phrase.

=== Usage ===
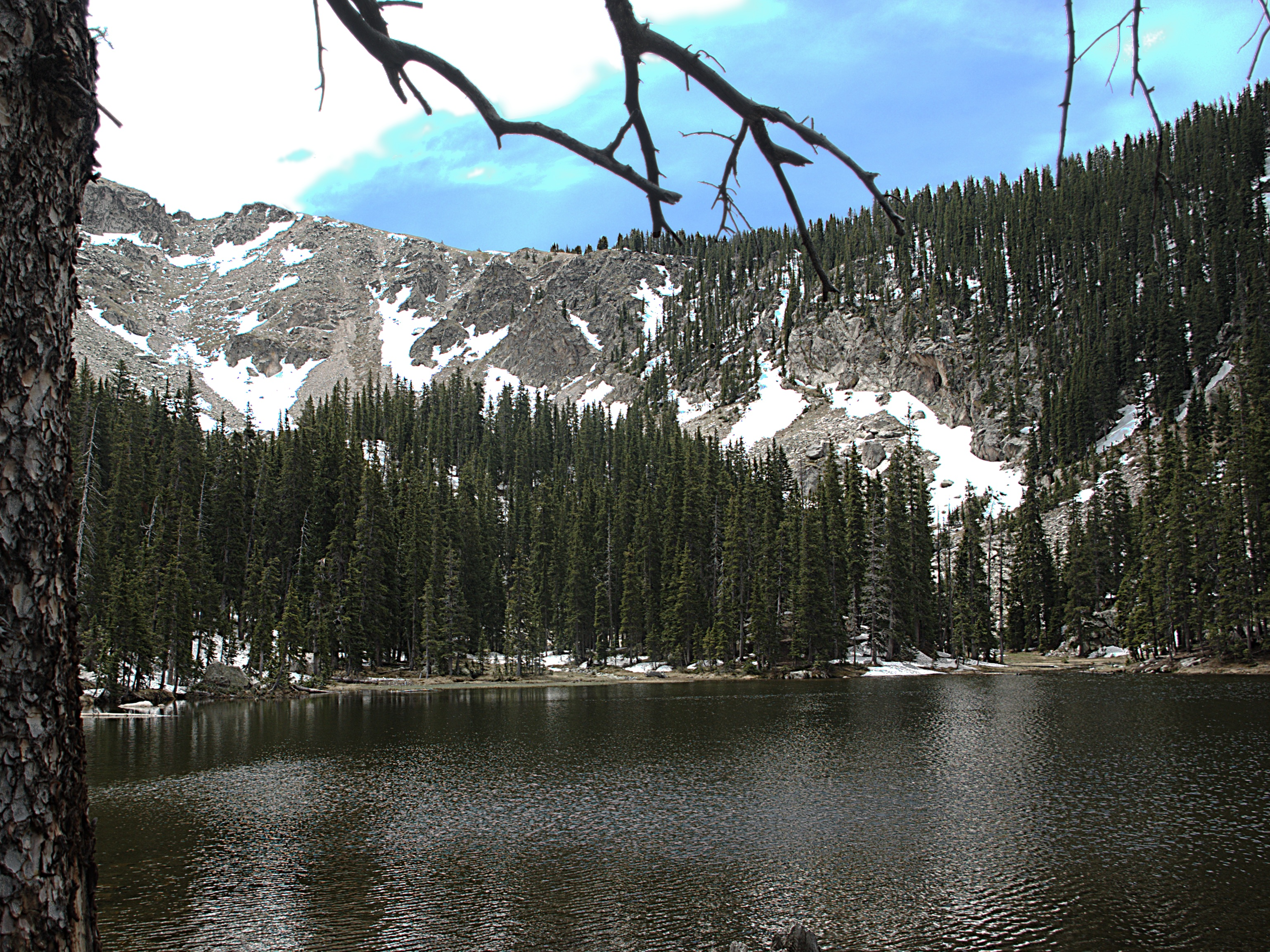
Using a feature such as an overhanging branch to frame a nature scene may be described as a visual cliché.

Various dictionaries recognize a derived adjective clichéd, with the same meaning. Cliché is sometimes used as an adjective, although some dictionaries do not recognize it as such, listing the word only as a noun and clichéd as the adjective.

== Thought-terminating cliché ==
Thought-terminating clichés, also known as thought-stoppers, or semantic stopsigns, are words or phrases that discourage critical thought and meaningful discussion about a given topic. They are typically short, generic truisms that offer seemingly simple answers to complex questions or that distract attention away from other lines of thought. They are often sayings that have been embedded in a culture's folk wisdom and are tempting to say because they sound true or good or like the right thing to say. Some examples are: "Stop thinking so much", "here we go again", and "so what, what effect do my [individual] actions have?"

The term was popularized by psychiatrist Robert Jay Lifton in his 1961 book, Thought Reform and the Psychology of Totalism: A Study of "Brainwashing" in China. Lifton wrote, "The language of the totalist environment is characterized by the thought-terminating cliché. The most far-reaching and complex of human problems are compressed into brief, highly reductive, definitive-sounding phrases, easily memorized and easily expressed. These become the start and finish of any ideological analysis". Sometimes they are used in a deliberate attempt to shut down debate, manipulate others to think a certain way, or dismiss dissent. However, some people repeat them, even to themselves, out of habit or conditioning, or as a defense mechanism to reaffirm a confirmation bias.

== See also ==
- Archetype
- Aphorism
- Bromide (language)
- Catchphrase
- Dictum
- Figure of speech
- Idiom
- I'm entitled to my opinion
- Irreversible binomial
- Kitsch
- List of English idioms on Wiktionary
- Meme
- Platitude
- Pun
- Shitposting
- Sine dicendo
- Slogan
- Snowclone
- Speech
- Stock character
- Thoughts and prayers
- Category:Tropes
