= Château de Beauregard, Loire Valley =

Renaissance château in the Loire Valley in France

Coordinates: 47°32′13″N 1°23′01″E

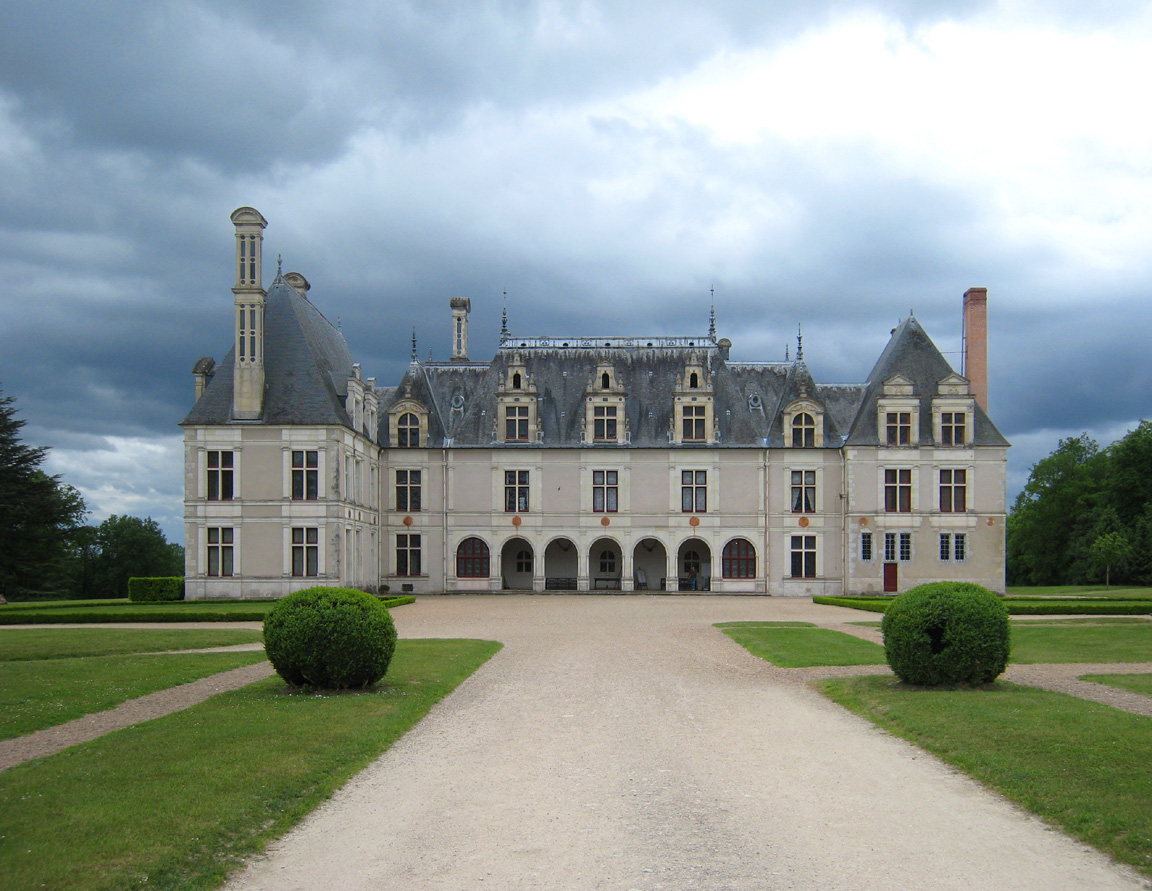
Château de Beauregard, viewed from the front.

The Château de Beauregard is a Renaissance château in the Loire Valley in France. It is located on the territory of the commune of Cellettes, a little south of the city of Blois and a few miles from other famous Loire châteaux such as Cheverny. Although still inhabited, it can be visited by tourists. The château is renowned for its gallery of portraits decorated in the 17th century with 327 portraits of famous people.

== History ==
Most of the château was built around 1545, when it was bought by Jean du Thiers, Lord of Menars, and Secretary of State to Henri II. The commissioned interior included frescoes on the fireplace of the royal chamber, which have survived. In the Great Gallery there is a fireplace in Italian style from this period. However its main feature was commissioned by Paul Ardier, Comptroller of Wars and Treasurer, who bought the château in 1617. He added further interior decorations over the next few decades, including a gallery of portraits.

The château is built on the edge of the Russy Forest.

The ruins of a chapel, prior to the fifteenth century, are still visible in the park. It shows, in stone, shell of the pilgrims of Saint Jacques de Compostela and the motto of the crusaders "God wills it."

The original manor house was built in the late fifteenth century by the family Doulcet. Jean Doulcet, Master of the House of Coins of Charles, Duke of Orléans. In 1495, Charles' son Louis of Orleans (future Louis XII), erected in the land of Beauregard lordship, was authorized by Edict build a dovecote.

The son of John Doulcet Francis, Master of the House of Deniers of Louis XII, was dismissed for defrauding the Crown during the Italian campaigns, and Beauregard then confiscated and incorporated into the royal domain.

In 1521, Francis I, who used until the château as a hunting rendezvous, offered it to his uncle René de Savoie, who died at the Battle of Pavia in 1525, and the area fell to his widow.

In 1545, at a price of 2000 gold crowns, the estate was purchased by John Thier, Secretary of State for Finance for Henry II and a great humanist, protector of poets Joachim du Bellay and Pierre de Ronsard.

Jean Thier was the real builder of the château. He incorporated the old house into the new building, built in the Renaissance style, the central gallery that connected the two residential building body. The architect is unknown. From 1553, Jean du Thier appealed to many foreign artists who were working for King Henry II to undertake the interior decoration. The painter Niccolò dell'Abbate decorated with frescoes in the destruction of the north wing of the 19th century.

Joiner King Francisque Scibec Carpi carved woodwork of the study, the Cabinet of Bells. At the foot of the windows of the south wing, Jean du Thier created a typical Renaissance garden, strictly scheduled. He presented collections of rare plants meet the owner of the botanical tastes.

The château was designed and described in the book of Androuet Hoop, The most excellent buildings of France (Second Volume, 1579).

Florimond Robertet took over Beauregard in 1566. On the death of Jean Thier in 1559, Catherine de' Medici appointed Robertet as Secretary of State for Finance. He undertook no developments to Beauregard, then being absorbed by the construction of his castle of Bury.

The heirs of Florimond Robertet gave way to Paul Beauregard Ardier in 1617. The new owner of the château had to withdraw from the service of Louis XIII after 55 years spent with the kings Henry III, Henry IV, and Louis XIII.

Controller General of War, Grand Treasurer of the savings, he was 72 years old when he devoted himself to embellish his new domain. He destroyed the old house to surround the central gallery of modern two symmetrical wings. It also gave the public their current appearance. The major work of Paul Ardier was the setting for the Portrait Gallery which also occupied the next two generations. His son, Paul Ardier, President of the Chamber of Accounts and the husband of his granddaughter, Gaspard de Fieubet, Chancellor of the Queen Mother Anne of Austria, continued his work. The land of Beauregard was built by Viscount Louis XIV.

The domain of Beauregard left the Ardier wealth in 1816 to be sold to the Viscount of Préval.

The Comtesse de Sainte Aldegonde, born Adelaide Josephine Bourlon Chavagne, widow of the Duke of Castiglione, succeeded him to the château.

On 8 October 1839, his daughter, Marie-Josephine Valentine (1820-1891), married to Alexandre-Edmond de Talleyrand-Périgord castle, Duke of Dino and son of the Duke of Talleyrand; she became the mistress of wealthy Russian subject Anatole Demidoff, made Prince of San Donato in 1840 by ducal decree and ephemeral husband of Mathilde-Laetizia Bonaparte, daughter of Jerome prince and cousin of Napoleon III.

In 1837 Virginia St. Aldegonde, Duchess of Mortemart, inherited from Tourzel Henriette, Duchess of Charost Castle Meillant (Cher), she was restored from 1842.

In 1850, Jules, Comte de Cholet (1798-1884), new owner, entrusted the restoration of the château at the Jules Morandière, and in 1864 it was classified a historic monument by Prosper Mérimée and remained in his family for seventy-two years.

In 1912, Louis Thillier launched a major modernization and restoration.

The domain belongs since 1925 to the family of Gosselin from which the Count Guy of Cheyron Pavilion, which today continues the restoration of the château and the gallery of portraits with his wife.

== Description ==
The main building has two floors of the gallery: the ground floor is a covered porch gallery with seven arches and the first floor is a gallery. In the 16th century, the galleries were designed to connect the two residential buildings. On the south of it, at the right angles, there are advanced wings with two floors and a chimney that's tall and narrow decorated with stale inclusions. You would have to imagine the other side of the court, another wing, probably the body of the primitive home of the 15th century, including Jean du Thier during the constructing duration of the château. This wing, visible on the plans of Androuet du Cerceau, was destroyed in the seventeenth century to make way for a more modern building that has disappeared in the 19th century. The rear facade overlooking the park was changed in the 19th century. It was abolished by the court of the tennis court to double the central building. Thus, the residential wings are no longer front and the back cover is decidedly more massive.

== The gallery of portraits ==
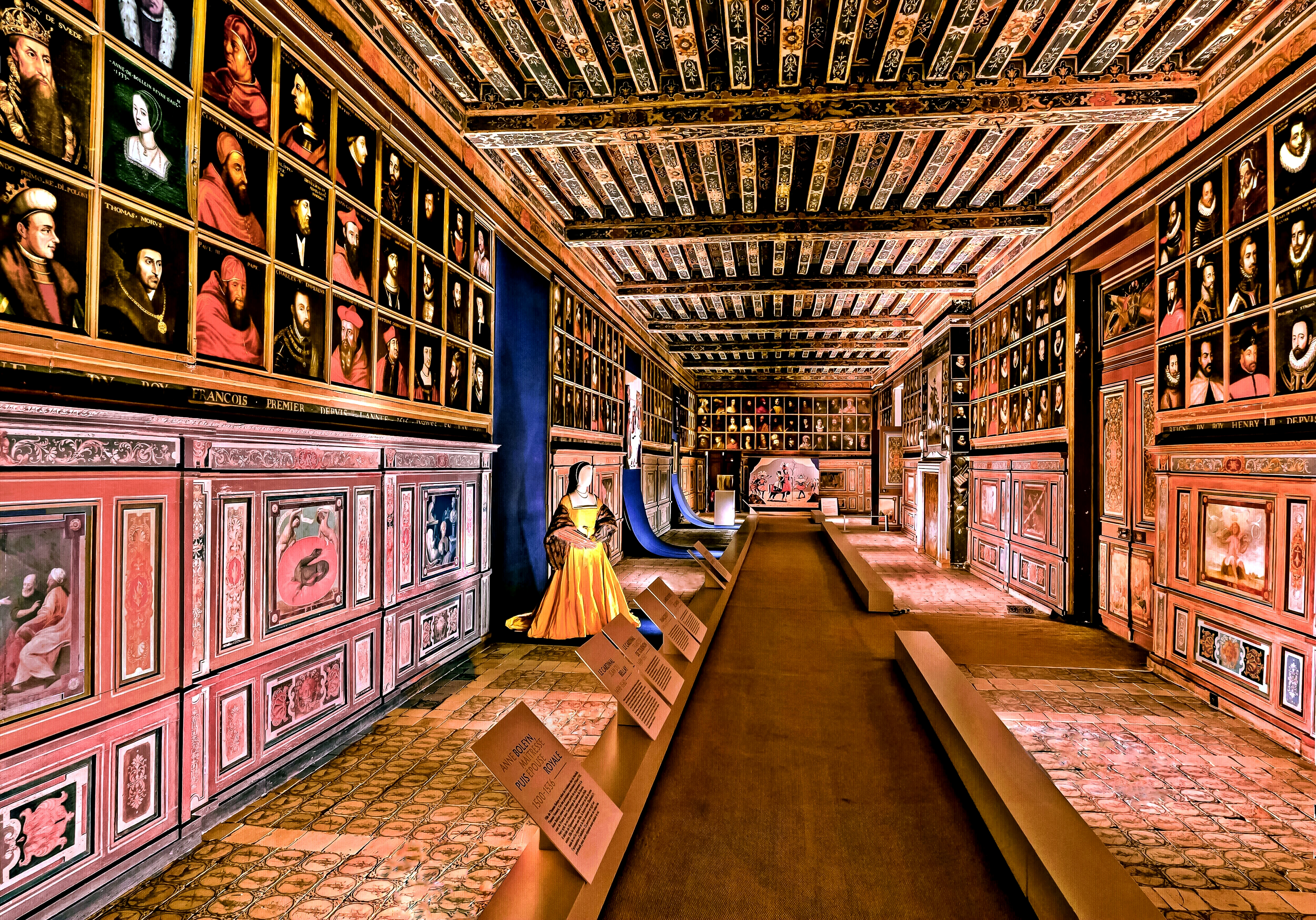
Galeries des Illustres

The gallery of portraits (Galeries des Illustres in French), the largest in Europe to have survived to our days, is the masterpiece of the château : built during the first half of the 17th century at the request of Paul Ardier, it is 26 meters long, its pavement is entirely made of 5 500 Delftware tiles and its walls are decorated with 327 portraits of famous people having lived between 1328 (date of the beginning of the reign of Philippe VI) and 1643 (death of Louis XIII). The French kings are depicted accompanied by portraits of their queens, ministers, marshals, diplomats, etc. Apart from French personalities, other important historical people of 25 nationalities are represented. Marie Ardier, daughter of Paul Ardier, committed the decoration of the ceiling to the painter Jean Mosnier and its family. The blue color which dominates has been obtained by the use of lapis lazuli, one of the most precious and expensive mineral stones in the 17th century. Paul Ardier, owner of Beauregard in 1617, realized in the whole gallery of his château, a historian dream tell through a collection of portraits 315 years of history of France. 3 generations of his family have run for 60 years to design this exceptional piece.

=== Presentation ===
Located on the "noble floor", the gallery is 26 meters long by 6 meters wide. The collection, which is right around the room, includes 327 portraits on 3 levels in 12 panels.

Each portrait painted on the canvas measures on average 55 cm by 45 cm. The characteristics are represented by 2 exceptions and . The large equestrian portrait of Henri IV de France is placed on the fireplace dated in the 16th century.

The portraits of the 14 characters that surround it are significantly smaller than the entire collection.

The ceremonial portrait of covers three levels of portraits.

The number of portraits was variable depending on the king which they are associated. For example, the reign of Philippe IV has six portraits. Charles VIII has 21 portraits and Louis XIII has 40 portraits. The dates of the reigns concerned as well as the emblem and motto of King are painted on wood located between the ground and portraits.

=== Portrait Galleries, an Italian inspiration ===
The first collections of historical portraits appeared in Italy in the 17th century. Through the intellectual current of humanism revived the ancient interest to men who played a dominant role in the course of history. Many people who fascinated by the life and actions and also by the characteristics of the illustrious we tried to reflect closely as possible.

The most famous Italian collection was that of Paul Jove bishop of Nocera gathers in his villa by Lake Como, set consisting of 240 paintings of political and artistic personalities who enjoyed a considerable impact in Europe. A copy of this collection, commissioned by the Medici, is now visible at the Uffizi Gallery in Florence.

In the late sixteenth century, the taste for portrait galleries spread in France. These collections have been dispersed or permanently lost the galleries such as Henry IV ordered the Louvre Richelieu in his Cardinal's palace (Palais Royal) . Both collections gathered political figures and announced the theme which was chosen for the Hall of Beauregard Illustrious.

Beauregard Gallery is by no means an isolated initiative, it must be understood within a mode.

However, since the seventeenth century, this collection was distinguished by his contemporaries: we find an admiring mention in the memoirs of the Grande Mademoiselle when he came to the château in 1655. The excess of the project and the care taken in the realization of the book rendered the famous gallery since its creation, which remains today the largest collection of historical portraits of characters known in Europe .

Visiting the Chateau de Richelieu (1630-1642) in early September 1663, Jean de La Fontaine noticed there a place he said

"Lined with portraits For most about major / Like toilet mirrors; / If we had had more time / Less haste, another interpreter, I would tell you what people . You can judge that it is not ye of little stuff : Richelieu Cardinal, Duke ( his nephew Armand -Jean Vignerot ) who inherited his name; Admiral fire Breze (...) . The rest is full of kings and queens, lords, the great figures of France, then that is the history of the nation that cabinet. One guard had to forget all the people who have triumphed over kings; it is the Mona Lisas, beautiful Agnes and those illustrious conquerors without Henri fourth that would have been invincible prince."

- Jean de La Fontaine

Another collection of portraits are visible in France, but its theme and scale are very different; this is that which was gathered in the seventeenth century, the castle of Bussy- Rabutin in Burgund.

Ernest de Ganay tells the Neuville castle in Gambais in 1939 a "curious royal portrait gallery", some attributed to students Clouet; consists of 192 leading figures in the history of France from François I to the 1789 Revolution, it would have been created in the eighteenth century by Francis Nyert.

In the nineteenth century, in his château of Azay-le-Rideau the Marquis of Biencourt contitua from 1830 a collection of 300 ancient effigies, which was promptly shown to the public; a notable part, acquired in a public auction of the furniture of the house (1898) by one of their descendants, Montaigne Viscountess de Poncins, was bequeathed by her in 1939 at Musée Condé Chantilly, where it is stored.

=== The portrait achievements ===
Between 1620 and 1638, Paul Ardier passed the command of the 327 portraits from a Paris art school. Some portraits of leaving groups have a unity of style to think they are the work of one artist. But no table signature or trademark holders to identify the painter or the painting school in charge of the order. Following the tradition of portrait collections of Italian Renaissance, the picture is designed as a genuine historical document. The search of the safest iconographic sources was a key aspect of the work of Paul Ardier and its painters.

The paintings are mostly copies made in other French and European galleries. Copyists Ardier Paul worked in various existing collections, for instance, that the Chateau de Selles-sur-Cher, near Beauregard where Philippe de Bethune had gathered a collection of historical portraits.

It was in the Richelieu Gallery at Palais Cardinal in 1635, the painting of Louis XIII was copied from the painting of Philippe de Champaigne. We recognize famous works such as Charles VII by Jean Fouquet, Marie de' Medici by Van Dyck or the Count of Olivares by Velasquez.

Regarding the characters of the oldest kingdoms, when pictorial representations did not exist, paint school students worked after medals, drawings but also by observing, in churches, funeral effigies and stained glass. This concern for fidelity to the physical resemblance was completed by careful identification of the characters. In the upper part of each portrait is the name and function of the illustrious.

=== Choice of chronology and characters ===
Paul Ardier formed his collection following a rigorous logic. As a statesman, he Axa his work on political history. Beauregard 's Famous are the characters who, by their actions, have influenced the political history of the kingdom of France.

The temporal boundaries were strictly fixed: the timeline begins at the throne of Philip VI of France in 1328 and ends with the death of Louis XIII in 1643.

Geographically, the project was not limited to domestic politics, France is systematically replaced in its European policy .

The choice of characters depicted was the fruit of a long reflection for Paul Ardier. This was to illustrate the political life of the most comprehensive and representative as possible way. European dimension he gave to his gallery did not facilitate its task.

=== French and European Politics ===
Philip VI of France begins this history of France in 1328 when he ascended the throne following the so-called "cursed" Kings, marking the advent of the Valois dynasty and the beginning of the Hundred Years' War. Fourteen kings of France succeeded him, surrounded by influential politicians of their reign. Louis XIII completes the collection. He was the last king knew that Paul Ardier.

In this unique course, we recognize the great counselors and ministers of the kings of France. In the panel dedicated to Louis XIII, Cardinal Mazarin succeeded Richelieu. The major warlords, as the constable and Joan of Arc, appear surrounded by their comrades.

According to the alliances and wars throughout the European story unfolds. Kings and queens, emperors, popes, generals and ministers of Europe punctuate the gallery. 26 countries are well represented at the turn of the 327 portraits. Edward III of England is the first of seven rulers of England present. For feats, their generals, as the Black Prince and Talbot, take place in the gallery. In the Hundred Years' War succeeded the Italian countryside. It is then the kings and dukes of Naples, Milan and Florence that appear near Charles VIII, Louis XII and Francis. Europe's sovereign draw three centuries of French diplomatic history: Spain, Austria, Hungary, Sweden ... Until the Turkish sultans of Murad I in Suleymaniye, testify to the Ottoman power.

Twenty-one women are present in the collection. Queens of England or Spain, countries where women could exercise the power only six queens of France. Very few of them could get out of their role as mothers to exercise real political power. They appear in the gallery in their role as regent queens, only official political function accessible to women in France. Isabeau of Bavaria we can cross that ruled during the madness of Charles VI, Catherine de' Medici, Marie de' Medici and Anne of Austria. Mary appears to her young husband Francis II. It is identified as "Queen of France and Scotland."

=== Room decor ===
The portrait collection is embedded in a true decorative casket; the decor of the room was to the extent of the collection.

=== Delftware ===
Paul Ardier the Younger, oversaw the laying of some 5,500 Delft tiles adorning the floor of the gallery. Ordered from the famous Dutch earthenware from Delft, the 150 square meters of tiles represent an entire army in working order. There are 17 body regiments in costume inspired Louis XIII engraving Jacques De Gheyn. This delft earthenware pavement is the largest in the world.

=== The painted decoration ===
For the realization of the painted decoration, Ardier Marie and her husband Gaspard Fieubet, grandchildren Paul Ardier, spoke to Mosnier family, which you can admire the works at the Luxembourg Palace and the château of Cheverny. Peter, son of Jean Monier represented the currencies and the emblems of the kings of France on the woodwork beneath portraits. The dominant color of the ceiling to the French, the blue was obtained with powdered lapis lazuli, one of the gems of the old regime . We then estimated the price to seven times that of gold.

=== Collection through the centuries ===
Paul Ardier son continued the work begun in the gallery by decorating a room adjoining tables corresponding to the reign of Louis XIV, but this collection, there is nothing left; only the entablature of the ceiling still bears the name and dates of the Sun King.

The vigilance of the various owners of the château and the celebrity of the gallery prevented the dispersion and alteration of the main collection.

In 1834, Louis -Philippe I at Versailles created a historical museum " dedicated to all the glories of France." On his orders, 89 paintings were copied to the Beauregard gallery to enrich the museum's collections to the glories of France.

The restoration of all the paintings began in 1986 and continues to this day.

=== The cabinet of bells ===
This small room, fully sheeted oak woodwork, is in the tradition of Italian Studiolo. Originally, the workroom was connected to the Gallery through a small door sacrificed in the seventeenth century at the time of the establishment of the portrait collection.

Jean Thier commanded the paneling of his study to the cabinetmaker Francisque Scibec Carpi. The Italian artist worked for Francis I at Fontainebleau, to the Louvre Henri II and Diane de Poitiers the Château d'Anet. The order date of 1554, the price remains unknown. Achieving the woodwork necessitated six months of work only.

The coffered ceiling, pegged, is considered one of the finest in France. It consists of a large octagon surrounded by eight small hexagons finely carved. In its center, the ceiling carries the coat of arms of Jean Thier: "Azure three bells placed two on one" (three gold bells on a blue background).

Jean Thier commanded indeed a very personal decor. The elements of its image are the major decorative features of the room. The friezes of bells that adorn the walls gave his nickname to the firm.

In the upper part of the woodwork are embedded paintings by local artists from cartons Niccolò dell'Abbate. Jean Thier surrounded himself in his study, his favorite activities: arts (painting, sculpture, literature, music and silverware) and more physical disciplines (art of war, hunting and tennis court).

In the seventeenth century, Paul Ardier had busted the original fireplace. The coats of arms of his family adorn the amounts.

A painting of Louis XIII on horseback adorned the fireplace until the early twentieth century. To overcome her disappearance in 1925, the family Gosselin commanded at the Louvre, a copy of the huntress Diana Francois Clouet.

=== The park ===
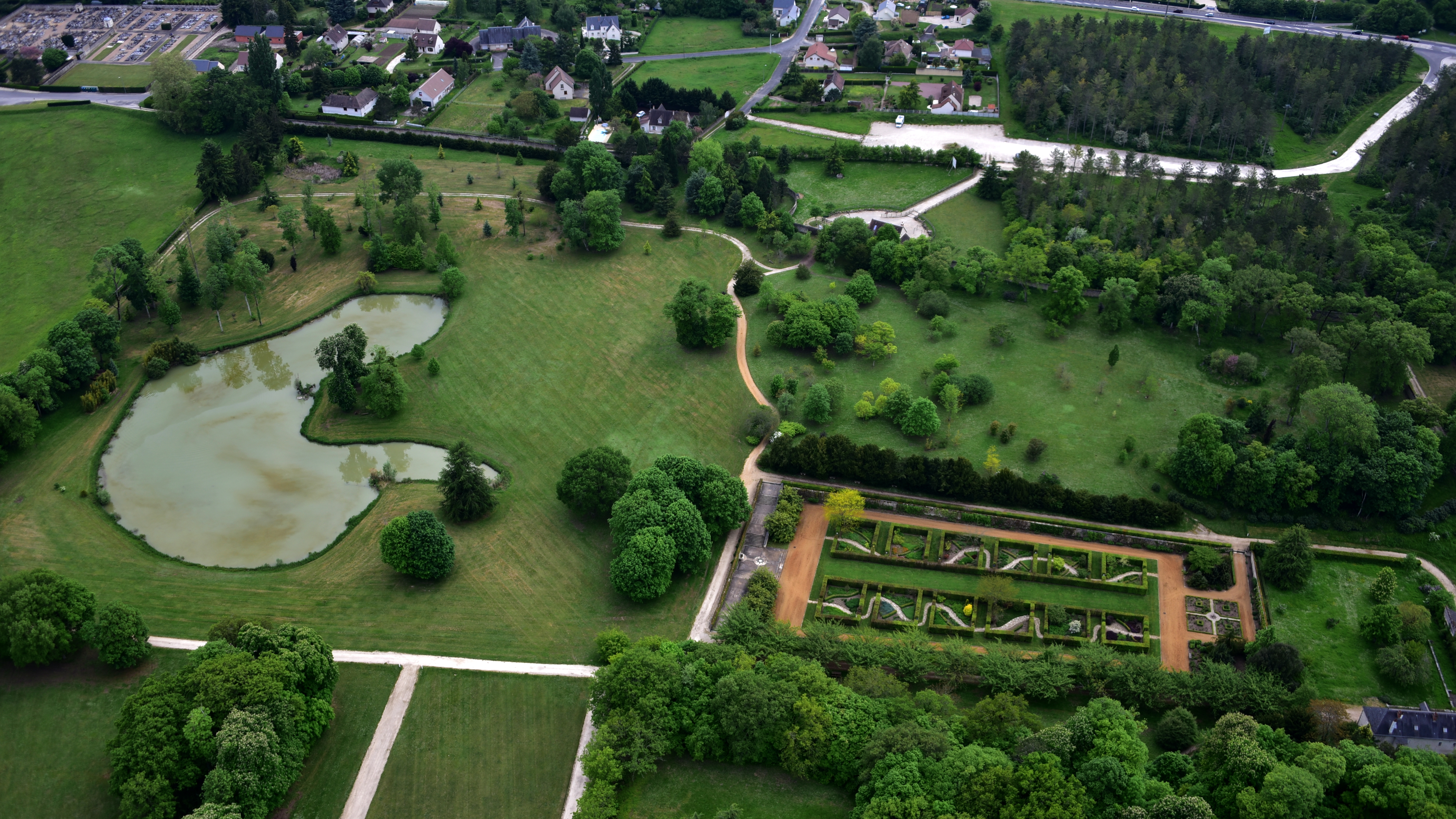
The park

The walled château park has 70 hectares; 40 hectares are the flower garden, the rest of the property is occupied by wood.

=== The Renaissance ===
Castle Jean Thier was a pleasure castle, remains a country facing its gardens. In 1551 Henry II gave to his minister and friend 1500 trees (oak, elm, beech, holly and hazel) to take in the royal forests.

Jean Thier was known to his contemporaries as a lover and collector of rare plants. Beauregard garden was greeted in the sixteenth century, Androuet Hoop get echoed. In his book, The most excellent buildings in France, he spent three prints the castle and its grounds. The largest pavilion of the house looked a learned audience. It was a geometrically ordered garden, with many species of rare plants. He had the characteristics of the Renaissance garden: wooden galleries ending with small temples, a fountain in the center, using the box to delimit the parterres.

Beauregard garden had a utilitarian purpose. From Jean Thier and plans of the seventeenth and eighteenth centuries, we note the presence of a significant amount of fruit trees (cherry, plum, almond, walnut). The acres of vineyards were located along the south side. The vegetable garden was deep in the park, at the site of the current Jardin des Portraits. Everything remained embellished with architectural elements and alleys to combine business with pleasure.

=== The modern era ===
In 1617, the château came into the heritage of the Ardier family. Paul Ardier The interest focused on interior design.

He did not neglect the park either. Two years after his arrival in 1619, he closed the park walls. Buying new land, it radically changed the perspective of the château. On the plans of Androuet Hoop, we see that the château entrance was on the west side of the château. Paul Ardier ordered the construction of a new driveway centered on the gallery. Along this line, the current path of honor, were planted fruit trees.

The walled garden of Jean Thier was preserved, he adapted to the new gardens in the French fashion.

In 1661, the documents attest to the existence of a building reserved for orange and in 1718, was raised in a large body of which he remains today only half. An inventory of the early eighteenth century counted 74 orange and lemon reflecting the real interest of Beauregard lords for their orangery.

=== The 19th century ===
Fashion landscaped gardens arrived in France in the late eighteenth century. In England, landowners were enthusiastic about all landscaping that preserved the natural appearance of sites. In France, one of the most successful examples of these gardens are landscaped gardens of the Petit Trianon at Versailles created for Queen Marie Antoinette . The eighteenth century also saw the appearance in France previously unknown species brought back from scientific expeditions in North America and the Middle East .

Some of these rare species will enrich the Beauregard gardens like a cedar of Lebanon, the tulip tree magnolia grandiflora or.

The author of the park to Beauregard Castle English is unfortunately not known. In the eighteenth century or the Empire, the English tradition supplanted the garden "to the French."

=== The rehabilitation in the 20th century ===
In 1992, the park was listed as a historical monument. A major restoration work was then undertaken. Inspired by a Gilles Clément project, the Beauregard gardens evidence a concern to ensure the link between the past centuries and modern times. The various collections of trees and plants (oak, cedar, bamboo, decorative barks) are the direct descendants of the botanical likes of Jean Thier. Portraits of the garden or the recent renovation of the cooler demonstrate continuous innovation.

Portraits of the garden was created in 1992 by Gilles Clément. Portraits of the garden consists of 12 portraits gardens recalling the 12 groups in the château gallery. Protected by its high walls plant, garden or each "room" is a variation on a dominant color and a scholarly exercise of landscape gardening. More than 400 species of perennials and shrubs seem to evolve without any constraints. The color of the rooms can be symbolically associated with a character or an event recounted in the great gallery of the château. For example, a red room is associated with blood of St. Bartholomew's Day Massacre.

The château's ice room was renovated during the winter 2007/2008. Dating from the seventeenth century, it shows an unknown technical heritage of the general public. These vessels were designed for ice storage and conservation throughout the year.

The park has been designated as a "Remarkable Garden".

=== Expositions ===
Since 2010, this takes place every year, the Portrait of the International Exhibition, the third edition guest of honor Jean -Pierre Alaux.

== See also ==
- Liste des châteaux de la région Centre
- Paul II Ardier

== Notes and references ==
- Coordonnées vérifiées sur Géoportail et Google Maps
- « Notice no PA00098404 » [archive], base Mérimée, ministère français de la Culture
- Lettres à Mme de La Fontaine, dans Oeuvres complètes de La Fontaine, tome VI, Paris, P. Durand, 1826, pp. 243 à 245.
- Céramiques de Delft, Hans van Lemmen, Anthèse, Paris, 1997
- Comité des Parc et Jardins de France [archive]

== Sources ==
- Châteaux of the Loire Valley, Polidori & de Montclos (Könemann). ISBN 3-89508-598-7
