= Truism =

Claim so obvious as to be hardly worth mentioning

A truism is a claim that is so obvious or self-evident as to be hardly worth mentioning, except as a reminder or as a rhetorical or literary device, and is the opposite of a falsism.

In philosophy, a sentence which asserts incomplete truth conditions for a proposition may be regarded as a truism. An example of such a sentence would be "Under appropriate conditions, the sun rises." Without contextual support – a statement of what those appropriate conditions are – the sentence is true but incontestable.

Lapalissades, such as "If he were not dead, he would still be alive", are considered to be truisms.

== See also ==
- Aphorism
- Axiom
- Cliché
- Contradiction
- Dictum
- Dogma
- Figure of speech
- Maxim
- Moral
- Platitude
- Synthetic proposition
- Tautology
