= Platitude =

Trite, prosaic, or cliché truism

A platitude is a statement that is seen as trite, meaningless, or prosaic, aimed at quelling social, emotional, or cognitive unease. The statement may be true, but its meaning has been lost due to its excessive use as a thought-terminating cliché.

Platitudes have been criticized as giving a false impression of wisdom, making it easy to accept falsehoods:

A platitude is even worse than a cliché. It’s a sanctimonious cliché, a statement that is not only old and overused but often moralistic and imperious. ... [P]latitudes have an aphoristic quality, they seem like timeless moral lessons. They therefore shape our view of the world, and can lull us into accepting things that are actually false and foolish.

Platitudes often take the form of tautologies, e.g., "it is what it is", making them appear vacuously true. But the phrase is used to mean "there is no way of changing it", which is no longer a tautology: "Structuring the sentiment as a tautology allows it to appear inescapable." At the same time, some phrases that have become platitudes may provide useful moral guidance, such as "do unto others as you would have them do unto you". Others, though widely trivialized, may be thought-provoking, such as "Be the change you wish to see in the world".

== Etymology ==
The word is a borrowing from the French compound platitude, from plat 'flat' + -(i)tude '-ness', thus 'flatness'. The figurative sense is first attested in French in 1694 in the meaning 'the quality of banality' and in 1740 in the meaning 'a commonplace remark'. It is first attested in English in 1762.

== Examples ==
- Thoughts and prayers
- It doesn't matter who scores, as long as the team wins.
- Sacrifice today for a better tomorrow.
- Nobody's perfect.
- Good things come to those who wait.
- Life is a mystery.
- That's just my personal opinion.
- I wish I knew then what I know now.
- Sometimes bad things lead to good things.
- What doesn't kill you makes you stronger.
- We all die someday.
- Everybody changes.
- It really do be like that sometimes.
- Take the good with the bad.
- Everything isn't always what it seems.
- Everything happens for a reason.
- Whatever will be, will be.

== In philosophy ==
In philosophy, platitudes are beliefs or assertions about a topic which are generally accepted as common sense. In some approaches to conceptual analysis, they are taken as a starting point. Roger Scruton observes that platitudes can for some philosophers play a defining role in addressing questions, where "platitudes - innocuous though they may seem to the untheoretical eye - provide the ultimate test of any philosophical theory".

Conjoining the platitudes on a topic may give a Ramsey sentence. Analyzing platitudes forms part of the Canberra Plan of philosophical methodology.

== See also ==
- Bromide (language) – Phrase or cliché that is boring and unoriginal
- Buzzword – Word or phrase used to impress
- Cliché – Overused, unoriginal phrase or opinion
- Thought-terminating cliché – Commonly used phrase used to quell cognitive dissonance
- Demagogue – Politician or orator who panders to fears and emotions of the public
- Snowclone – Cliché used as a pattern for other expressions
- Superficiality – Concept in social psychology
- Tautology (language) – In literary criticism, repeating an idea
- Tautophrase – Repetition of an idea in the same words
- Truism – Claim so obvious as to be hardly worth mentioning
- Slogan – Memorable motto or phrase used in social movements & advertisements

== Bibliography ==
- Jay J. Smith, A Plethora of Platitudes: A collection of cliches and an assortment of adages, Writers Club Press (self-published), 2000. ISBN 1462089666
- James A. Chapman, Handbook of Grammar and Composition. Pensacola, FL: Beka Book Publications, 1985.
