= Captain Obvious =

Captain Obvious is part of an American expression demonstrating a lapalissade. It was coined in the 1990s in the Girl Talk series of novels by L.E. Blair.

It may also refer to:

- Captain Obvious (advertising character), a fictional character in Hotels.com advertisements
- Captain Obvious, a character in Annoying Orange, an American YouTube web series
- Captain Obvious, a character on The Shebang, an Australian radio show
- "Captain Obvious", an episode of Mr Inbetween, an Australian TV show
