= Bromide (language) =

Phrase or cliché that is boring and unoriginal

Bromide in literary usage means a phrase, cliché, or platitude that is trite or unoriginal. It can be intended to soothe or placate; it can suggest insincerity or a lack of originality in the speaker. Bromide can also mean a commonplace or tiresome person, a bore (a person who speaks in bromides).

== Etymology ==
Various bromine salts or bromides were discovered during the second half of the 19th century to have calming effects on the central nervous system. By the end of the century, they were widely used both for specific indications like epilepsy, convulsions, and insomnia, and even for "general nervousness". Sodium bromide was used in remedies such as Bromo-Seltzer that were popular for headaches and hangovers, in part due to the sedative effects.

In April 1906, the American humorist Gelett Burgess published an essay in The Smart Set called "The Sulphitic Theory". In this essay, he used "bromide" to characterize a sedate, dull person who said boring things. In the fall of 1906, he published a revised and enlarged essay in the form of a small book. The book's full title was Are You a Bromide? Or, The Sulphitic Theory Expounded and Exemplified According to the Most Recent Researches Into the Psychology of Boredom: Including Many Well-known Bromidioms Now in Use. In these works he labeled a dull person as a "Bromide" contrasted with a "Sulphite" who was the opposite. Bromides meant either the boring person themself or the boring statement of that person, with Burgess providing many examples.

This usage peaked in the 1950s and dwindled by the end of the 20th century. Some well known quotes (or bromides) in current usage that appeared in Burgess' Are You a Bromide? include:

- "I don't know much about Art, but I know what I like."
- "... she doesn't look a day over fifty."
- "You'll feel differently about these things when you're married."
- "It isn't so much the heat... as the humidity...."
- "You're a sight for sore eyes."

== See also ==
- Cliché
- Trope (literature)
- Idiom
