= The Obvious =

American rock band

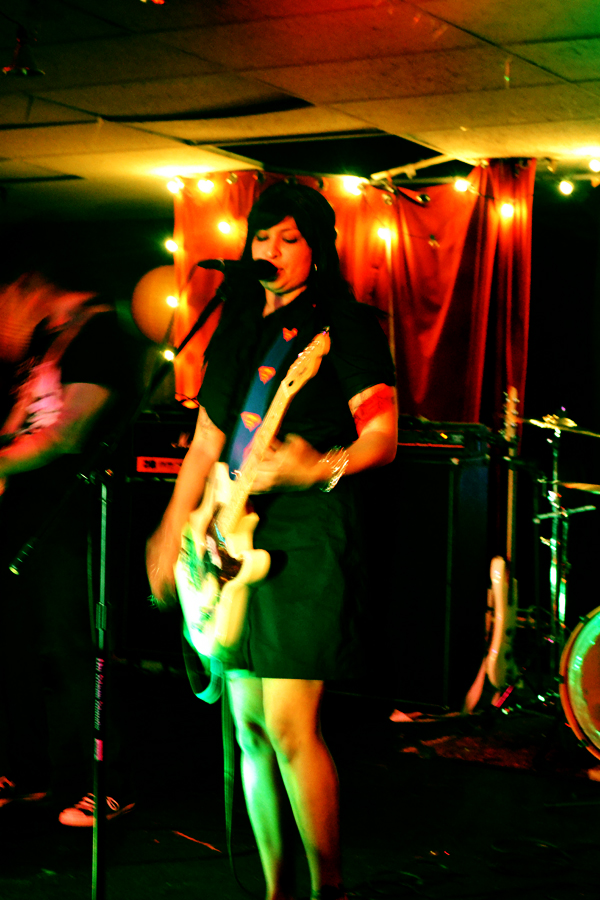
- Frontwoman Surojanie "Angie" Sugrim performs at the Asbury Lanes. February 10, 2012.

Background information
- Origin: Asbury Park, New Jersey, U.S.
- Genres: Alternative rock, grunge, punk rock
- Years active: 2005–present
- Members: Surojanie Sugrim; Daniel Astorri; Biff Swenson

The Obvious is an American independent alternative/punk rock band that was formed in Asbury Park, New Jersey, United States, in mid-2005. The band currently consists of frontwoman Surojanie "Angie" Sugrim (guitar, lead vocals), Dan Astorri (lead guitar, vocals), and Biff Swenson (bass). (As of January 2016 they are courting a particular drummer and hope to make an official announcement soon.) The band has shared a similar style to other punk/alt-rock bands such as early Nirvana, Hole, and the Afghan Whigs. The Obvious has developed itself to be one of the most prominent punk rock acts to come out of the mid-2000s revival of the Asbury Park music scene.

== History ==
=== Formation ===
The Obvious originally began as a duo founded by Angie Sugrim and Dan Astorri. The two friends had grown up in the suburbs of New Jersey and had begun playing music together around the time they were in high school. Similarly influenced by early 1990s alternative rock, Sugrim and Astorri began writing songs together for themselves in the basement of Astorri's childhood home.

The band became a serious project in the years after they finished high school, and in mid-2005, they chose the name "The Obvious" for their musical project. A political science major with a minor in Women's Studies from Rutgers University, Sugrim stated that the name came from a quote from an essay she read in school: "People like us, we fight for the obvious". Astorri is also a Rutgers alum, majoring in English and journalism with a minor in creative writing. The band's songs are known for their sociopolitical lyrics and content.

In 2007, the band began performing live after adding bassist Joy Bellamy and drummer Matt Guzda. Continuing to develop their sound, the Obvious had begun to carve out their own little path among the numerous Asbury Park performers. In 2008, at the 16th annual Asbury Park Music Awards, the Obvious won the award for "Top Indie Rock Band". In 2009, before the band began to record their first EP, Bringing Wreck, both Bellamy and Guzda (who went on to form the acclaimed alt-rockabilly band TV Tramps) were replaced by bassist Mike Smith and drummer Kevin Conroy.

=== Bringing Wreck ===
With the new line-up, the Obvious headed into Little Eden Studios with the Bouncing Souls' Pete Steinkopf producing. Shortly thereafter, on July 23, 2010, the Obvious released their debut EP entitled Bringing Wreck. The EP was called a "precarious downhill delight filled with a savage self-awareness" by critics.

Bringing Wreck

Studio album by The Obvious
- Released: July 23, 2010 (Digital); July 23, 2010 (Physical CD)
- Recorded: April–May 2010 at Little Eden Studio in Asbury Park, NJ
- Genres: Alternative rock, punk rock
- Length: 11:42
- Producer: Pete Steinkopf

All tracks are written by Surojanie Sugrim, Daniel Astorri, Mike Smith, Kevin Conroy.

No.	Title	Length
1.	"Doctor, Doctor"	3:05
2.	"The Truth Fairy"	1:59
3.	"Hell Yeah"	2:37
4.	"Don't Match"	2:17
5.	"K.O.?! O.K.!"	2:31

=== 2011–present ===
In September 2011, it was announced that drummer Kevin Conroy would be leaving the band and moving to the west coast. The Obvious almost immediately recruited a replacement and named musician Rob Blake, as the new drummer.

The band released their second EP, Maybe She's Bored With It, in early 2012 (again with Pete Steinkopf at the controls) and played shows frequently throughout 2012–2013, winning Top Indie Rock band for the second time at the Asbury Music Awards in late 2012, and opening for Courtney Love in June 2013 at the Stone Pony. In December 2013, they parted ways with bassist Mike Smith and drummer Rob Blake (who have since formed and fronted the ultra hard-rock/punk/metal band Ether Sunday, which focuses on "the heavier side of 90s alternative rock").

Around this time the band signed with Altercation Records and released their first LP, entitled Duress. The album is available on CD, iTunes, and Spotify. The material was selectively culled from their two previous self-released EPs and remastered (with the exception of "Talking", a new song which was produced and mixed by Rob Blake at his studio Insidious Sound in mid-2013). In addition to local/NYC shows, they played several dates at South by Southwest in March 2014 (as well as opening for The Buzzcocks at the Stone Pony in March 2015, and doing a small tour of New England in October 2015) in support of the album. They also filmed three videos: two for the songs "Don't Match" and "Mercy Burns", as well as a live clip for "Doctor, Doctor".

The Obvious will be releasing a second LP (which currently has the working title Playing With Fire Extinguishers) in Spring 2016 on Altercation Records, followed by another appearance at this year's South by Southwest festival.

== Discography ==
=== EPs ===
- Bringing Wreck (2010)
- Maybe She's Bored With It (2012)

=== Albums ===
- Duress (2014 Altercation Records)
- Playing With Fire Extinguishers (Altercation Records)
