= Bernard de la Monnoye =

French lawyer, poet, philologue and critic

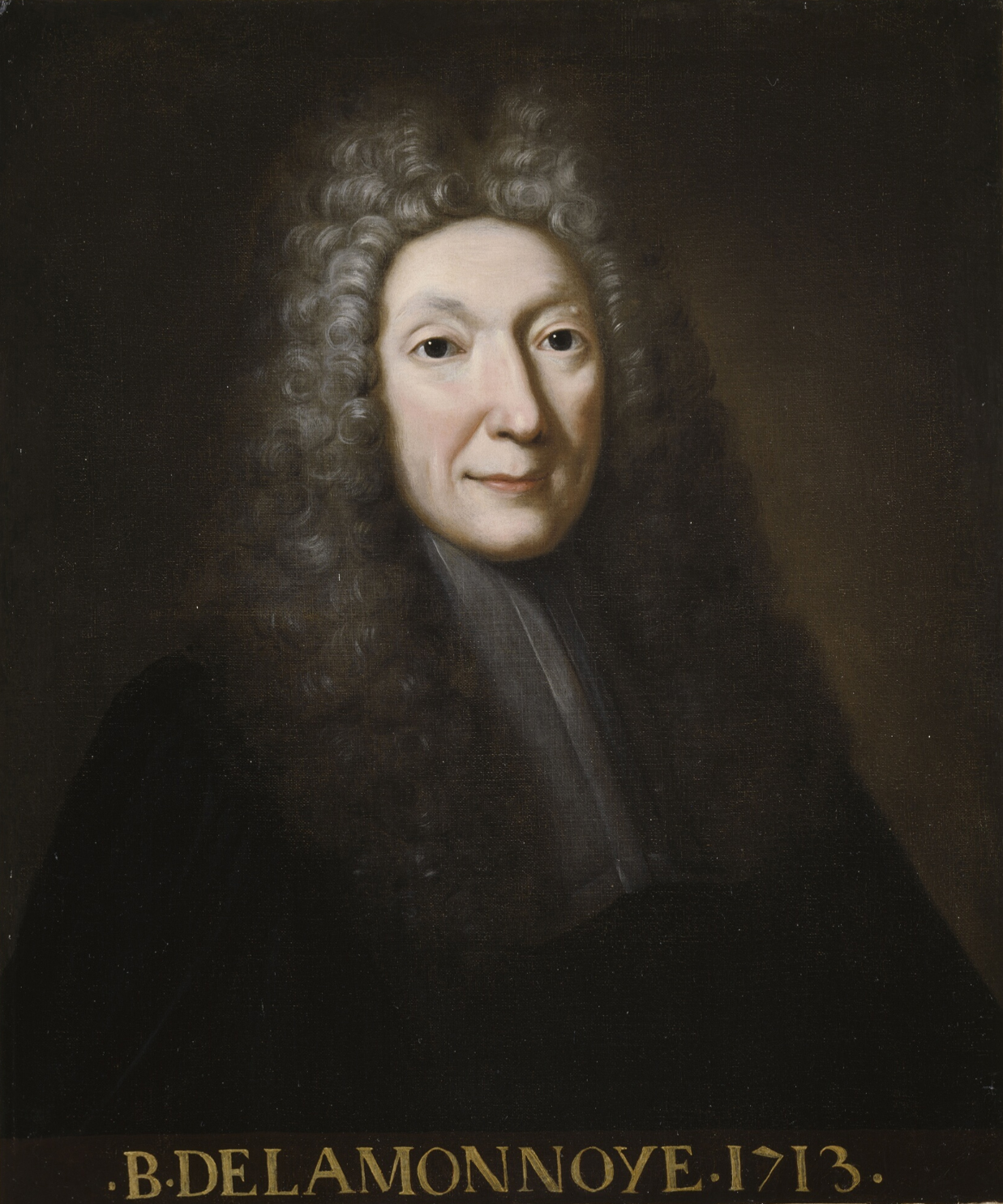
Bernard de La Monnoye

Bernard de La Monnoye (15 June 1641, in Dijon, Province of Burgundy – 15 October 1728) was a French lawyer, poet, philologue and critic, known chiefly for his carol Noei borguignon (Borguignon Christmas).

== Biography ==
La Monnoye began his studies in Jesuit schools, and attracted attention for his epigrams in Latin and essays in French. By his father's wish, he went to study law at Orléans. There, during the harsh study of jurisprudence, he gave way to his literary tastes by gathering curiosities about the authors and books that he read. He began legal practice at the Parlement de Dijon in 1662; but had little inclination for that profession, and, using his health as an excuse, left the bar and devoted himself entirely to the literary arts.

In the following years La Monnoye divided his time between reading books and frequenting the intellectual circles of Dijon, where he made his debut in poetry. In 1671 he won a contest of the Académie française with a poetic essay on "the abolition of the duel", which was ardently praised by Charles Perrault, and years later by Voltaire. He went on to win the academy's contest four more times. Rumors circulated that the organizers had asked him to refrain from entering the contest again, to give a chance to other authors.

To make a living, he took in 1672 a job at the Court of Finances, which he kept for eight years. Not long afterwards he got married. During this time he produced copious verse, which made him moderately famous. He also composed many hymns in Latin, and translated into French, with a glossary, the Spanish poem Thérèse d'Avila. By 1687 he was admitted as a corresponding member of Padua's Accademia dei Ricovrati.

Among his best compositions of the time are a dozen riddles in sonnet format, some of which are considered to be better than anything of the sort that existed at the time; and three translations of texts about Burgundy wine, Champagne wine, and cider. He also wrote, under the pseudonym Gui Barozai, Noei borguignon (Borguignon Christmas [Thirteen Christmas Carols]) (1700), a collection of carols in the patois of Bourgogne; which were followed later that year by Noei tô nôvea (Sixteen More Christmas Carols). These songs in simple language became immensely popular. The best known, which is still orchestrated and played today, is probably "Guillô, pran ton tamborin", better known as "Patapan", which begins as

Guillô, pran ton tamborin;	Guillaume, prends ton tambourin;	William, take your drum,
Toi, pran tai fleúte, Rôbin !	Toi, prends ta flûte, Robin !	You, take your flute, Robin!
Au son de cé instruman,	Au son de ces instruments	To the sound of these instruments,
Turelurelu, patapatapan,	Turelurelu, patapatapan,	Tu-re-lu-re-lu, pata-pata-pan,
Au son de cé instruman	Au son de ces instruments	To the sound of these instruments
Je diron Noei gaiman.	Je dirai Noël gaîment.	I will say Christmas cheerfully.

Some priests saw in these carols a hidden attempt to mock the Bible, and the question got as far as being submitted to a committee of Sorbonne professors, who prudently avoided the issue. Others disputed La Monnoye's mastery of the Bourgogne dialect, prompting him to write a Glossary of the most difficult terms.

La Monnoye eventually turned his attention to the more scholarly study of writers from classical antiquity. His correspondence with other scholars throughout Europe spread his reputation as a philologist. He made many contributions to Pierre Bayle's Dictionnaire.

La Monnoye moved to Paris in 1707. For several years he declined invitations to join the Académie française, but he was eventually admitted, by unanimous vote, in 1713.

In 1715 he got into trouble for having inserted some texts of his own in the Menagiana, an annotated edition of the works of Gilles Ménage which he was helping to edit. He got off on legal technicalities and thanks to the support of the Cardinal de Rohan.

Having lapsed on his contractual obligations, he had to file for bankruptcy and lost all his modest fortune, being forced to sell even the medals he had won from the academy. At the same time he had to suffer the loss of his beloved wife. He survived thereon on modest but sufficient pensions granted by the Duke of Villeroy and by his publishers, and on the proceeds of the sale of his books. He left four children, three of whom embraced the religious life.

== Publications ==
1. Noël bourguignons de Gui Barozai, ai Dioni (Dijon), (1720), with glossary and music. In Louis Dubois, Noëls et autres poésies bourguignonnes de La Monnoye.
2. Menagiana (1715), 4 vols. La Monnoye appended to volume 4 some texs of his own:
  1. Lettre au président Bouhier sur le prétendu livre des Trois imposteurs.
  2. Dissertation sur le Moyen de parvenir.
  3. Autre Dissertation sur le Songe de Poliphile.
  4. Dissertation sur la célèbre Epigramme latine de Pulci sur un hermaphrodite.
  5. Remarques sur les Judgements des savants de Baillet (with an Abrégé de la vie de M. Baillet).
3. Des Observations sur le Cymbalum mundi et sur les Contes de Bonaventure Desperriers.
4. Remarques sur le Poggiana of Pierre Lenfant, (1722).
5. Préface et des Notes sur les Nuits of Straparole.
6. Deux Préfaces pour la Pancharis of Jean Bonnefons.
7. Notes sur la Bibliothèque choisie et sur les Opuscules de Colomiès.
8. Dissertation sur le Passavant of Théodore de Bèze .
9. Vie du poète Sarrazin, in volume 1 of the Mémoires de Albert-Henri de Sallengre.
10. a Lettre à l'abbé Conti sur les principaux auteurs français, in volume 7 of the Bibliothèque française.
11. Vie de Pyrrhon, translated from the Greek text by Diogenes Laërtius.
12. Some fragments in Mémoires de littérature of Pierre Nicolas Desmolets, volumes 3 and 6.
13. Lettre à Maittaire, contenant diverses remarques sur les Annales de l'imprimerie et sur la vie des Estienne.
14. Remarques sur les Bibliothèques de Lacroix Dumaine et Duverdier (1772).

La Monnoye left as unpublished manuscripts the Observations sur l'Anacréon of Régnier-Desmarais, and the Remarques sur les vies des jurisconsultes, of Taisand; and as unfinished texts La Farce de maître Pierre Pathelin and a Commentaire sur Mellin de Saint-Gelais.

== See also ==
- The Song of la Palice
