= Tautology (language) =

In literary criticism, repeating an idea

In literary criticism and rhetoric, a tautology is a statement that repeats an idea using near-synonymous morphemes, words or phrases, effectively "saying the same thing twice". Tautology and pleonasm are not consistently differentiated in literature. Like pleonasm, tautology is often considered a fault of style when unintentional. Intentional repetition may emphasize a thought or help the listener or reader understand a point. Sometimes, phrases like "Business is business" are conflated with logical tautologies, but are actually idioms making use of semantic differences and connotations to create subcultural shibboleths, while a logical tautology requires its logical constants to be semantically identical.

A phrase or sentence that purports to define a word tautologically by repeating the word, such as "It is what it is", is sometimes called a tautophrase, coined by William Safire in 2006.

== Etymology ==
The word was coined in Koine Greek from ταὐτός ('the same') plus λόγος ('word' or 'idea'), and transmitted through 3rd-century Latin tautologia and French tautologie. It first appeared in English in the 16th century. The use of the term logical tautology was introduced in English by Wittgenstein in 1919, perhaps following Auguste Comte's usage in 1835.

== Examples ==
- "Convicted felon", a common English phrase. Being a felon indicates having been convicted.
- "Only time will tell if we stand the test of time", from the Van Halen song "Why Can't This Be Love"
- "After we change the game it won't remain the same." from the Blackalicious song "Blazing Arrow"
- "That tautological statement has repeated an idea."
- "There once was a fellow from Perth
  Who was born on the day of his birth.
  He got married, they say
  On his wife's wedding day,
  And died when he quitted the earth."
- Torpenhow Hill, which is claimed to mean "Hill-hill-hill Hill"
- "...A forget-me-not, to remind me to remember not to forget." from the Benny Hill song "My Garden of Love"
- "Assless chaps" – chaps by definition are separate leg-coverings; a similar garment joined at the seat would instead be called a pair of trousers.
- "...und wenn sie nicht gestorben sind, dann leben sie noch heute" (and if they have not died, then they are still alive today), traditional German formula to end a fairy tale (like "they lived happily ever after").
- "Former alumni" – alumni means those who are former members of an institution, group, school, etc.
- "If you know, you know", a common English phrase.
- "A pair of two"; by its nature, a pair is two items, so "a pair of two" is redundant.
- "What's for you won't go by you", a Scottish proverb that is tautological
- "Örökrangadó derby", the name of a football match contested between MTK Budapest and Ferencváros in Hungary. The name literally translates as "Derby Derby" in Hungarian.
- "Overexaggerate." An exaggeration is an overstatement, so the over is implied. To "overexaggerate" something means to "over-overstate" it.
- "Illegal trafficking", a common description of human trafficking, which is already a violation of several local and national laws as well as international law.
- "Illegal annexation" – under international law, claiming another country's land as your own is an illegal act (e.g. the common Western phrase "Crimea was illegally annexed by Russia in 2014").
- "People die when they are killed", an infamous out-of-context quote from the 2006 Fate/stay night anime.
- "Hot water heater" is a common tautology that is mistakenly used to refer to a water heater, which would become unnecessary if the water were already hot.
- "Call a spade a spade", frankly calling something what it is

== Initialisms ==
Abbreviations whose last word is often redundantly repeated.

- ATM machine
- CAC card
- COVID-19 disease
- DC Comics
- DVD disc
- EDM music
- HIV virus
- ICBM missile
- ISBN number
- JWT token
- LCD display
- PAT test
- PIN number
- Please RSVP
- RAT test
- SARS syndrome
- SAT test
- SSD drive
- UPC code
- VIN number
- VIP person

== Discussion ==
Intentional repetition of meaning intends to amplify or emphasize a particular, usually significant fact about what is being discussed. For example, a gift is, by definition, free of charge; using the phrase "free gift" might emphasize that there are no hidden conditions or fine print (such as the expectation of money or reciprocation) or that the gift is being given by volition.

This is related to the rhetorical device of hendiadys, where one concept is expressed through the use of two descriptive words or phrases: for example, using "goblets and gold" to mean wealth, or "this day and age" to refer to the present time. Superficially, these expressions may seem tautological, but they are stylistically sound because the repeated meaning is just a way to emphasize the same idea.

The use of tautologies, however, is usually unintentional. For example, the phrases "mental telepathy", "planned conspiracies", and "small dwarfs" imply that there are such things as physical telepathy, spontaneous conspiracies, and giant dwarfs, which are oxymorons.

Parallelism is not tautology, but rather a particular stylistic device. Much Old Testament poetry is based on parallelism: the same thing said twice, but in slightly different ways. (Fowler describes this as pleonasm.) However, modern biblical study emphasizes that there are subtle distinctions and developments between the two lines, such that they are usually not truly the "same thing". Parallelism can be found wherever there is poetry in the Bible: Psalms, the Books of the Prophets, and in other areas as well.

== See also ==
- Bilingual tautological expressions – Redundancy in linguistic expression
- Figure of speech – Purposeful use of language
- Grammar – Structural rules of a language
- Hyperbole – Rhetorical device
- Lapalissade – Obvious and comical truism
- No true Scotsman – Logical fallacy
- Platitude – Trite, prosaic, or cliché truism
